= Grobiņa county =

19th–20th century county in Latvia

Coat of arms of Liepāja county

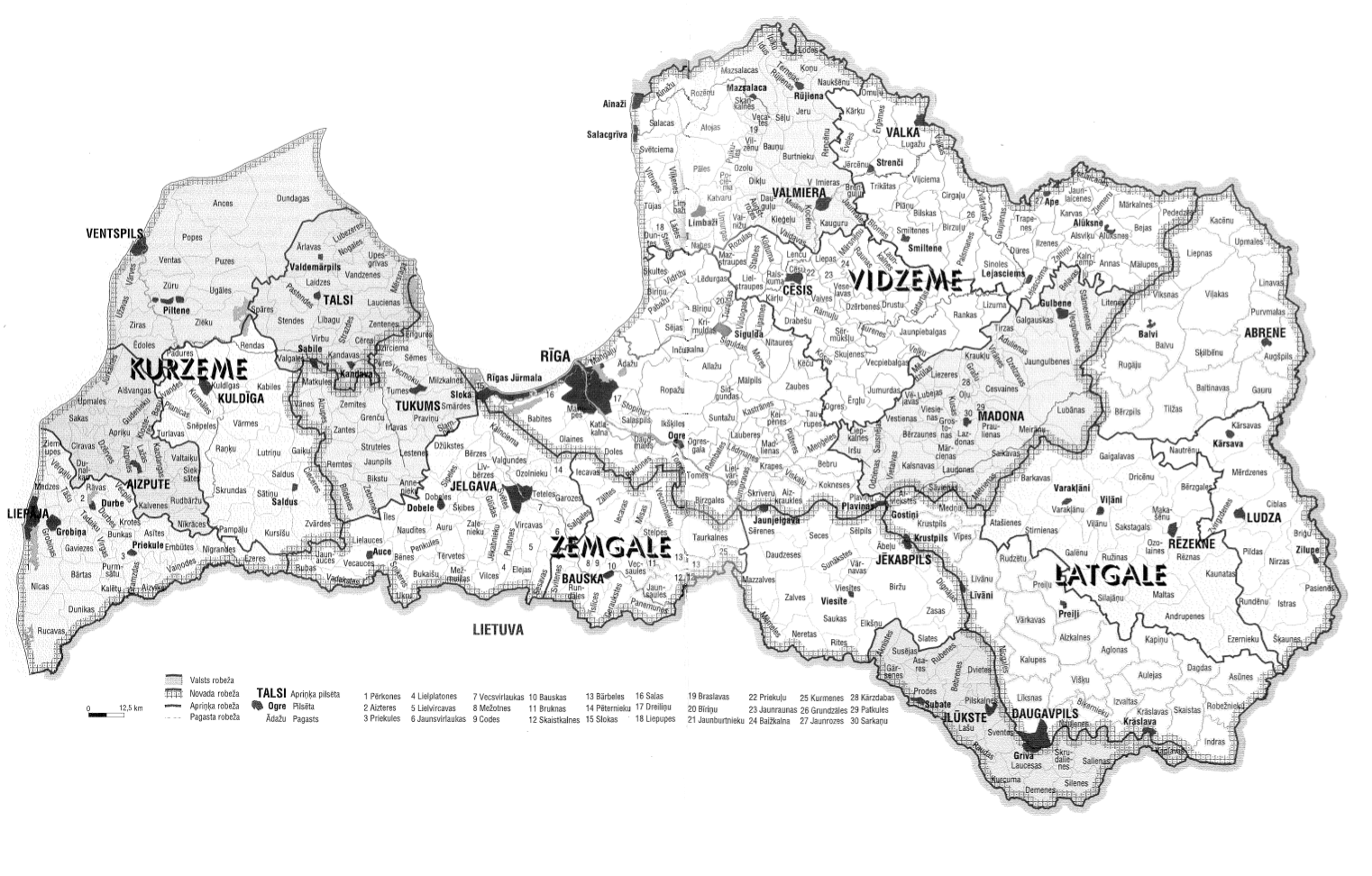
Liepājas apriņķis (former Grobiņas apriņķis) on the map of Latvia (1938)

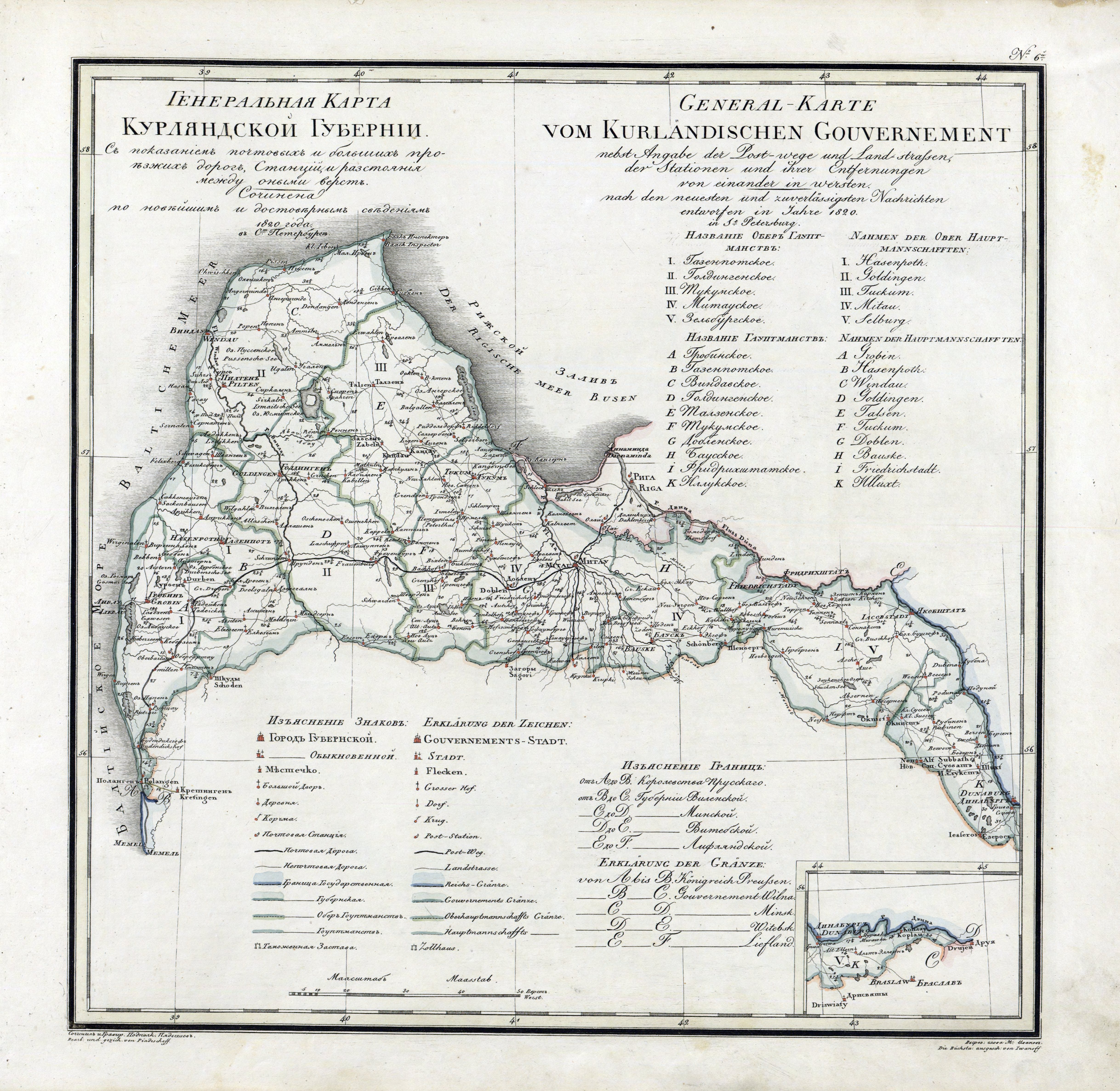
Hasenpoth County on the map of Courland Governorate (1820)

Grobiņa county (Latvian: Grobiņas apriņķis, German: Kreis Grobin, Russian: Гробинский уезд) was a historic county of the Courland Governorate and shortly of the Republic of Latvia. Its capital was Grobiņa (Grobin).

== History ==
Created as the Captaincy of Grobiņa (German: Hauptmannschaft Grobin) of the Duchy of Courland and Semigallia. After incorporation into the Russian Empire it was merged with southwestern parts of District of Pilten in 1819 to become part of the Chief Captaincy of Aizpute (German: Overhauptmannschaft Hasenpoth). In 1864, County of Grobiņa (Kreis Grobin) became one of the ten counties of the Courland Governorate.

After establishment of the Republic of Latvia, the Grobiņas apriņķis was renamed to Liepājas apriņķis in 1920. On 27 March 1921 the Parish of Palanga was transferred to Lithuania.

In 1949, the Council of Ministers of the Latvian SSR had split Liepājas apriņķis into the newly created districts (rajons) of Liepāja, Priekule (dissolved 1959) and Aizpute (dissolved 1962).

== Demographics ==
At the time of the Russian Empire Census of 1897, Kreis Grobin had a population of 110,878. Of these, 58.5% spoke Latvian, 15.3% German, 6.9% Russian, 6.5% Yiddish, 5.8% Polish, 5.5% Lithuanian, 0.3% Belarusian, 0.2% Danish or Norwegian and 0.2% Ukrainian as their native language.

== Subdivisions (1912) ==
Latvian	German	Russian
Bārtas	Oberbartau	Обербартауская
Durbes	Durben	Дурбенская
Gaviezes	Gawesen	Гавезенская
Grobiņas	Grobin	Гробинская
Medzes-Vērgales	Medsen-Virginahlen	Медзен-Вирцниленская
Nīcas	Niederbartau	Нидербартауская
Palangas	Polangen	Полангенская
Pērkones	Perkuhnen	Перкуненская
Priekules	Preekuln	Прекульнская
Rucavas	Rutzau	Рутцауская
Tadaiķu	Tadaiken	Тадайкенская
Talsu	Talsen	Тальсенская
Vecpils	Altenburg	Альтенбургская

=== Palanga as a part of Grobin County ===
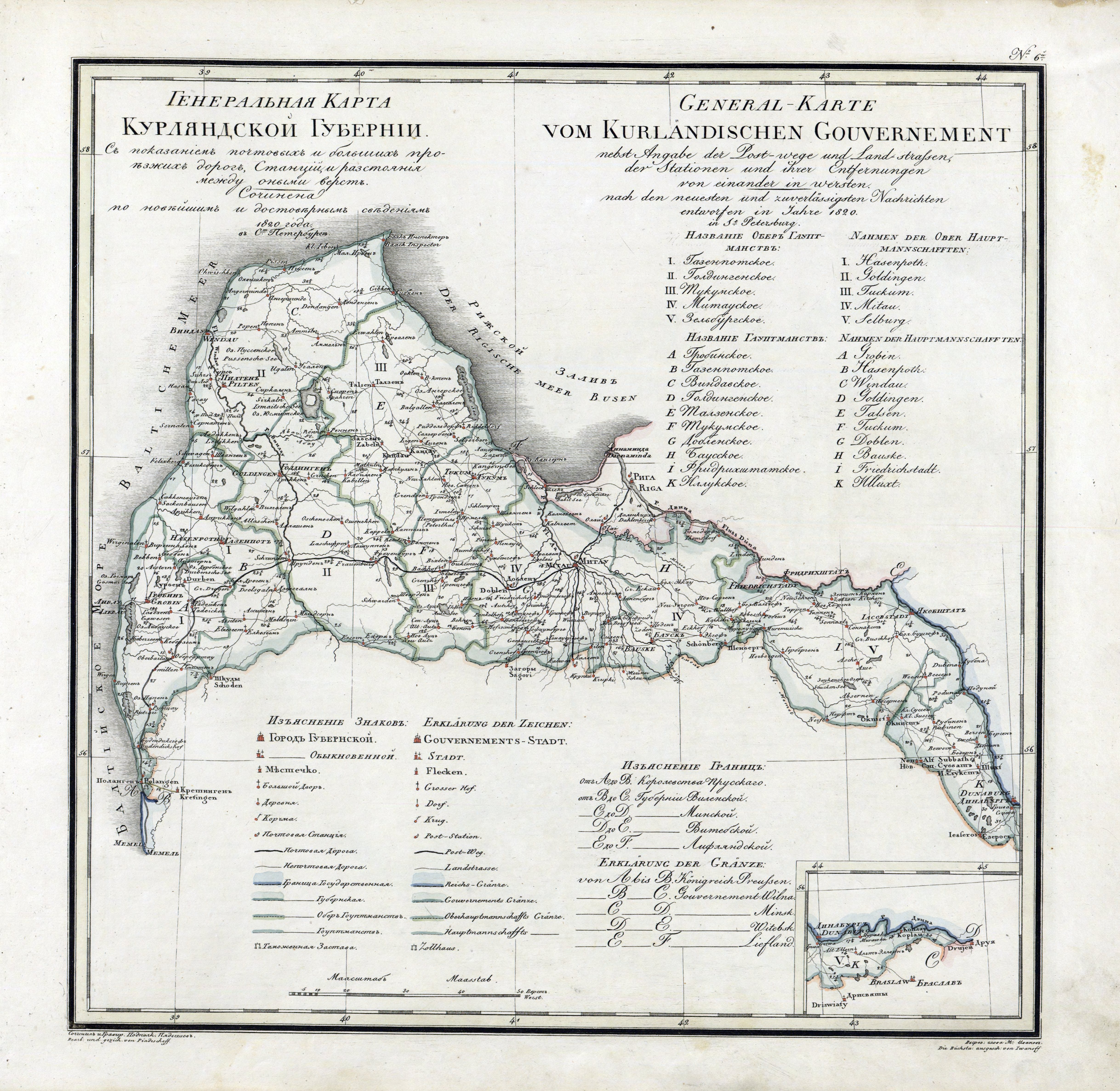
1820 Polangen in Kurland

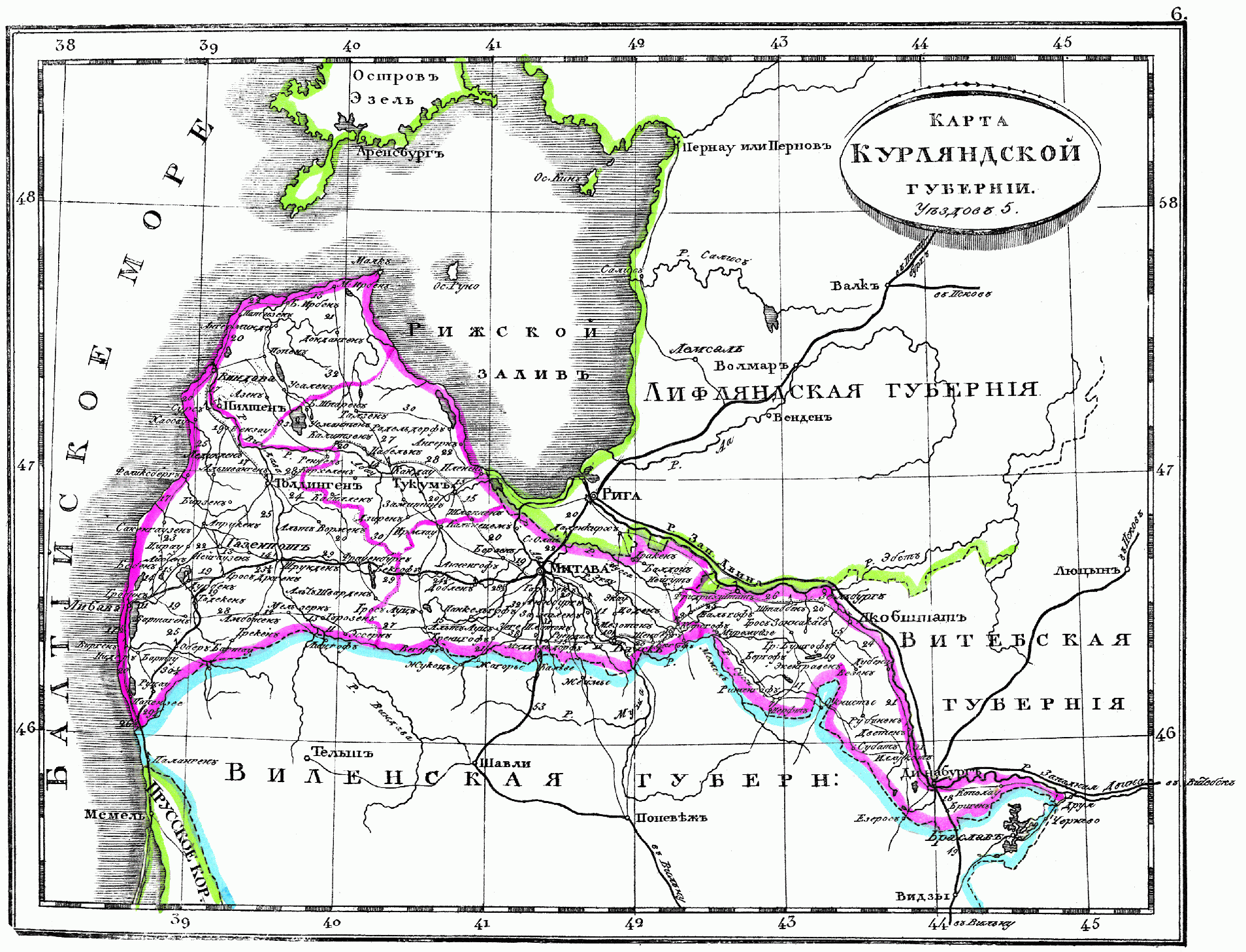
1835 Polangen not in Kurland

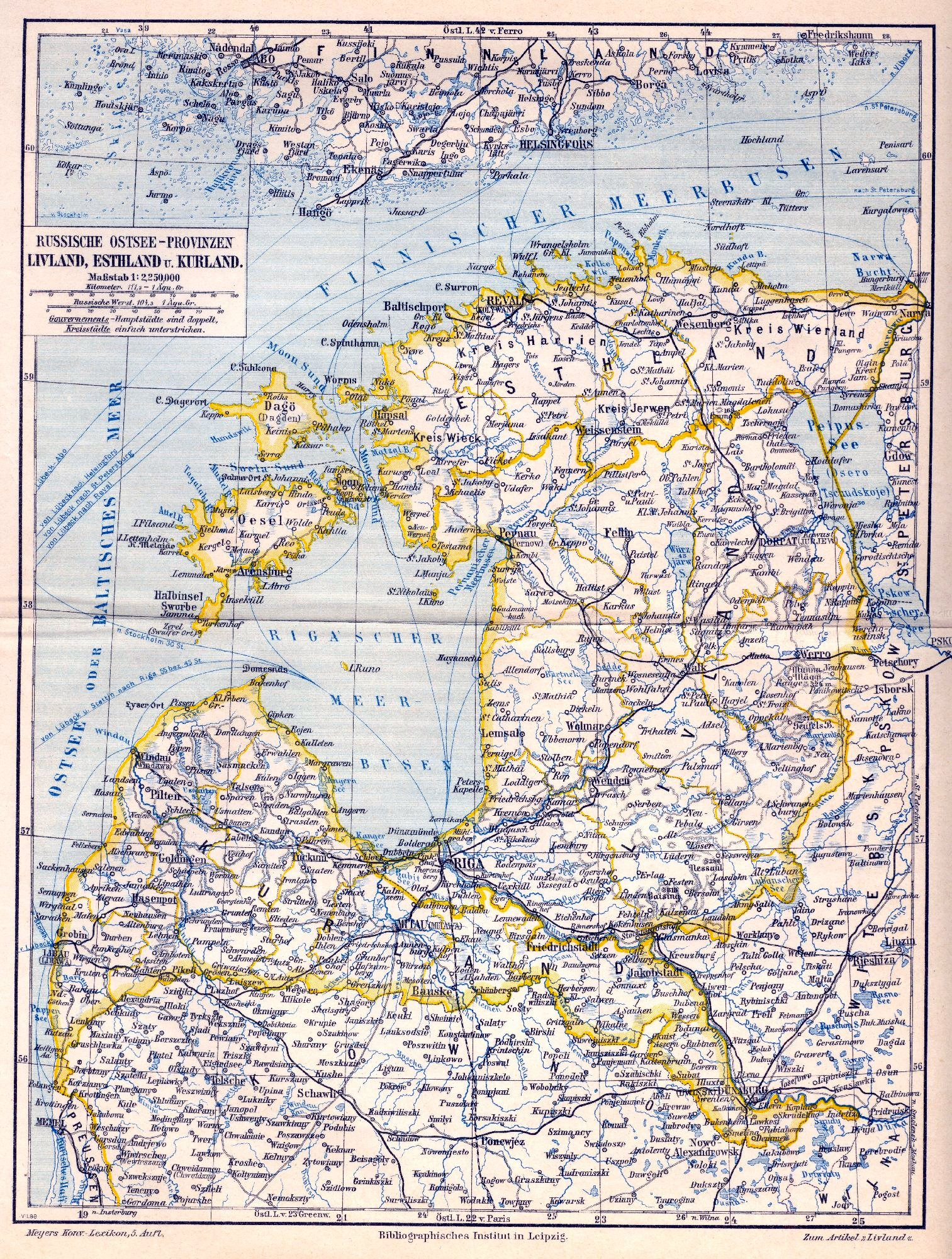
Map of Baltic governorates, Meyers, ca. mid of 1890s - Polangen in Kurland

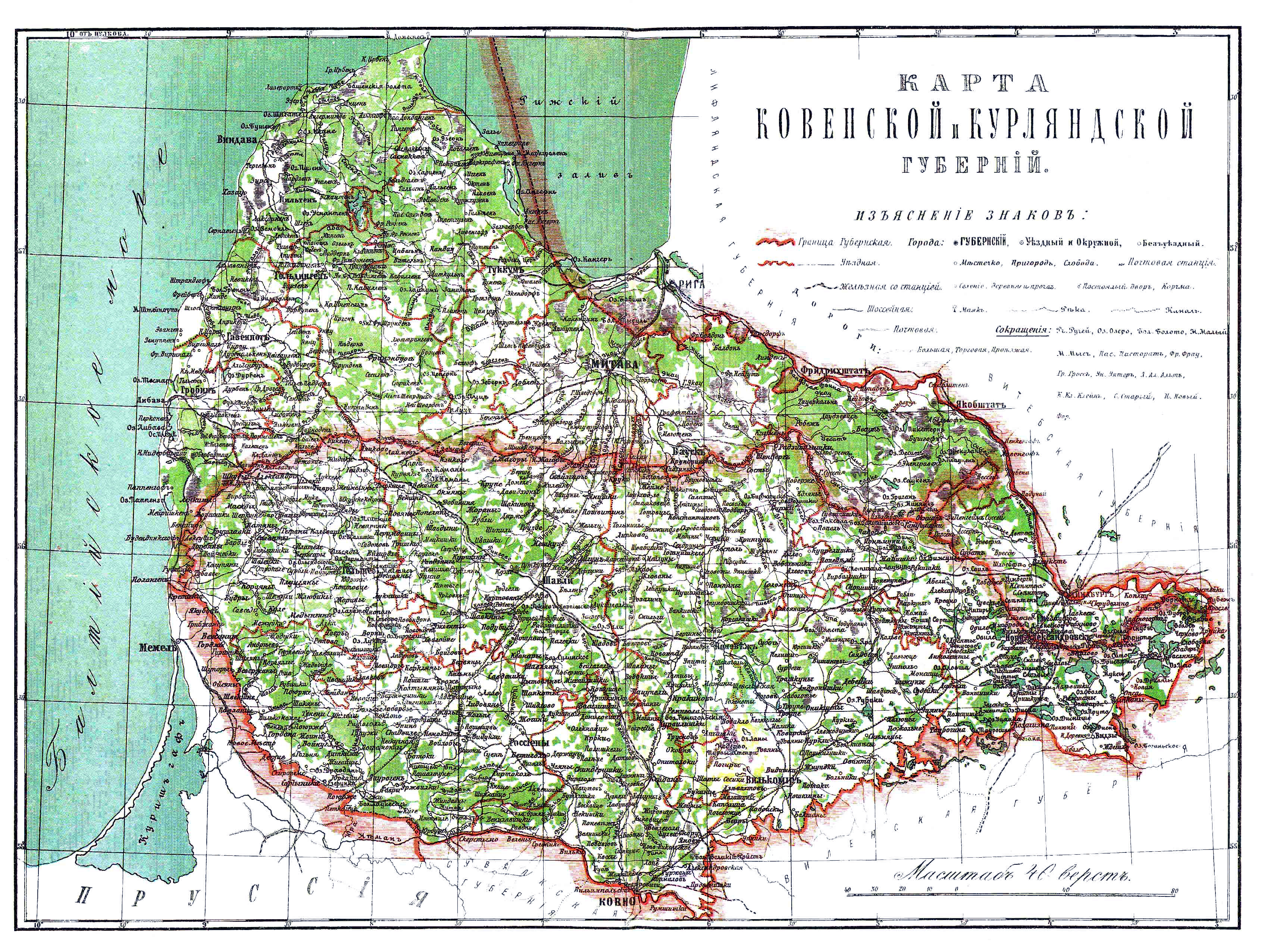
Map of Kurland and Kowno governorates ca 1900 - Polangen in Kurland

Map of Kowno G. and surrounding area 1876 - 1914 - Polangen in Kurland

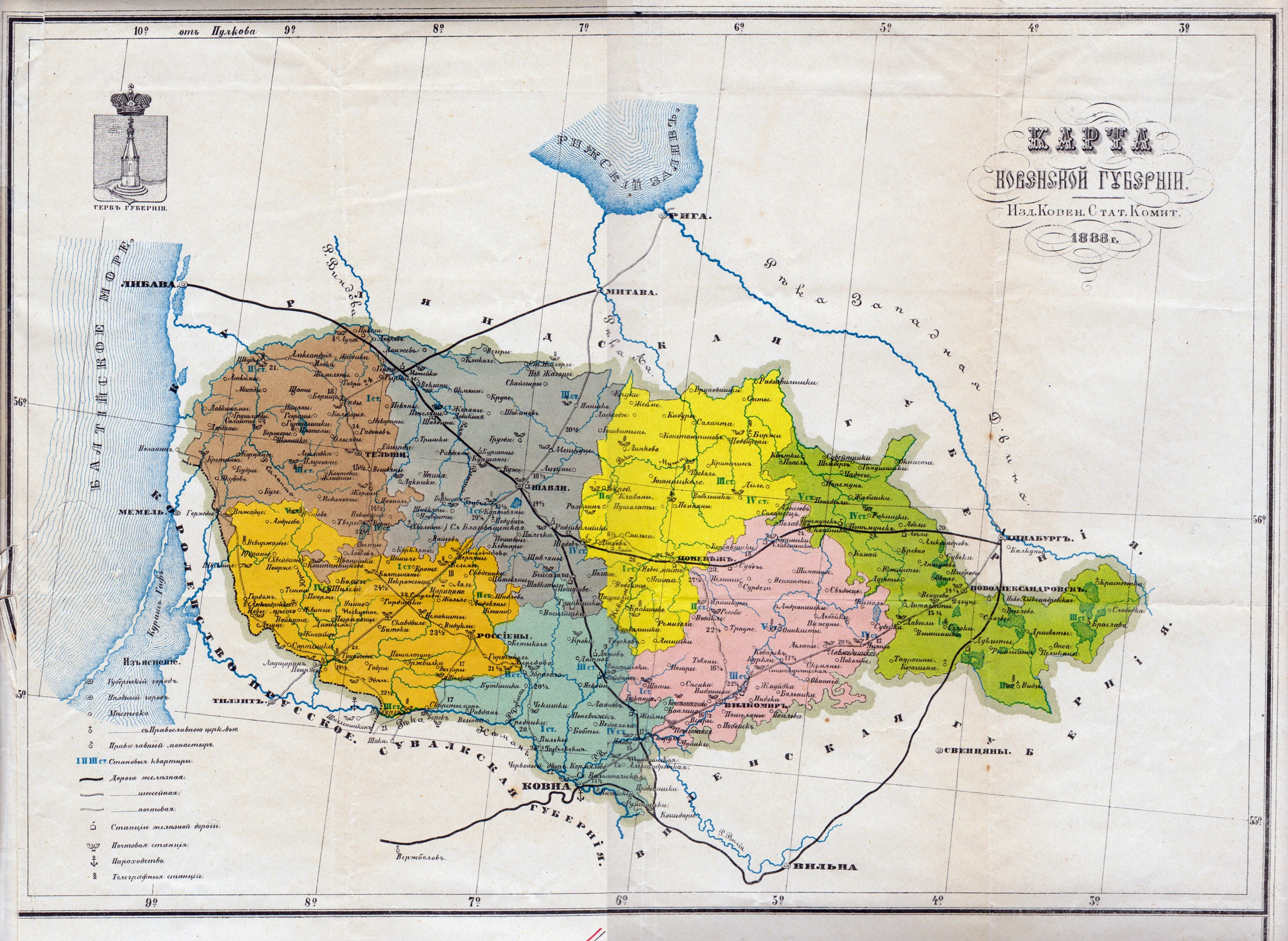
1888 - Polangen in Kurland

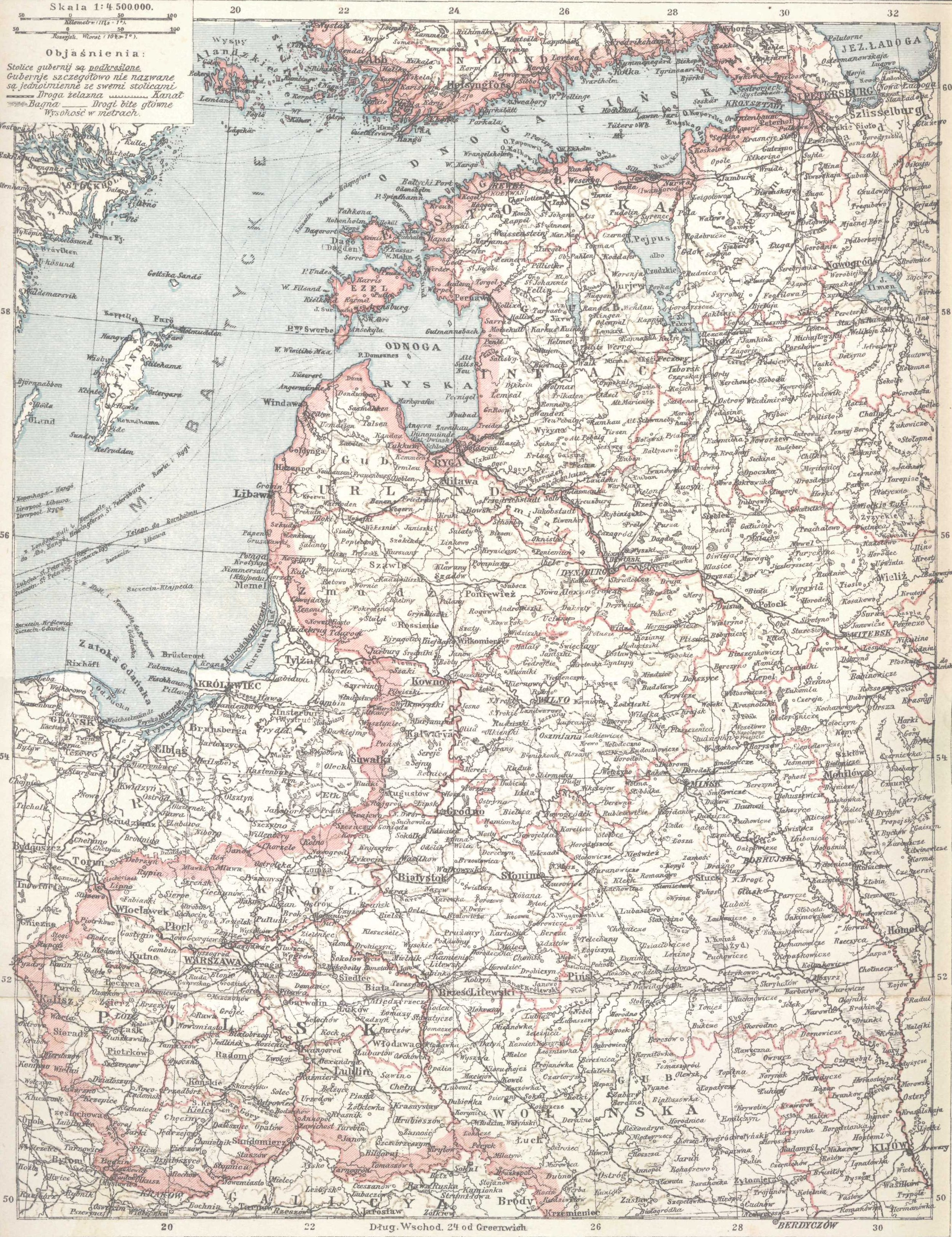
1902 - Polangen in Kurland

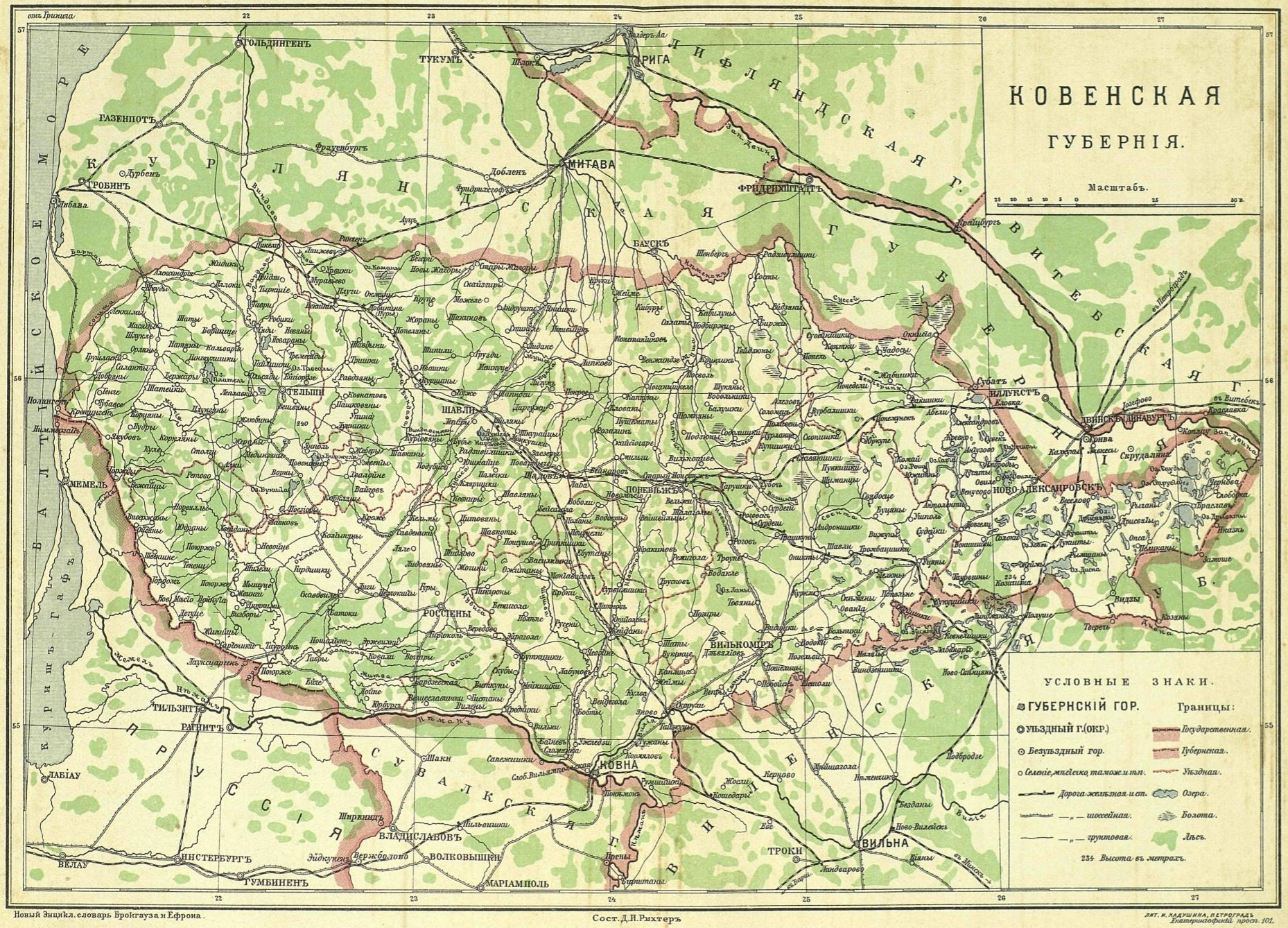
1910 - Polangen in Kurland

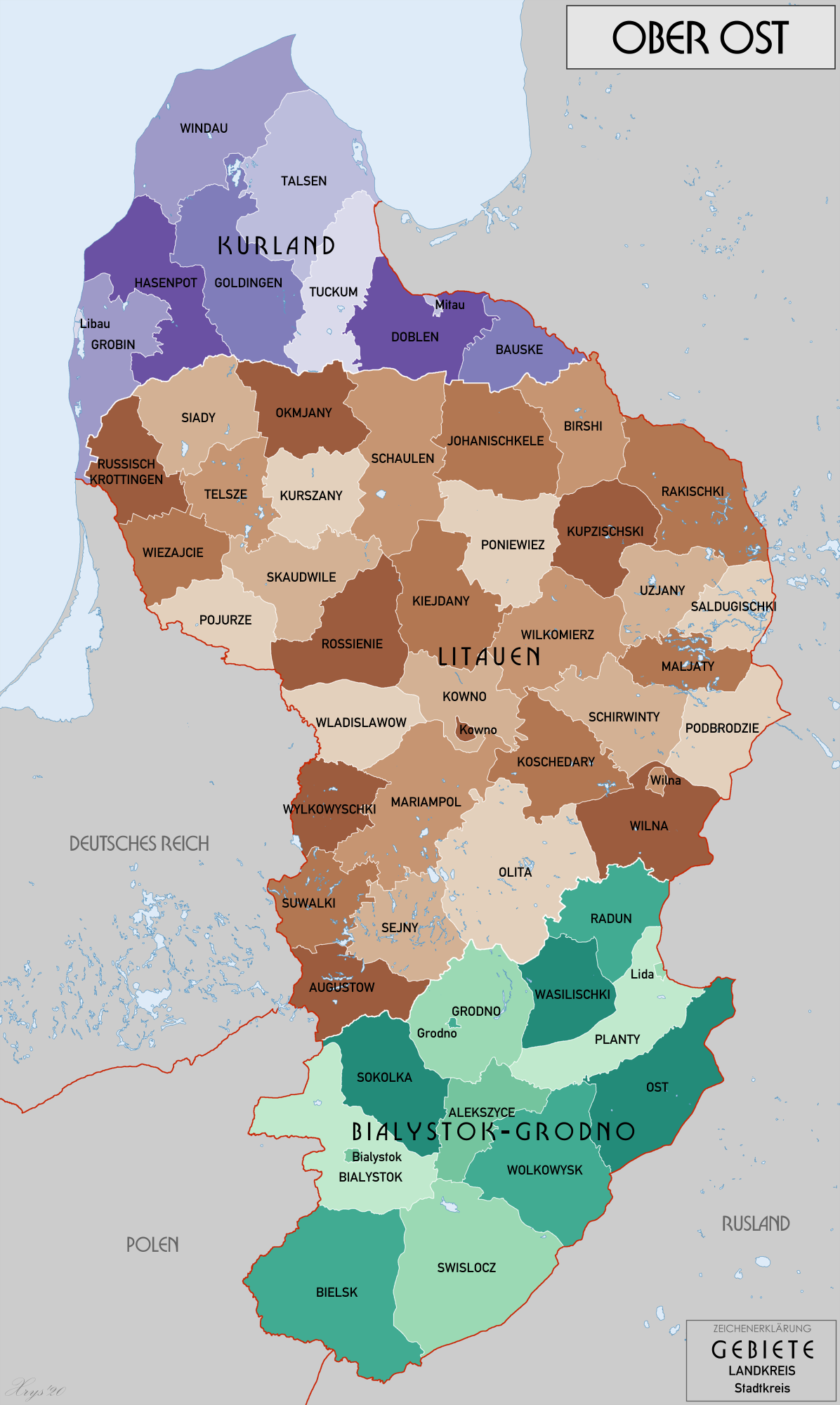
Map of Ober Ost, WWI - Polangen in Kurland

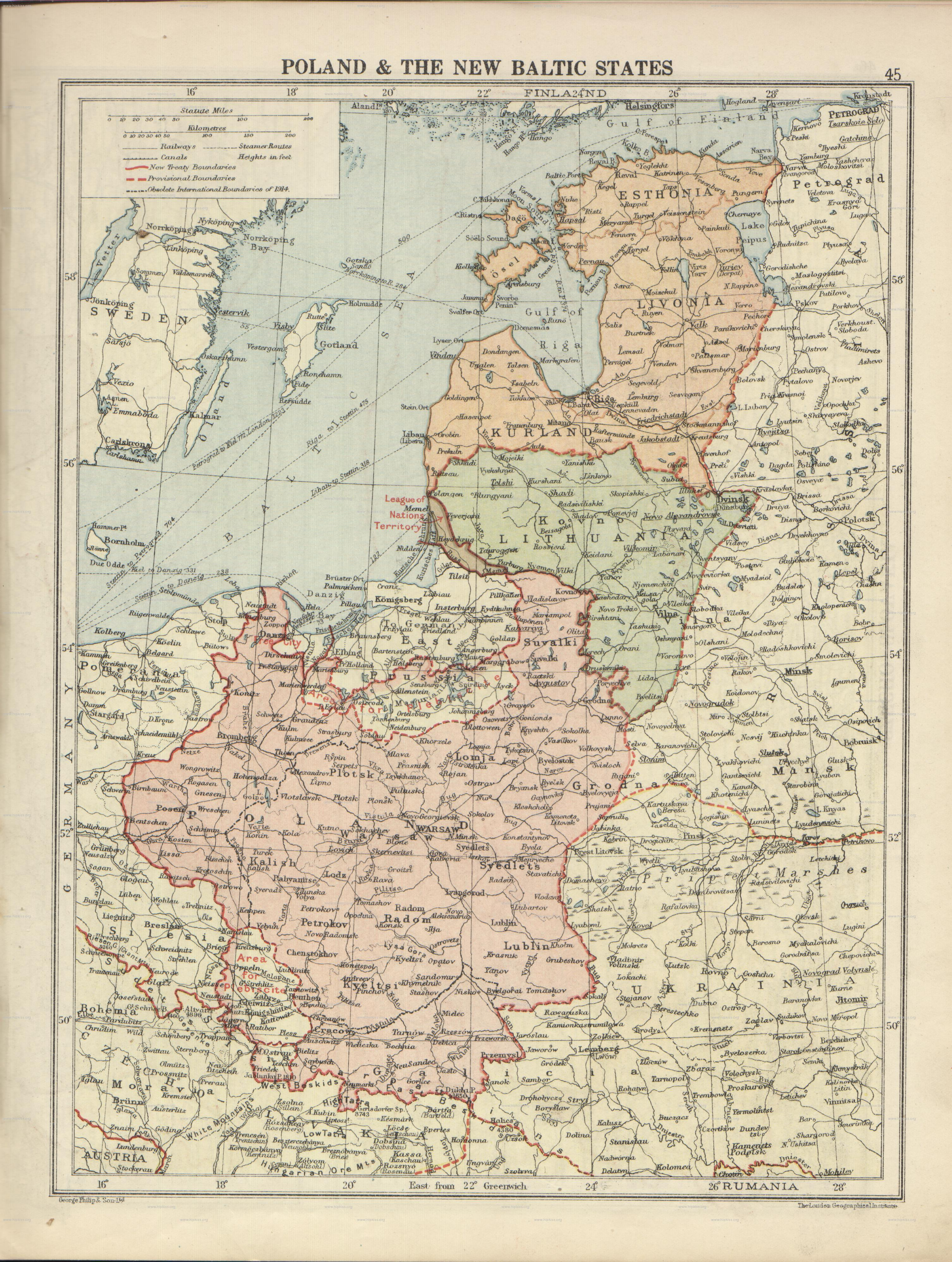
1920 map of Poland and the Balitcs - Polangen in Kurland
