= Priekule Municipality =

Municipality of Latvia

Coordinates: 56°27′N 21°35′E

Priekule Municipality Priekules novads
- Municipality
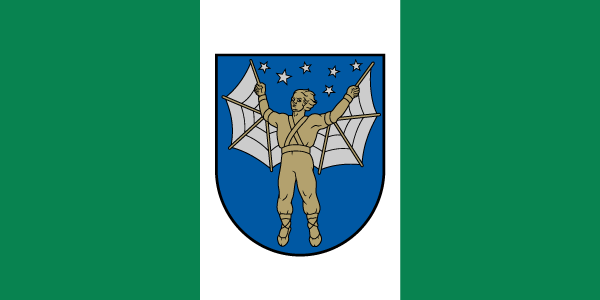
- Flag Coat of arms

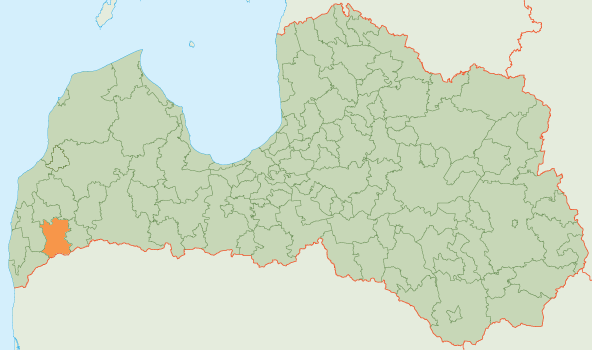
- Country: Latvia
- Formed: 2009
- Centre: Priekule

Government
  - Council Chair: Vija Jablonska (NA)

Area
  - Total: 519.86 km^{2} (200.72 sq mi)
  - Land: 507.26 km^{2} (195.85 sq mi)
  - Water: 12.6 km^{2} (4.9 sq mi)

Population (2021)
  - Total: 4,955
  - Density: 9.768/km^{2} (25.30/sq mi)
- Website: www.priekule.lv

Priekule Municipality (Latvian: Priekules novads) is a former municipality in Courland, Latvia. The municipality was formed in 2009 by merging Bunka Parish, Virga Parish, Gramzda Parish, Kalēti Parish, Priekule Parish and Priekule town the administrative centre being Priekule. As of 2020, the population was 4,997.

Priekule Municipality ceased to exist on 1 July 2021, when it was merged into the newly formed South Kurzeme Municipality.

== See also ==
- Administrative divisions of Latvia (2009)
