= Durbe Municipality =

Municipality of Latvia

Coordinates: 56.6167°N 21.3667°E

Durbe Municipality Durbes novads
- Municipality
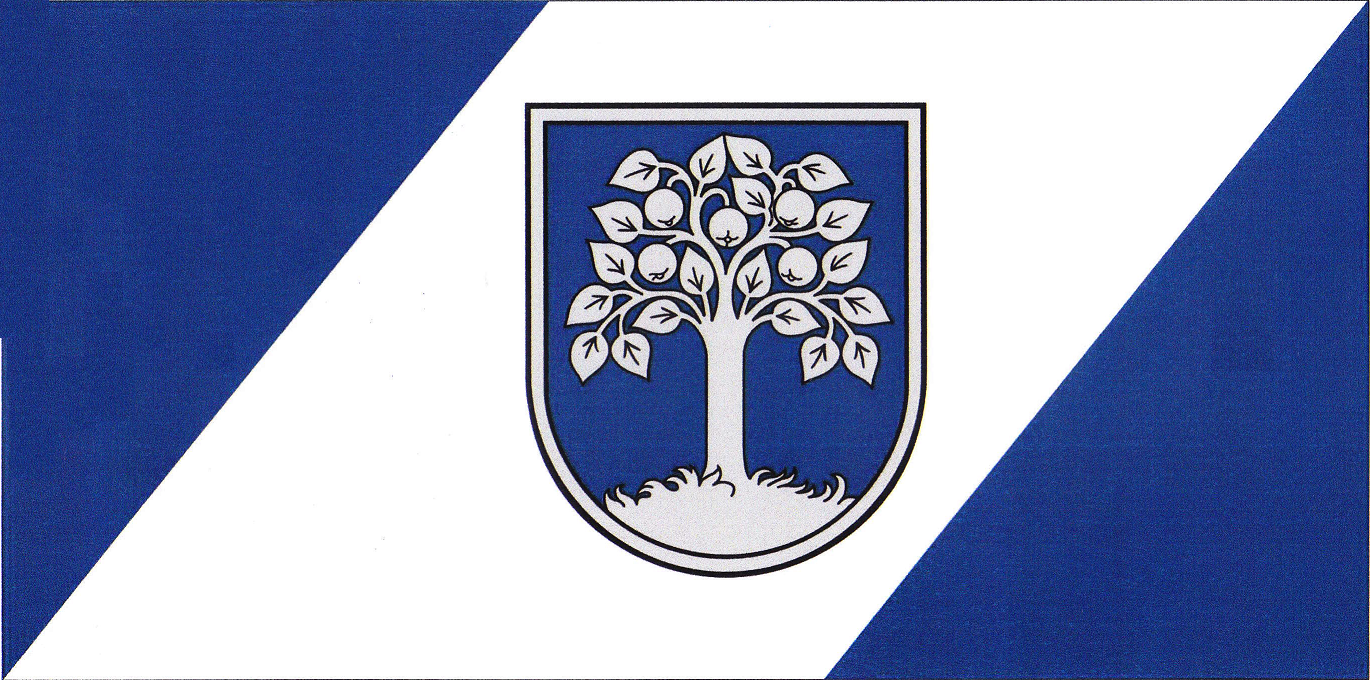
- Flag Coat of arms

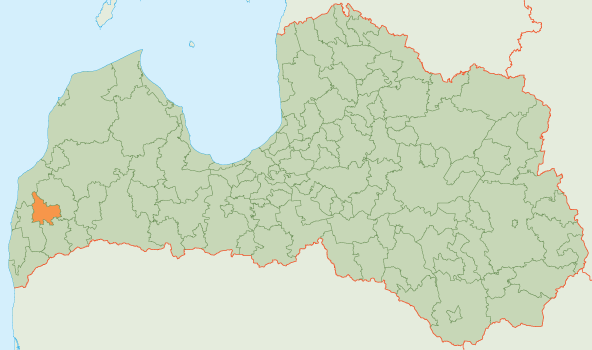
- Country: Latvia
- Formed: 2000
- Centre: Lieģi

Government
  - Chairman: Ojārs Petrēvics (LZS)

Area
  - Total: 320.44 km^{2} (123.72 sq mi)
  - Land: 303.98 km^{2} (117.37 sq mi)
  - Water: 16.46 km^{2} (6.36 sq mi)

Population (2021)
  - Total: 2,620
  - Density: 8.62/km^{2} (22.3/sq mi)
- Website: www.durbe.lv

Durbe Municipality (Latvian: Durbes novads) is a former municipality in Courland, Latvia. The municipality was formed in 2000 by merging Tadaiķi parish and Durbe town with its countryside territory. In 2009 it absorbed Dunalka parish and Vecpils parish, the administrative centre being Lieģi. As of 2020, the population was 2,601.

Durbe Municipality ceased to exist on 1 July 2021, when it was merged into the newly formed South Kurzeme Municipality.

== See also ==
- Administrative divisions of Latvia (2009)
