= Dunalka Manor =

Manor house in Latvia

- Location within Latvia

General information
- Location: Dunalka, Dunalka Parish, South Kurzeme Municipality, Courland, Latvia
- Coordinates: 56°41′09″N 21°19′49″E

Dunalka Manor (Latvian: Dunalkas muiža, German: Gut Dubenalken) is a manor house with surrounding complex of buildings in Dunalka, Dunalka Parish, South Kurzeme Municipality, in the historical region of Courland, in western Latvia.

== History ==
Manor centre includes also ruins of the late medieval Dunalka Old Manor.

== See also ==
- List of palaces and manor houses in Latvia
