= Grobiņa Municipality =

Municipality of Latvia

Coordinates: 56.5667°N 21.1000°E

Grobiņa Municipality Grobiņas novads
- Municipality
- Flag Coat of arms

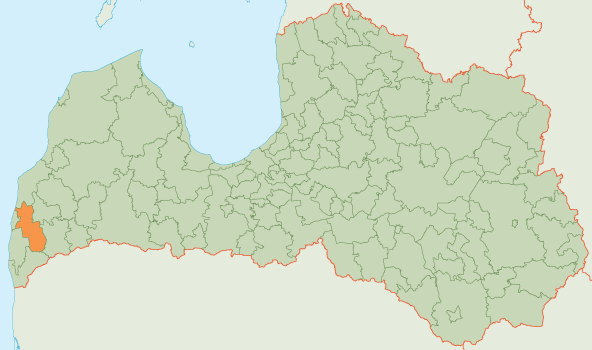
- Country: Latvia
- Formed: 2009
- Dissolved: 2021
- Centre: Grobiņa

Government
  - Chairman: Aivars Priedols (last) (LZS)

Area
  - Total: 489.96 km^{2} (189.17 sq mi)
  - Land: 474.47 km^{2} (183.19 sq mi)
  - Water: 15.49 km^{2} (5.98 sq mi)

Population (2021)
  - Total: 8,329
  - Density: 17.55/km^{2} (45.47/sq mi)
- Website: www.grobina.lv

Grobiņa Municipality (Latvian: Grobiņas novads) was a municipality in Courland, Latvia. The municipality was formed in 2009 by merging Bārta Parish, Gavieze Parish, Grobiņa Parish, Medze Parish and the town of Grobiņa with the administrative centre being Grobiņa. The population in 2020 was 8,347.

Grobiņa Municipality ceased to exist on 1 July 2021, when it was merged into the newly formed South Kurzeme Municipality.

== Notable countrymen ==
- Georg Friedism Sigismund von Bilterling (Georg Sigismund von Bilterling, 1733-1803) — pastor and teacher
- Jānis Birznieks (1895-1955) — politician
- Ernests Feldmanis (1889-1947) — actor
- Andrejs Freimanis (1914-1994) — officer of the Latvian Legion, recipient of the Knight's Cross of the Iron Cross
- Archibald von Keyserling (1882-1951) — first Latvian Naval Forces admiral
- Eduard Schmidt von der Launitz ( Eduard Schmidt von der Launitz , 1796-1869) — German sculptor
- Ansis Petrevics (1882-1941) — politician and minister in the Latvian government
- Fricis Rokpelnis (1909-1969) — writer

== See also ==
- Administrative divisions of Latvia (2009)
