= List of sister cities in Georgia =

List of sister cities in Georgia may refer to:

- List of twin towns and sister cities in Georgia (country)
- List of sister cities in Georgia (U.S. state)

== See also ==
- List of cities and towns in Georgia (disambiguation)
