= Kapsēde =

Suburb of Liepāja, Latvia

Coordinates: 56°35′N 21°08′E

- Suburb (Lielciems)
- Interactive map of Kapsēde
- Country: Latvia
- Municipality: South Kurzeme
- Parish: Medze

Population (2021)
  - Total: 456

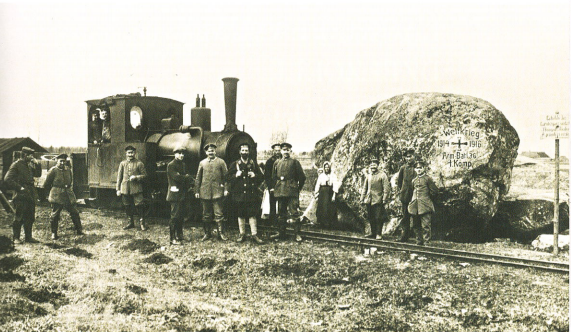
Lithuanian soldiers and local residents on the Liepāja-Ziemupe 600 mm narrow-gauge railway at the Kapsēde stone in front of an 'O&K' steam locomotive, ca 1916-1917

Kapsēde is one of the suburbs of Liepāja, Latvia.
