= Priekule =

Priekule can refer to:

- Priekule, Latvia
- Priekulė, Klaipėda, in Lithuania
