= List of municipalities in Georgia =

List of municipalities in Georgia can refer to:

- List of municipalities in Georgia (country)
- List of municipalities in Georgia (U.S. state)

== See also ==
- List of cities and towns in Georgia (disambiguation)
