= Lieģi =

Village in Latvia

- Village
- Location within Latvia
- Coordinates: 56°34′55.38″N 21°20′3.24″E
- Country: Latvia
- Municipality: South Kurzeme
- Parish: Tadaiķi

Population (2005)
  - Total: 557

Lieģi (also Jaunlieģi) is a village in the Tadaiķi Parish of South Kurzeme Municipality in the Courland region of Latvia.
