= Dunalka Old Manor =

Manor house in Latvia

Dunalka Manor
- Location within Latvia
- Interactive map of the Dunalka Manor area

General information
- Architectural style: Ruins
- Location: Dunalka, Dunalka Parish, South Kurzeme Municipality, Courland, Latvia
- Coordinates: 56°41′09″N 21°19′49″E
- Completed: after 1578

Dunalka Old Manor is a fortified late medieval manor house in Dunalka, Dunalka Parish, South Kurzeme Municipality, in the historical region of Courland, in western Latvia.

== See also ==
- List of castles in Latvia
