= List of twin towns and sister cities in Georgia (country) =

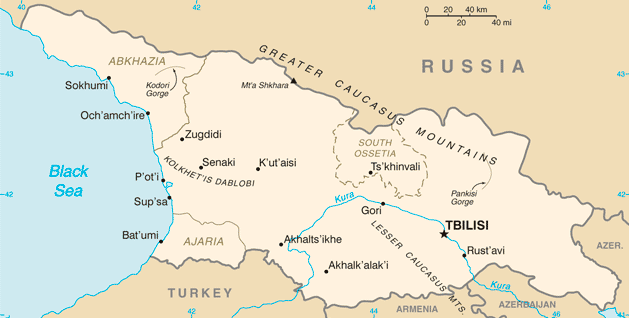
Map of Georgia

This is a list of municipalities in Georgia which have standing links to local communities in other countries known as "town twinning" (usually in Europe) or "sister cities" (usually in the rest of the world).

== A ==
Abasha

- Jevíčko, Czech Republic

Akhaltsikhe

- Ardahan, Turkey

Akhmeta

- Bilhorod-Dnistrovskyi, Ukraine
- Ialoveni District, Moldova
- Panevėžys District Municipality, Lithuania
- Akhmeta, Czech Republic

== B ==
Batumi

- Ashdod, Israel
- Bari, Italy
- Brest, Belarus
- Burgas, Bulgaria
- Constanța, Romania
- Daugavpils, Latvia
- Jūrmala, Latvia
- Kuşadası, Turkey
- Marbella, Spain
- Nakhchivan, Azerbaijan
- Netanya, Israel
- Ordu, Turkey
- Paphos, Cyprus
- Prague 1 (Prague), Czech Republic
- Nysa, Poland
- Savannah, United States
- Sharm El Sheikh, Egypt
- Ternopil, Ukraine
- Trabzon, Turkey
- Ürümqi, China
- Vanadzor, Armenia
- Volos, Greece
- Wrocław, Poland
- Yalova, Turkey

Borjomi

- Legionowo, Poland
- Madona, Latvia
- Poltava, Ukraine

== C ==
Chiatura

- Birštonas, Lithuania
- Keila, Estonia
- Murgul, Turkey
- Sigulda, Latvia

Chokhatauri

- Pasvalys, Lithuania

== G ==
Gori

- Białystok, Poland
- Kartuzy, Poland
- Lod, Israel
- Melitopol, Ukraine
- Orzysz, Poland
- Pavlohrad, Ukraine
- Priekule, Latvia
- Raciechowice, Poland
- Salacgrīva (Limbaži), Latvia

Gurjaani

- Haradok, Belarus
- Pakruojis, Lithuania
- Piaseczno County, Poland
- Vynnyky, Ukraine

== K ==
Khashuri

- Bauska, Latvia
- Hedemora, Sweden
- Horki, Belarus
- Obukhiv, Ukraine
- Radviliškis, Lithuania
- Zviahel, Ukraine

Khoni

- Andrychów, Poland
- Boschi Sant'Anna, Italy
- Elista, Russia
- Izium, Ukraine
- Tukums, Latvia

Kobuleti

- Akhtala, Armenia
- Alaverdi, Armenia
- Babruysk, Belarus
- Milicz, Poland
- Myrnohrad, Ukraine
- Narva, Estonia
- Oborniki, Poland
- Palanga, Lithuania
- Piekary Śląskie, Poland
- Pivdenne, Ukraine
- Priekule, Latvia
- Rivne, Ukraine
- Selçuk, Turkey
- Valga, Estonia

Kutaisi

- Ashkelon, Israel
- Columbia, United States
- Dnipro, Ukraine
- Ganja, Azerbaijan
- Gomel, Belarus
- Karşıyaka, Turkey
- Kharkiv, Ukraine
- Laiwu (Jinan), China
- Lviv, Ukraine
- Mykolaiv, Ukraine
- Nanchang, China
- Newport, Wales, United Kingdom
- Poznań, Poland
- Sumy, Ukraine
- Szombathely, Hungary
- Ungheni, Moldova
- Valka, Latvia
- Zhytomyr, Ukraine

Kvareli

- Engure, Latvia
- Plungė, Lithuania

== L ==
Lagodekhi

- Ostrołęka, Poland
- Viļāni, Latvia

Lanchkhuti

- Kupiškis, Lithuania

== M ==
Martvili

- Ardeşen, Turkey
- Boyarka, Ukraine
- Czarnków, Poland
- Jevíčko, Czech Republic
- Odolanów, Poland

Mtskheta

- Fındıklı, Turkey
- Irpin, Ukraine
- Kuldīga, Latvia
- Leuville-sur-Orge, France
- Myrhorod, Ukraine
- Nesebar, Bulgaria
- Pereiaslav, Ukraine
- Ružinov (Bratislava), Slovakia
- Svietlahorsk, Belarus
- Trakai, Lithuania
- Ünye, Turkey
- Vagharshapat, Armenia

== O ==
Ozurgeti

- Boyarka, Ukraine
- Chełm, Poland
- Rokiškis, Lithuania

== P ==
Poti

- Berdiansk, Ukraine
- Chornomorsk, Ukraine
- Kiryat Yam, Israel
- LaGrange, United States
- Larnaca, Cyprus
- Nafplio, Greece
- Östhammar, Sweden
- Pazar, Turkey
- Sevastopol, Ukraine
- Shanwei, China
- Yazd, Iran

== R ==
Rustavi

- Akmenė, Lithuania
- Cherkasy, Ukraine
- İnegöl, Turkey
- Ivano-Frankivsk, Ukraine
- Kiruna, Sweden
- Kryvyi Rih, Ukraine
- Łódź, Poland
- Panevėžys, Lithuania
- Płock, Poland
- Sumgait, Azerbaijan
- Zhodzina, Belarus

== S ==
Sagarejo

- Širvintos, Lithuania

Senaki

- Bila Tserkva, Ukraine
- Rakvere, Estonia

== T ==
Tbilisi

- Ankara, Turkey
- Astana, Kazakhstan
- Atlanta, United States
- Baku, Azerbaijan
- Bilbao, Spain
- Bristol, England, United Kingdom
- Bucharest, Romania
- Cairo, Egypt
- Chișinău, Moldova
- Doha, Qatar
- Innsbruck, Austria
- Istanbul, Turkey
- Kraków, Poland
- Kyiv, Ukraine
- Ljubljana, Slovenia
- Lublin, Poland
- Minsk, Belarus
- Nantes, France
- Palermo, Italy
- Saarbrücken, Germany
- Sofia, Bulgaria
- Tehran, Iran
- Vilnius, Lithuania
- Yerevan, Armenia

Telavi

- Anykščiai, Lithuania
- Arkadag, Turkmenistan
- Balta, Ukraine
- Bešeňová, Slovakia
- Biberach an der Riss, Germany
- Hlybokaye, Belarus
- Kėdainiai, Lithuania
- Kletsk, Belarus
- Laoag, Philippines
- Shaki, Azerbaijan
- Talsi, Latvia
- Viljandi, Estonia

Tsqaltubo

- Kirovsk, Ukraine
- Polotsk, Belarus
- Saldus, Latvia
- Truskavets, Ukraine
- Vanadzor, Armenia

== Z ==
Zugdidi

- Columbus, United States
- Jonava, Lithuania
- Pokrovsk, Ukraine
