= Cimdenieki =

Village in Latvia

- Village
- Cimdenieki's location in Latvia
- Coordinates: 56°31′31″N 21°05′40″E
- Country: Latvia
- Municipality: South Kurzeme
- Parish: Grobiņa

Population (2005)
  - Total: 448
- Postal code: LV-3430

Cimdenieki is a small suburban settlement in Grobiņa Parish, South Kurzeme Municipality in the Courland region of Latvia. The river Ālande flows through Cimdenieki.

Cimdenieki is mostly known for its proximity to Liepāja International Airport.
