= Durbe =

Town in South Kurzeme Municipality, Latvia

- Town
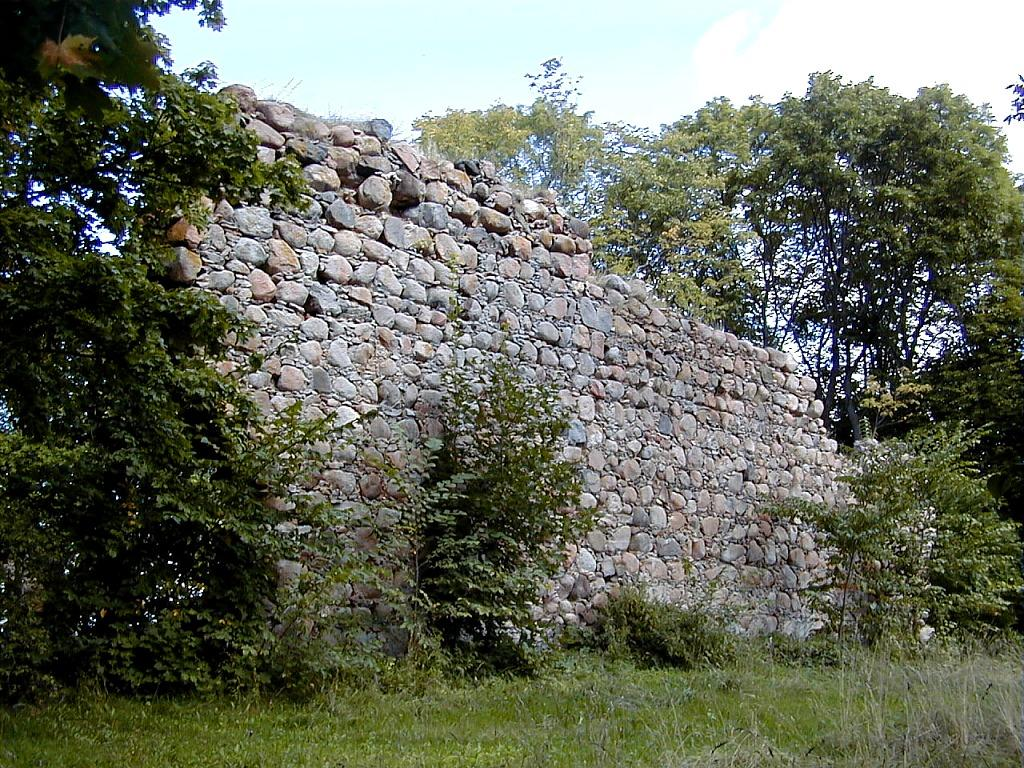
- Durbe castle ruins

- Flag Coat of arms

- Location in Latvia
- Coordinates: 56°35′20″N 21°22′10″E
- Country: Latvia
- Municipality: South Kurzeme Municipality
- Town rights: 1893

Area
  - Total: 2.22 km^{2} (0.86 sq mi)
  - Land: 2.17 km^{2} (0.84 sq mi)
  - Water: 0.05 km^{2} (0.019 sq mi)

Population (2026)
  - Total: 475
  - Density: 219/km^{2} (567/sq mi)
- Time zone: UTC+2 (EET)
  - Summer (DST): UTC+3 (EEST)
- Postal code: LV-3440
- Calling code: +371 634
- Website: www.durbe.lv

Durbe (German: Durben, Lithuanian: Durbė, Polish: Dorbiany, Russian: Дурбе Durbe/Дурбен Durben) is a town in South Kurzeme Municipality, in the Courland region of Latvia. Durbe was first noted in 1260, when the Battle of Durbe occurred near Lake Durbe. As of 2020, the population was 492. The town is also the extra-territorial center of Durbe Parish.

Town rights were granted to Durbe in 1893 and confirmed in 1917. Durbe manor served as the headquarters of a German brigade in 1917.

The town's coat of arms was granted in 1925: a silver apple tree with seven apples, one for each day of the week. The tree represents the Durbe Apple Orchards, created in the early 20th century by the mayor and city gardener Sīmanis Klēvers. In Latvian folklore, an apple tree is also considered a magical source of youth and sympathy. The city flag was adopted in 2016.

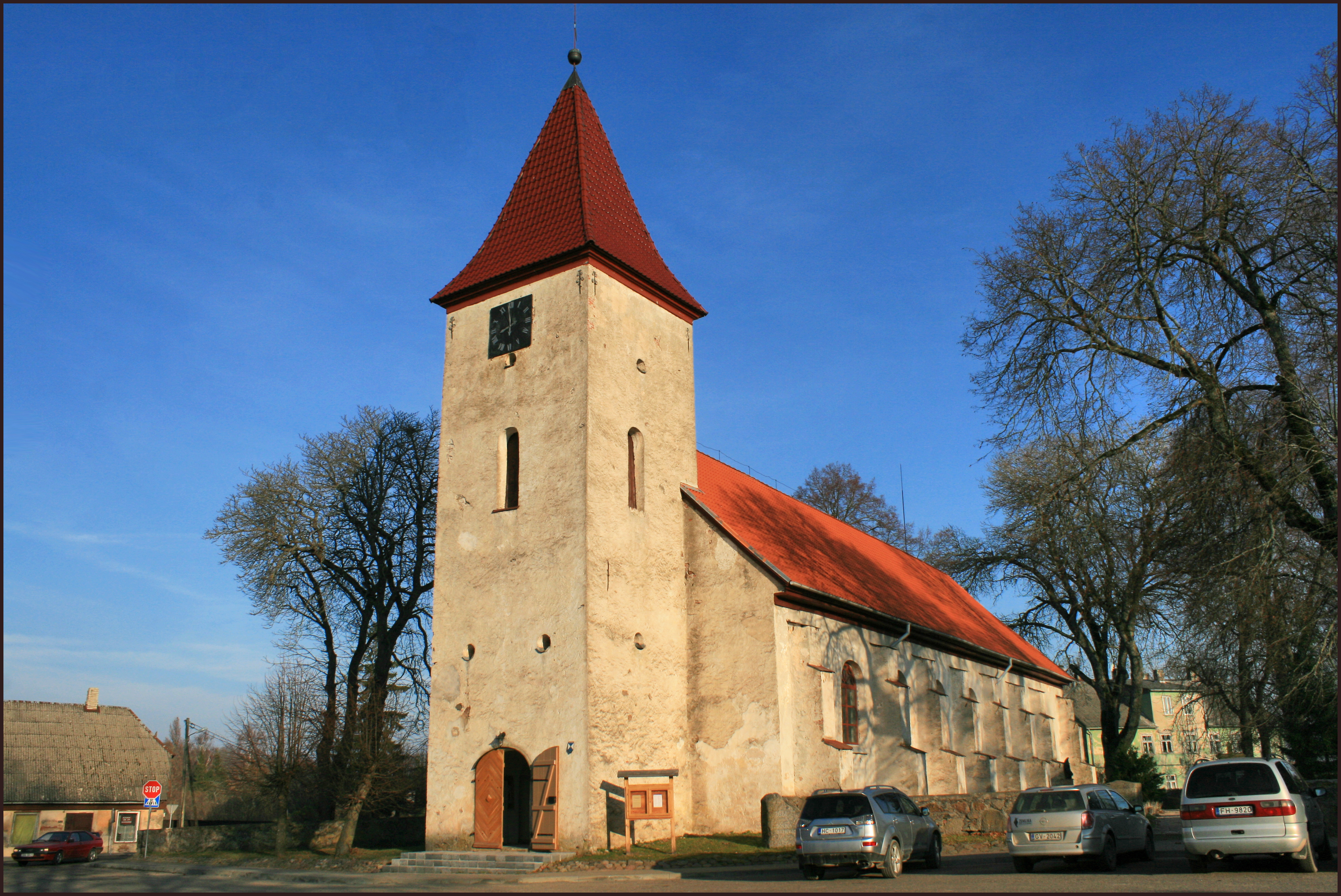
Durbe Lutheran church

== Notable people ==
- Zigfrīds Anna Meierovics (1887–1925), prime minister of Latvia and minister of foreign affairs of Latvia

== See also ==
- List of cities and towns in Latvia
