= Vecpils Parish =

Parish of Latvia

- parish of Latvia
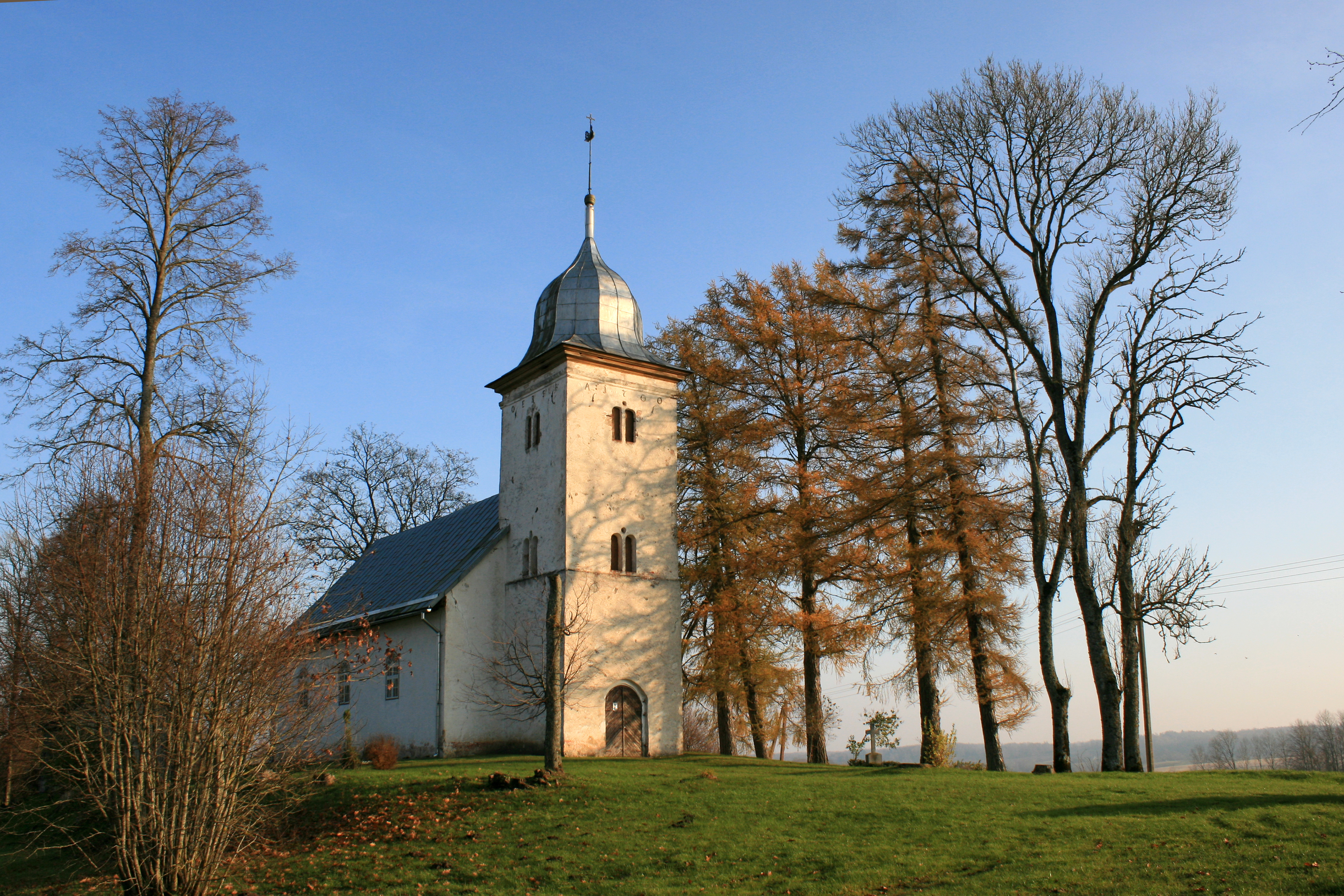

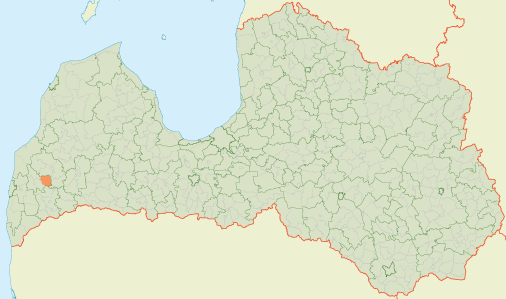
- 56°36′59″N 21°32′05″E
- Country: Latvia

Area
  - Total: 80.07 km^{2} (30.92 sq mi)
  - Land: 76.63 km^{2} (29.59 sq mi)
  - Water: 3.44 km^{2} (1.33 sq mi)

Population (1 January 2024)
  - Total: 390
  - Density: 4.9/km^{2} (13/sq mi)

Vecpils Parish (Latvian: Vecpils pagasts) is an administrative unit of South Kurzeme Municipality, Latvia. The parish has a population of 529 (as of 1/07/2010) and covers an area of 80.2 km^{2}.

== Villages of Vecpils parish ==
- Dižilmāja
- Dižstroķi
- Lekši
- Mazilmāja
- Mazlāņi
- Mazstroķi
- Vecpils (Dižlāņi)

== History ==
Dižilmāja manor (Gut Groß-Ilmajen, Dižilmāja), Dižlāņi manor (Gut Groß-Lahnen, Vecpils (Vecpils parish)) was historically located in the territory of modern Vecpils parish, Gut Kleß-Strohken Manor (Gut Groß-Strohken), Gut Klein-Ilmajen Manor, Gut Klein-Lahnen Manor, Little layers), Vecpils manor (Gut Altenburg).

Vecpils Parish was established around 1890, when Vecpils, Lāņi, Stroķi, Lekši and Ilmāja manor parishes were united. In 1935, the area of the parish was 97.3 km^{2}. In 1945, Vecpils and Stroķu village councils were established in the parish, but in 1949 the parish was liquidated. In 1954, the village of Stroķi was added to the village of Vecpils. In 1958, a part of Aizpute village was added to Vecpils village, but part of Vecpils village was included in Aizpute village. In 1968, part of the territory of the parish was added to Kalvenes village. The village was reorganized into a parish in 1990. From 2009 until 2021, Vecpils Parish was part of the former Durbe municipality.

=== Cultural monuments ===
- Vecpils Catholic Church
- Ilmaja Lutheran Church
- Vecpils castle mound
- An ancient cemetery appears
- Dižlāņu Idol Hill - a place of worship
- Big burial ancient burial ground
