= Kalēti Parish =

Parish of Latvia

- parish of Latvia
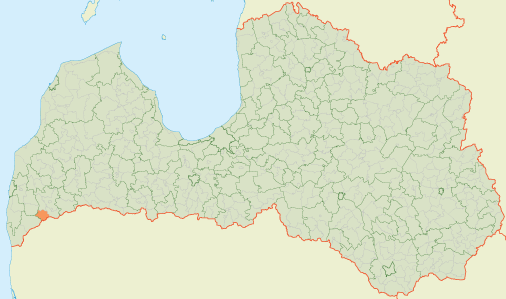
- 56°20′11″N 21°30′07″E
- Country: Latvia

Area
  - Total: 79.77 km^{2} (30.80 sq mi)
  - Land: 77.21 km^{2} (29.81 sq mi)
  - Water: 2.56 km^{2} (0.99 sq mi)

Population (1 January 2026)
  - Total: 479
  - Density: 6.20/km^{2} (16.1/sq mi)

Kalēti Parish (Latvian: Kalētu pagasts) is an administrative unit of South Kurzeme Municipality in the Courland region of Latvia. The parish has a population of 713 (as of 1/07/2013) and covers an area of 79.78 km^{2}.

== Villages of Kalēti parish ==
- Kalēti
- Meiri
- Ozoli
