= Virga Parish =

Parish of Latvia

- parish of Latvia
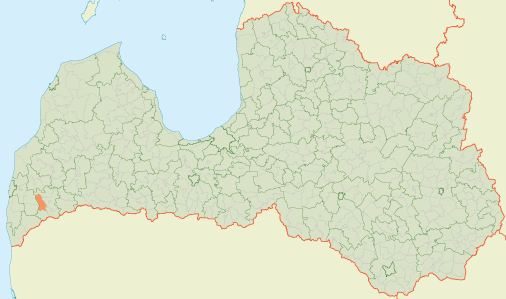
- 56°26′03″N 21°28′12″E

- Location within Latvia
- Country: Latvia

Area
  - Total: 86.27 km^{2} (33.31 sq mi)
  - Land: 83.73 km^{2} (32.33 sq mi)
  - Water: 2.54 km^{2} (0.98 sq mi)

Population (1 January 2026)
  - Total: 676
  - Density: 8.07/km^{2} (20.9/sq mi)

Virga Parish (Latvian: Virgas pagasts) is an administrative unit of South Kurzeme Municipality in the Courland region of Latvia. The parish has a population of 924 (as of 1/07/2013) and covers an area of 86.21 km^{2}.

== Villages of Virga parish ==
- Paplaka
- Paplakas stacija
- Purmsāti
- Virga
