= Bunka Parish =

Parish of Latvia

- parish of Latvia
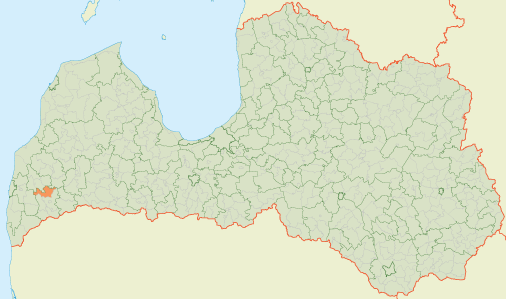
- 56°31′27″N 21°31′27″E
- Country: Latvia

Area
  - Total: 110.89 km^{2} (42.81 sq mi)
  - Land: 107.47 km^{2} (41.49 sq mi)
  - Water: 3.42 km^{2} (1.32 sq mi)

Population (1 January 2025)
  - Total: 751
  - Density: 6.99/km^{2} (18.1/sq mi)

Bunka Parish (Latvian: Bunkas pagasts) is an administrative unit of South Kurzeme Municipality in the Courland region of Latvia. The parish has a population of 980 (as of 1/07/2013) and covers an area of 110.85 km^{2}.

== History ==
When Latvia was a member of the Soviet Union, the parish was the center of the Bunka village council in the Liepāja region. The parish was also located at the center of the Bunka collective farm.

== Villages of Bunka parish ==
- Bunka
- Krote
- Tadaiķi
