= Grobiņa Parish =

Parish of Latvia

- parish of Latvia
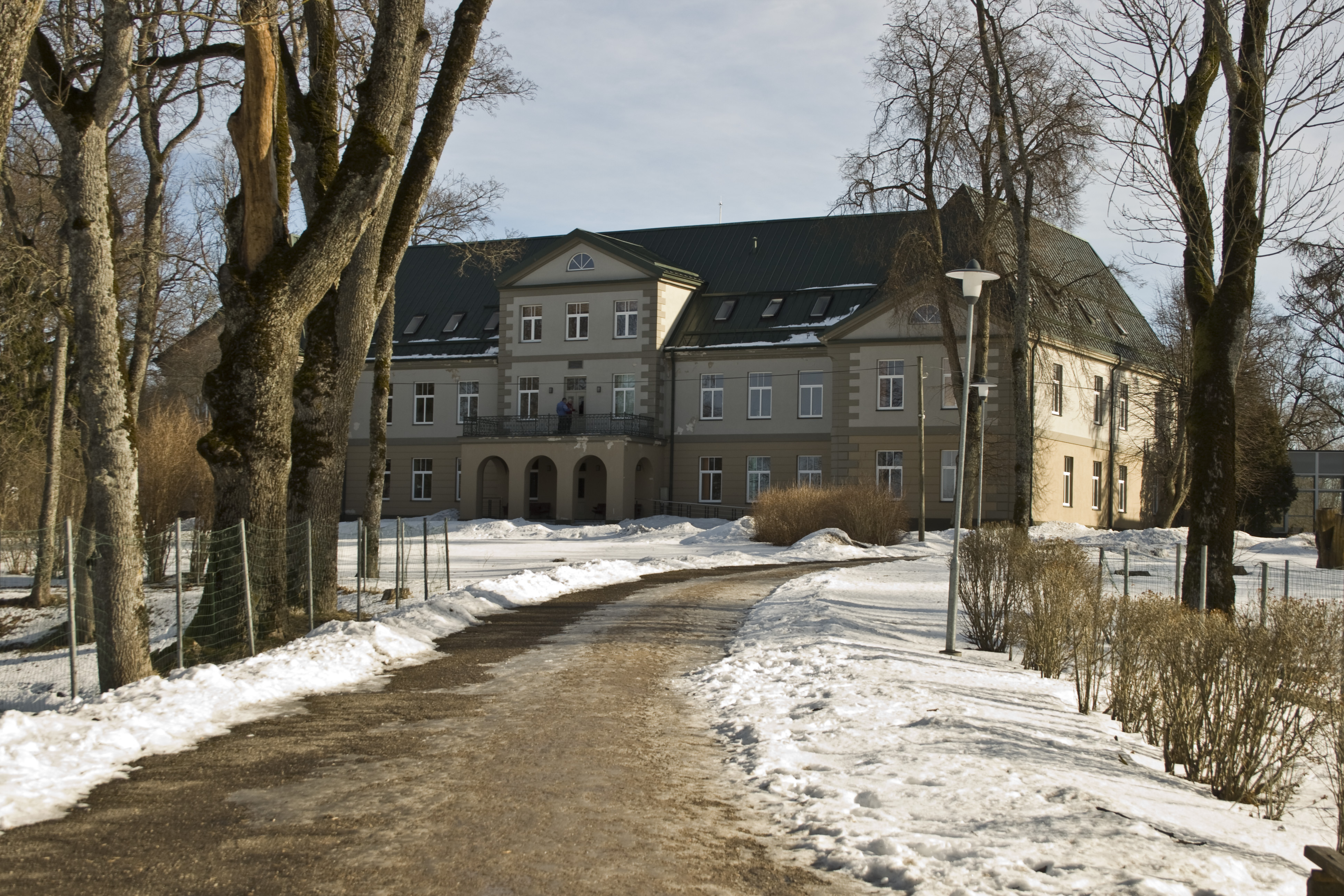

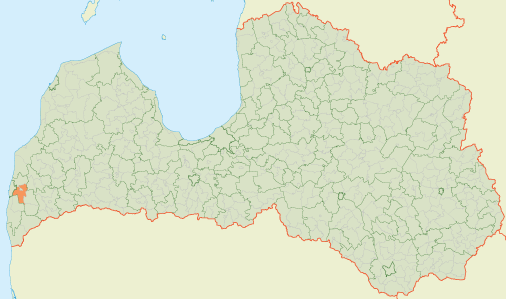
- 56°30′27″N 21°10′12″E
- Country: Latvia

Area
  - Total: 131.37 km^{2} (50.72 sq mi)
  - Land: 120.81 km^{2} (46.65 sq mi)
  - Water: 10.56 km^{2} (4.08 sq mi)

Population (1 January 2026)
  - Total: 2,456
  - Density: 20.33/km^{2} (52.65/sq mi)

Grobiņa Parish (Latvian: Grobiņas pagasts) is an administrative unit of South Kurzeme Municipality in the Courland region of Latvia. The parish has a population of 2,836 (as of 1/07/2010) and covers an area of 131.4 square kilometres (50.7 sq mi). The parish administrative center is Dubeņi.

From 2009 to 2021 the parish was a part of Grobiņa Municipality.

== Villages of Grobiņa Parish ==
- Ālande
- Āres
- Cimdenieki
- Dubeņi
- Gūžas
- Iļģi
- Keramika
- Robežnieki
- Rolava
- Tilti
- Vītiņi
