= Gramzda Parish =

Parish of Latvia

- parish of Latvia
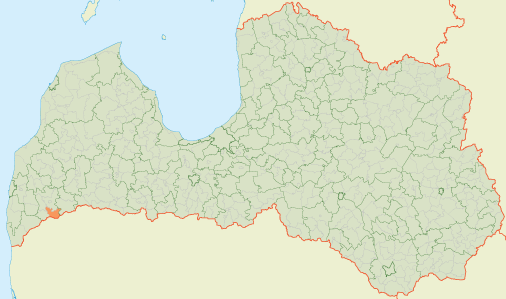
- 56°21′29″N 21°39′24″E
- Country: Latvia

Area
  - Total: 83.17 km^{2} (32.11 sq mi)
  - Land: 83.17 km^{2} (32.11 sq mi)
  - Water: 1.53 km^{2} (0.59 sq mi)

Population (1 January 2024)
  - Total: 580
  - Density: 7.0/km^{2} (18/sq mi)

Gramzda parish shown in now defunct Liepāja district (until 2009)

Gramzda Parish (Latvian: Gramzdas pagasts) is an administrative unit of South Kurzeme Municipality in the Courland region of Latvia. The parish has a population of 732 (as of 1/07/2013) and covers an area of 84.69 km^{2}.

== Villages of Gramzda parish ==
- Aizvīķi
- Dāma
- Gramzda
- Laukmuiža
- Mazdāma
