= Dunalka Parish =

Parish of Latvia

- parish of Latvia
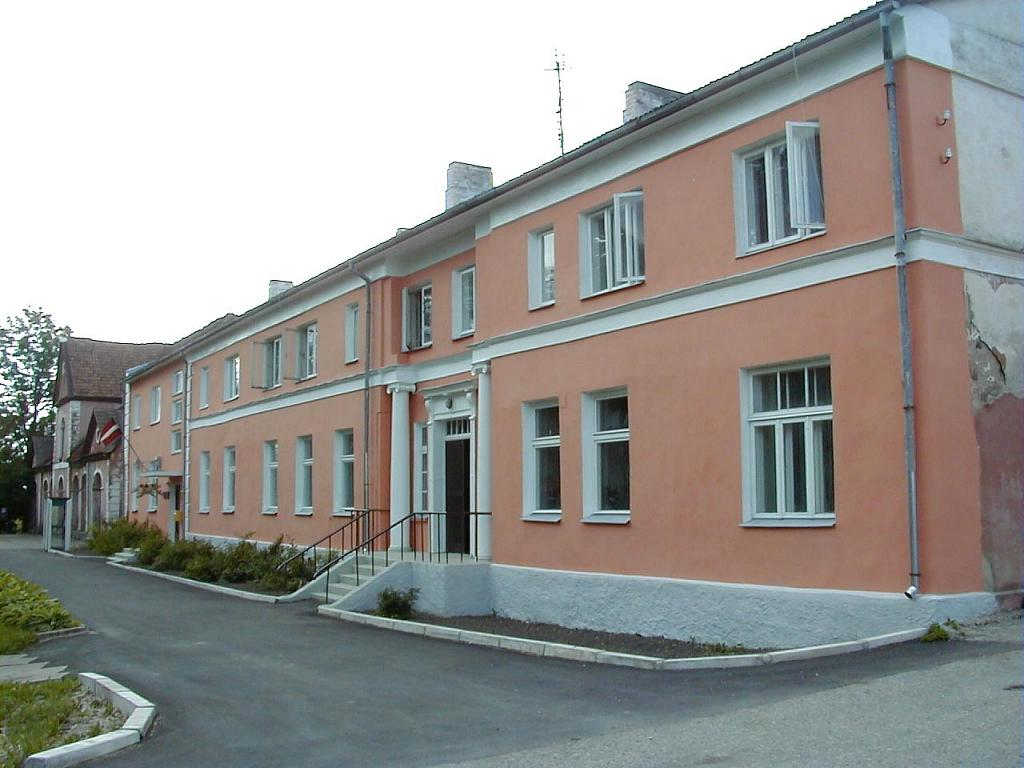

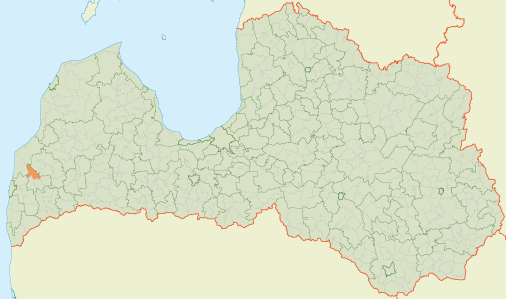
- 56°40′25″N 21°19′50″E
- Country: Latvia

Area
  - Total: 83.58 km^{2} (32.27 sq mi)
  - Land: 83.58 km^{2} (32.27 sq mi)
  - Water: 3.87 km^{2} (1.49 sq mi)

Population (1 January 2024)
  - Total: 578
  - Density: 6.9/km^{2} (18/sq mi)

Dunalka Parish (Latvian: Dunalkas pagasts) is one of the administrative territories of South Kurzeme Municipality, in the Courland region of Latvia. On 1 July 2010, the parish had a population of 802. It covers an area of 87.5 km^{2}. It is bordered by the parishes of Tadaiķi, Durbe, Vecpils, Medze, Vērgale, Saka, Cīrava and Aizpute. The center of the parish is Dunalka.

== Villages of Dunalka parish ==
- Dunalka
- Dunalkas skola
- Dupļi
- Rāva

== See also ==
- Dunalka Manor
- Dunalka Old Manor
