= Medze Parish =

Parish of Latvia

- parish of Latvia
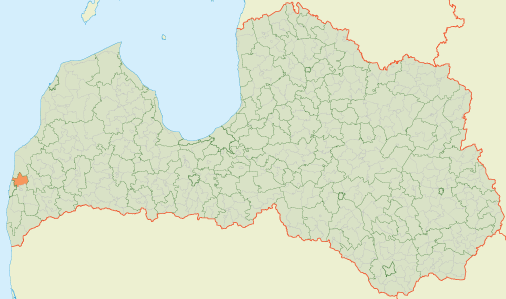
- 56°36′38″N 21°09′18″E
- Country: Latvia

Area
  - Total: 108.99 km^{2} (42.08 sq mi)
  - Land: 106.35 km^{2} (41.06 sq mi)
  - Water: 2.64 km^{2} (1.02 sq mi)

Population (1 January 2025)
  - Total: 1,383
  - Density: 13.00/km^{2} (33.68/sq mi)

Medze Parish (Latvian: Medzes pagasts) is an administrative unit of South Kurzeme Municipality in the Courland region of Latvia. The parish has a population of 1,558 (as of 1 July 2010) and covers an area of 109.2 km^{2}.

Parish center - Kapsēde.

== Villages of Medze parish ==
- Ievkalni
- Kapsēde
- Medzes muiža
- Piņķi
- Plienkalni (Kapsēdes stacija)
- Stirnas
- Šķēde
- Tāši

== History ==
Medzes parish was formed around 1900. In 2009 Medzes parish was included in the administrative Grobiņa Municipality.
