= Gavieze Parish =

Administrative unit of Grobiņa Municipality, Latvia

- parish of Latvia
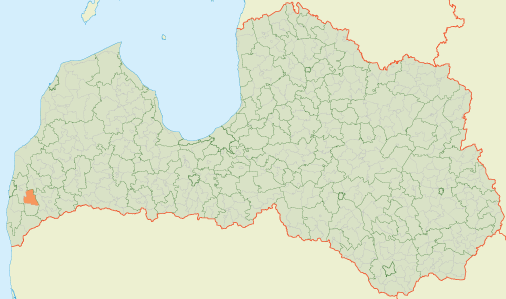
- 56°28′09″N 21°18′56″E
- Country: Latvia

Area
  - Total: 128.81 km^{2} (49.73 sq mi)
  - Land: 123.84 km^{2} (47.81 sq mi)
  - Water: 4.97 km^{2} (1.92 sq mi)

Population (1 January 2026)
  - Total: 655
  - Density: 5.29/km^{2} (13.7/sq mi)

Gavieze Parish (Latvian: Gaviezes pagasts) is an administrative unit of South Kurzeme Municipality in the Courland region of Latvia. The parish has a population of 925 (as of 1/07/2010) and covers an area of 128.9 km^{2}.

== Villages of Gavieze parish ==
- Gavieze
- Gaviezes stacija
- Kradzes
- Mazgavieze
- Susta
- Vārtāja
