= Durbe Parish =

Parish in South Kurzeme Municipality, Latvia

- parish of Latvia
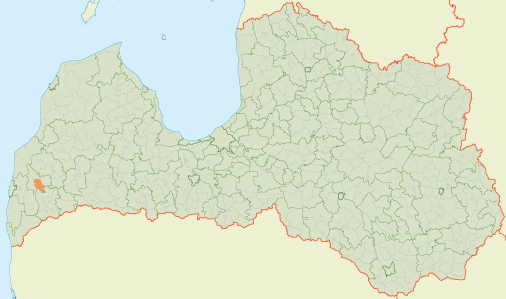
- 56°34′43″N 21°26′10″E
- Country: Latvia

Area
  - Total: 73.15 km^{2} (28.24 sq mi)
  - Land: 67.37 km^{2} (26.01 sq mi)
  - Water: 5.78 km^{2} (2.23 sq mi)

Population (1 January 2025)
  - Total: 368
  - Density: 5.46/km^{2} (14.1/sq mi)

Durbe Parish (Latvian: Durbes pagasts) is an administrative unit of South Kurzeme Municipality, Latvia. The parish has a population of 463 (as of 1/07/2010) and covers an area of 74 km^{2}. The administrative centre of the parish is the town of Durbe, although it is located outside the borders of the parish.

== Villages of Durbe Parish ==
- Krupmuiža
- Līguti
- Padones skola
- Prāmciems
- Raibāmuiža
