= Tadaiķi Parish =

Parish of Latvia

- parish of Latvia
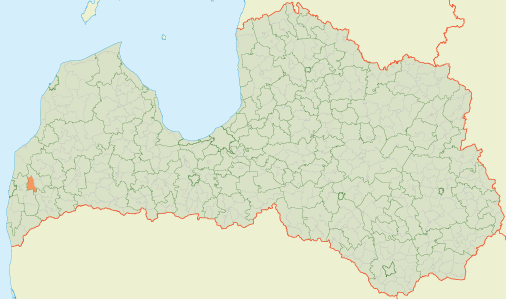
- 56°34′50″N 21°18′58″E
- Country: Latvia

Area
  - Total: 77.54 km^{2} (29.94 sq mi)
  - Land: 74.24 km^{2} (28.66 sq mi)
  - Water: 3.3 km^{2} (1.3 sq mi)

Population (1 January 2024)
  - Total: 733
  - Density: 9.5/km^{2} (24/sq mi)

Tadaiķi Parish (Latvian: Tadaiķu pagasts) is an administrative unit of South Kurzeme Municipality, Latvia. The parish has a population of 987 (as of 1/07/2010) and covers an area of 77.6 km^{2}.

== Villages of Tadaiķi parish ==
- Aistere
- Brenči
- Lieģi (Jaunlieģi)
- Šukteri
- Vārve
