= Bārta Parish =

Parish of Latvia

- parish of Latvia
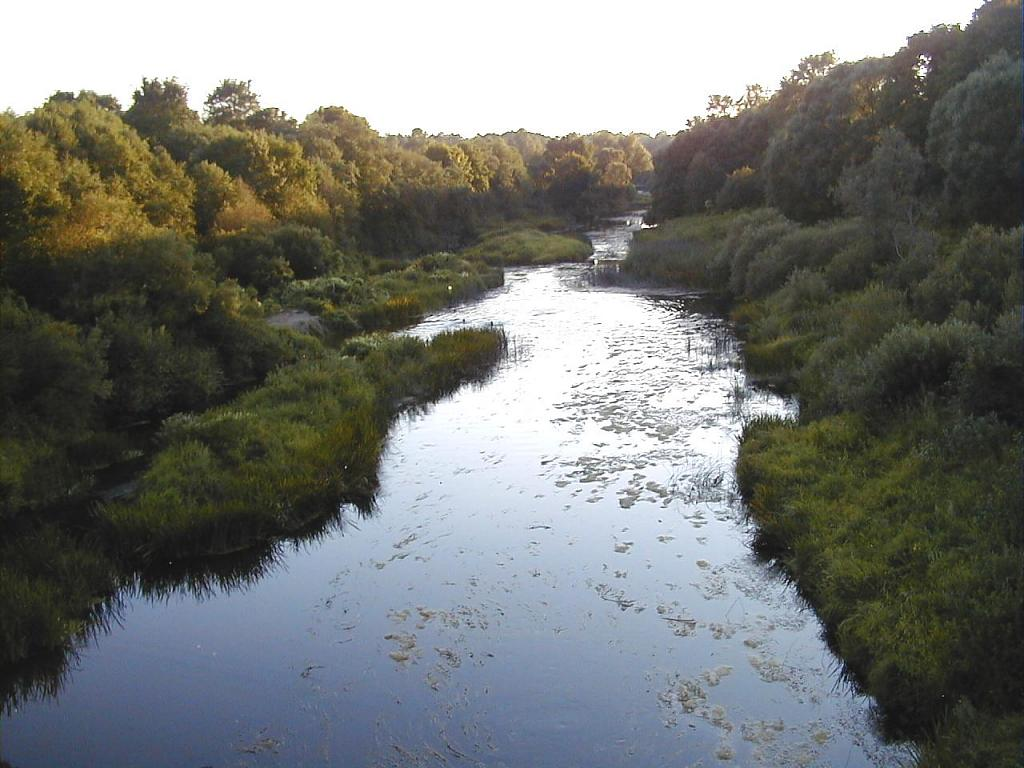

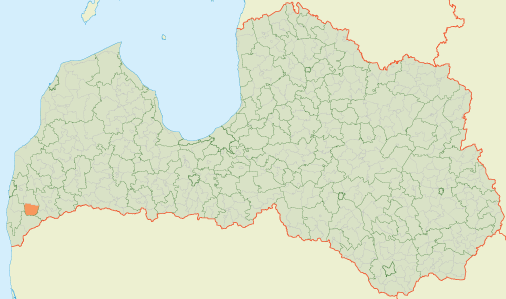
- 56°22′41″N 21°19′47″E
- Country: Latvia

Area
  - Total: 115.63 km^{2} (44.64 sq mi)
  - Land: 113.95 km^{2} (44.00 sq mi)
  - Water: 1.68 km^{2} (0.65 sq mi)

Population (1 January 2024)
  - Total: 518
  - Density: 4.5/km^{2} (12/sq mi)

Bārta Parish (Latvian: Bārtas pagasts) is an administrative unit of South Kurzeme Municipality in the Courland region of Latvia. The parish has a population of 683 (as of 1/07/2010) and covers an area of 115.6 km^{2}.

== Villages of Bārta parish ==
- Bārta
- Krūte
- Ķīburi
- Plosti
