= List of cities and towns in Georgia =

List of cities and towns in Georgia may refer to:

- List of cities and towns in Georgia (country)
- List of municipalities in Georgia (country)
- List of municipalities in Georgia (U.S. state)
