= Priekule Parish =

Parish of Latvia

- parish of Latvia
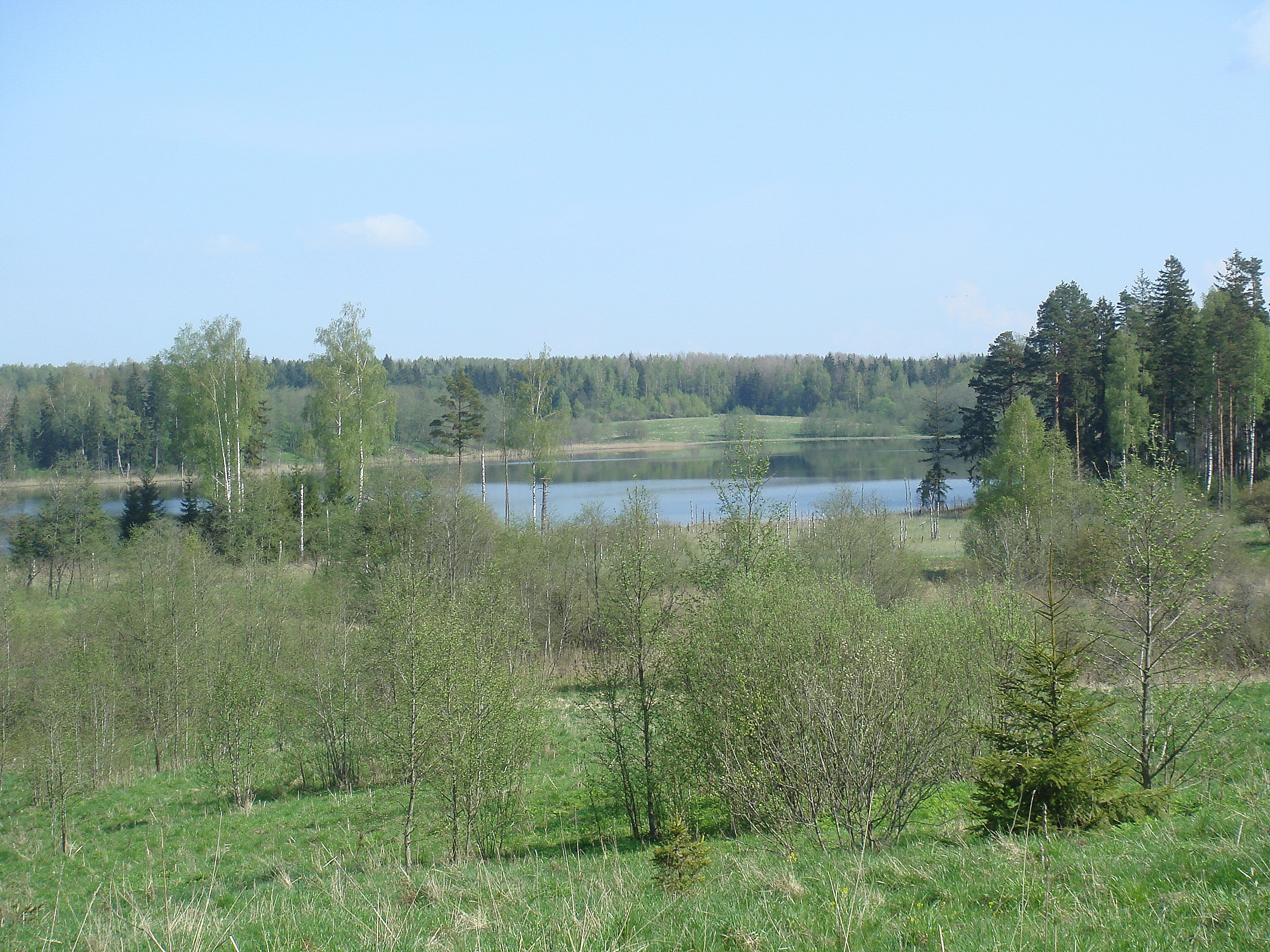
- Llac Reinu

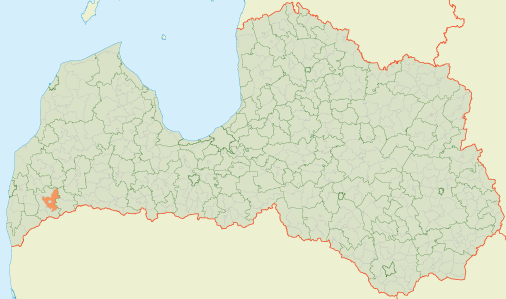
- Coordinates: 56°27′30″N 21°37′46″E
- Country: Latvia

Population (1 January 2026)
  - Total: 434
- Time zone: Eastern European Time
- Postal codes: LV-3434, LV-3486

Priekule Parish (Latvian: Priekules pagasts) is an administrative unit of South Kurzeme Municipality in the Courland region of Latvia. The parish has a population of 653 (as of 1/07/2013) and covers an area of 152.8 km^{2}.

== Villages of Priekule parish ==
- Asīte
- Audari
- Kalnenieki
- Kaņepji
- Knīveri
- Mazgramzda
- Saulaine
