= Priekule, Latvia =

Town in South Kurzeme Municipality, Latvia

Priekule
- Town
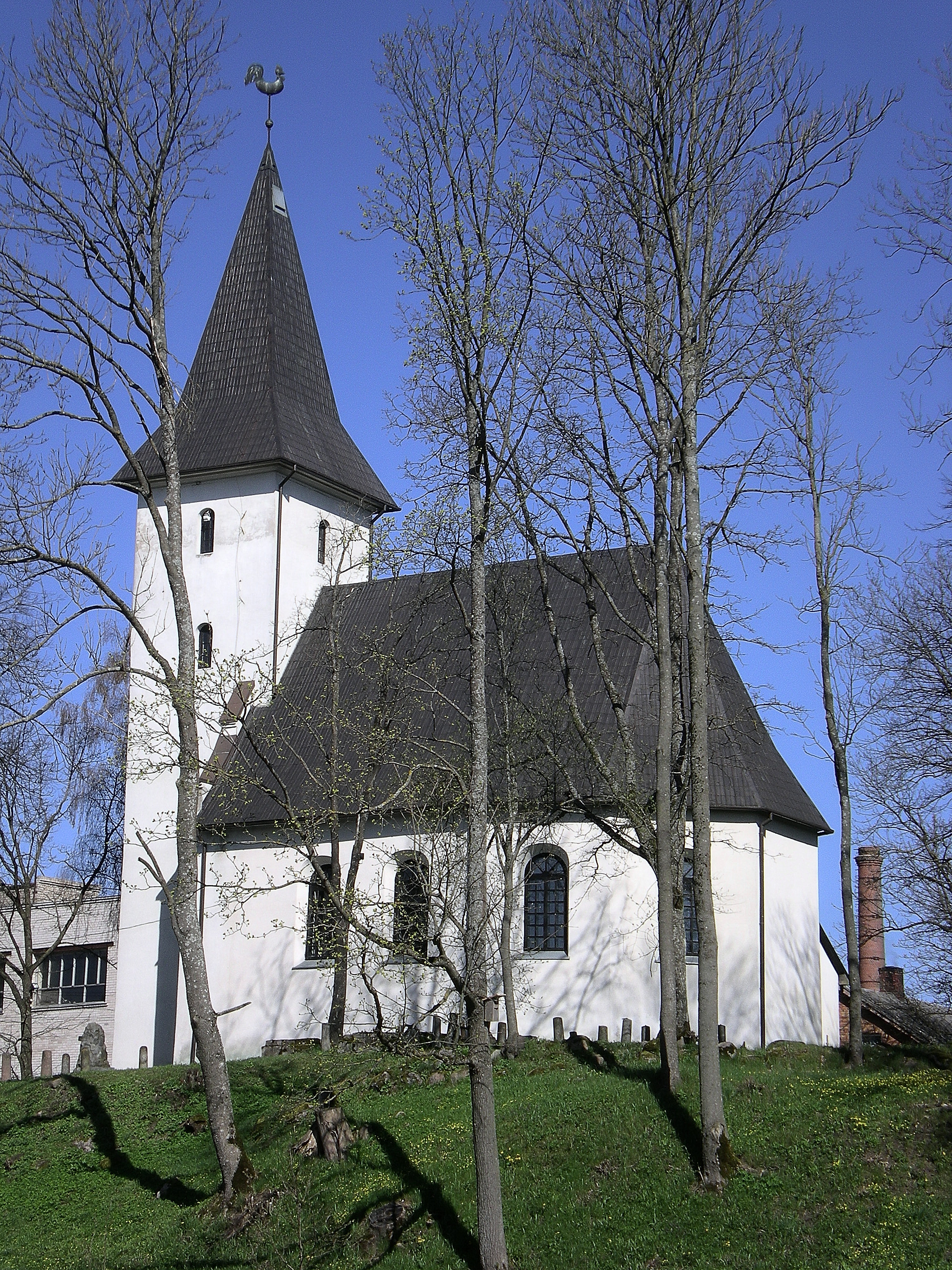
- Priekule church

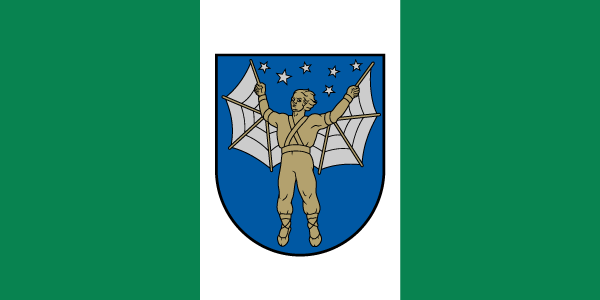
- Flag Coat of arms

- Location in Latvia
- Coordinates: 56°27′N 21°35′E
- Country: Latvia
- Municipality: South Kurzeme Municipality
- Town rights: 1928

Area
  - Total: 5.42 km^{2} (2.09 sq mi)
  - Land: 5.23 km^{2} (2.02 sq mi)
  - Water: 0.19 km^{2} (0.073 sq mi)

Population (2026)
  - Total: 1,786
  - Density: 341/km^{2} (884/sq mi)
- Time zone: UTC+2 (EET)
  - Summer (DST): UTC+3 (EEST)
- Postal code: LV-3434
- Calling code: +371 634
- Website: http://www.priekule.lv/

Priekule (German: Preekuln) is a town in the South Kurzeme Municipality in the Courland region of Latvia. The population was 1,872 in 2020.

== History ==
Priekule is first mentioned as a fortified manor in 1483. It only began to grow as a town after 1871 when the Liepāja–Vilnius Railway was built through Priekule. It was granted town rights in 1928 by the Latvian government.

Located approximately 2 km southwest of the town is the former Priekule Airfield. It was once used for agriculture aviation and now hosts motorsports events.

== See also ==
- List of cities in Latvia
