= South Kurzeme Municipality =

Municipality of Latvia

South Kurzeme Municipality Dienvidkurzemes novads
- Municipality
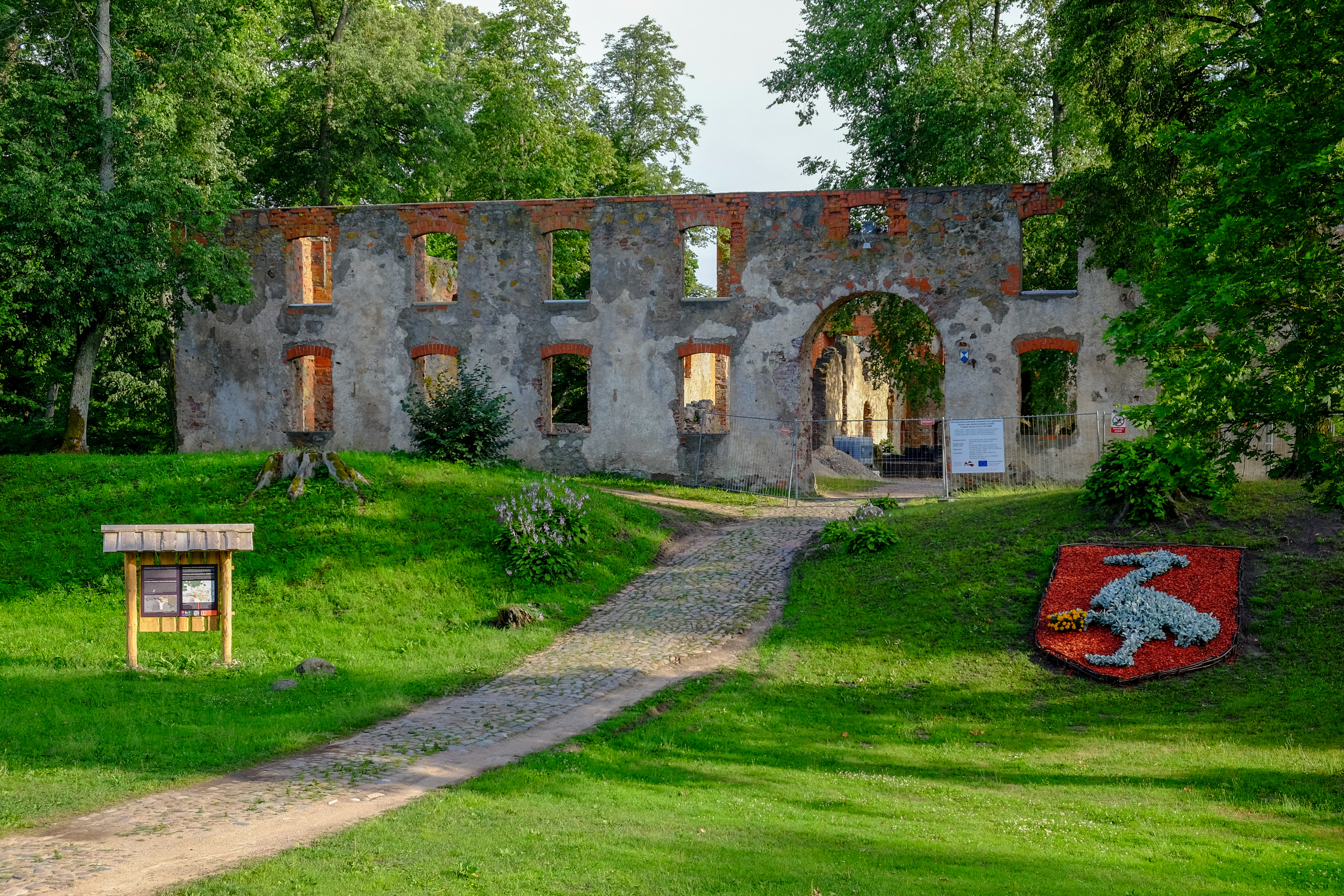
- Ruins of Grobiņa Castle in South Kurzeme Municipality

- Flag Coat of arms

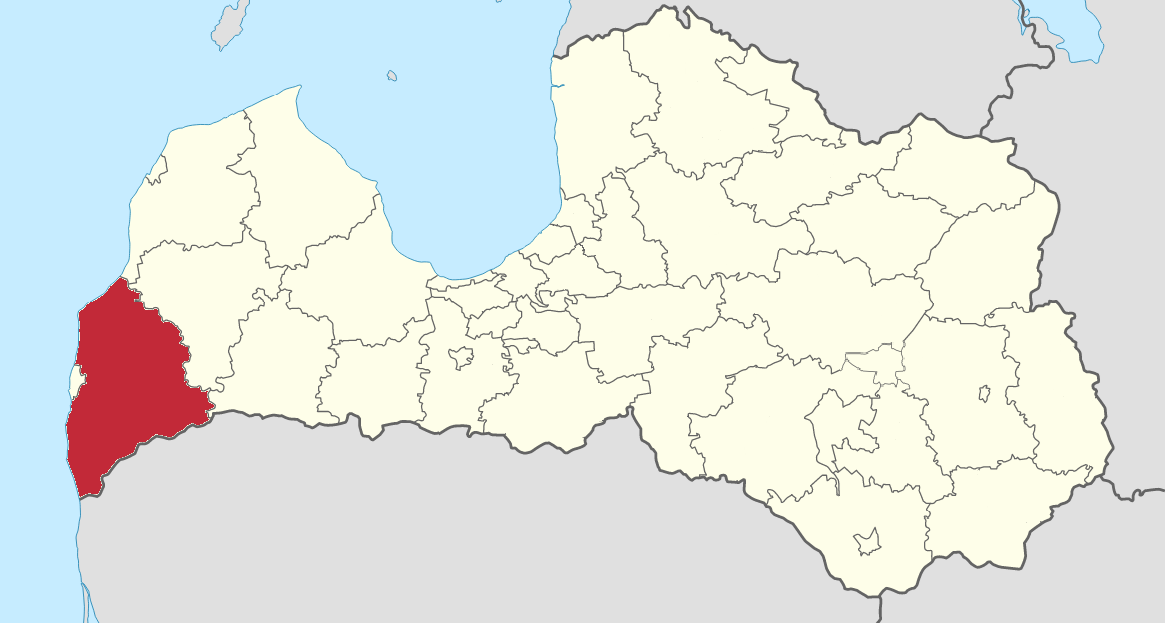
- Location of South Kurzeme Municipality in Latvia
- Coordinates: 56.55°N 21.15°E
- Country: Latvia
- Established: 1 July 2021
- Seat: Grobiņa

Government
  - Council Chair: Andris Jankovskis (NA)

Area
  - Total: 3,591 km^{2} (1,386 sq mi)
- Highest elevation (Krievukalns): 190 m (620 ft)

Population
  - Estimate (1 January 2021): 33,364
  - Seat: 3,522
- Time zone: UTC+2 (EET)
  - Summer (DST): UTC+3 (EEST)

South Kurzeme Municipality (Latvian: Dienvidkurzemes novads) is one of the 35 municipalities established in Latvia in 2021. It surrounds Liepāja, Latvia's third largest city. Its first elected municipal council took office on 1 July 2021. Its seat is at Grobiņa.

== Geography ==
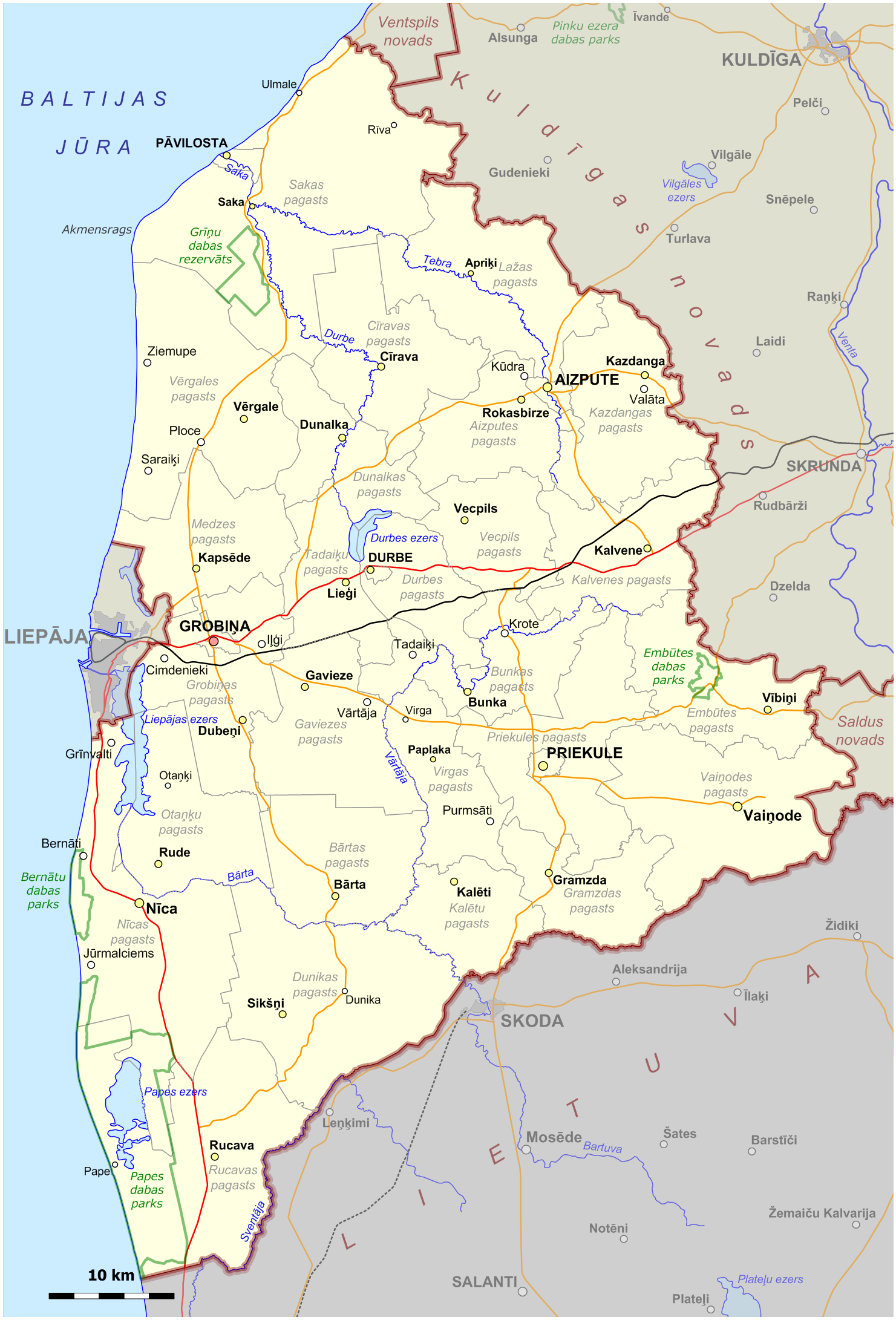
Map of South Kurzeme Municipality and its parishes.

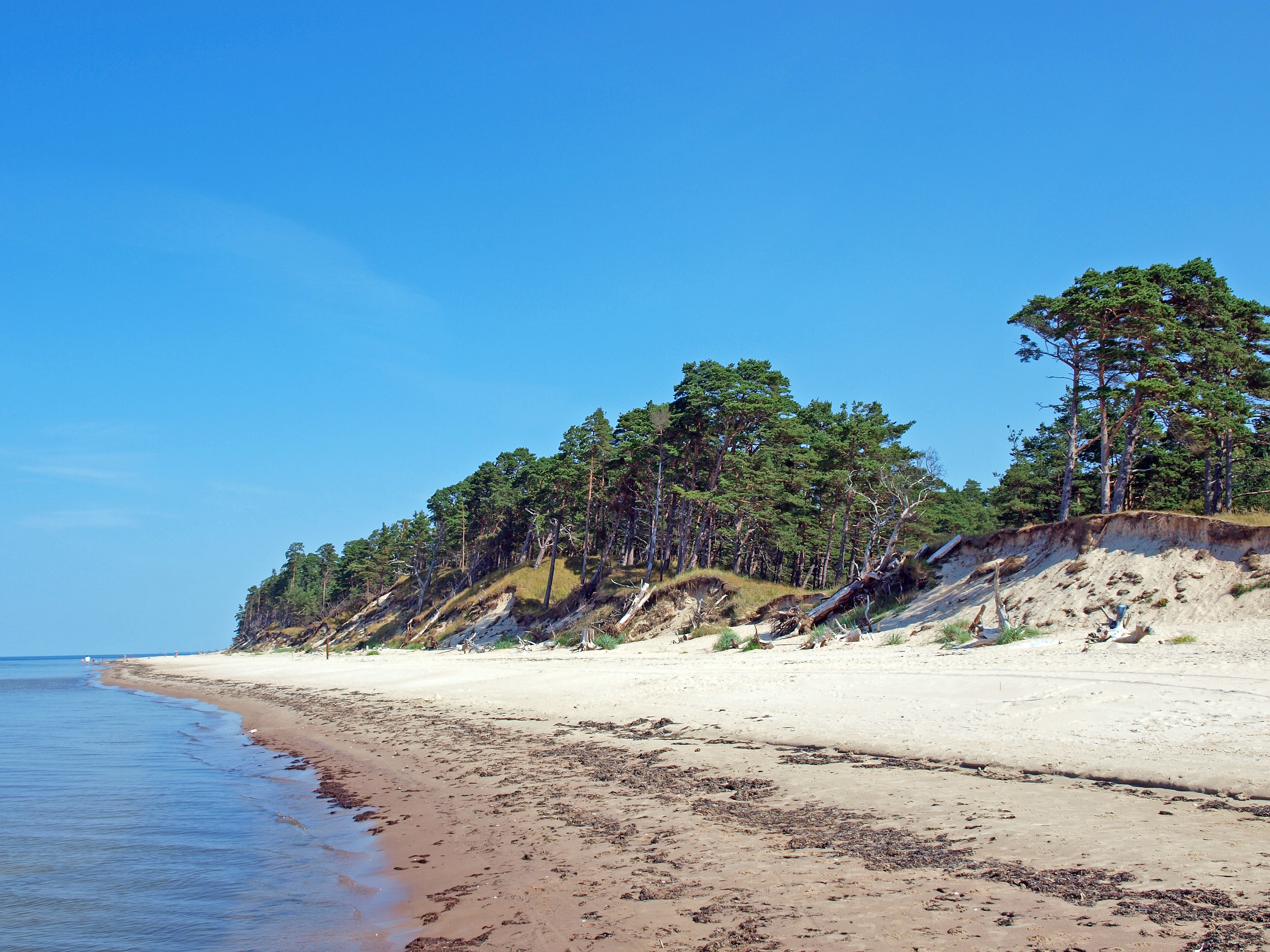
Beach and dunes at Cape Bernāti, Latvia's westernmost point.

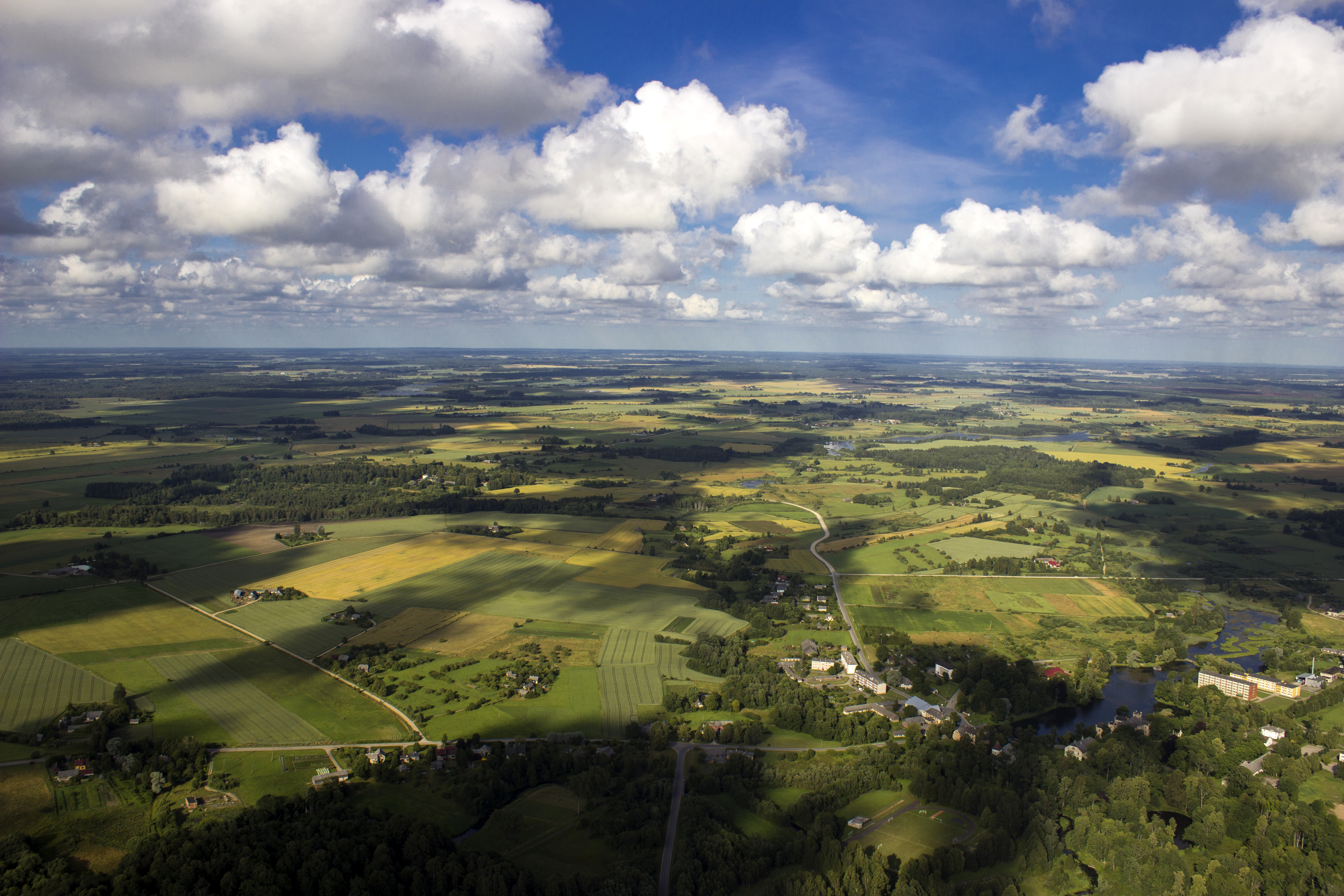
The countryside in Cīrava Parish.

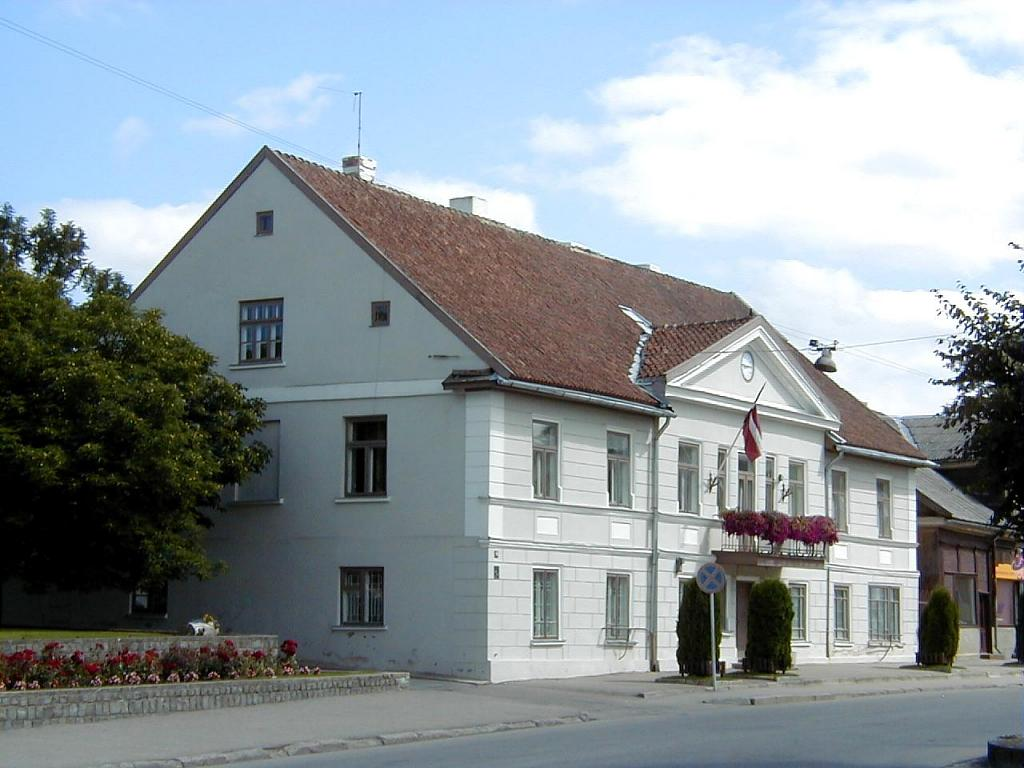
Former Aizpute town hall, now Aizpute Art School.

South Kurzeme is Latvia's largest municipality, covering an area of 3,591 square kilometres (1,386 sq mi). It is located in the southwestern part of the Courland region in western Latvia, on the coast of the Baltic Sea. It borders Ventspils Municipality to the north, Kuldīga Municipality to the northeast, and Saldus Municipality to the east. It surrounds the port city of Liepāja in the west. It also borders the Lithuanian counties of Klaipėda and Telšiai to the south and southeast respectively. The westernmost point of Latvia is located at Cape Bernāti in Nīca Parish south of Liepāja.

The coastline of South Kurzeme Municipality is over 100 kilometres (62 mi) long. Erosion of the coast north of Liepāja has been accelerated because breakwaters at Liepāja's seaport intercept sand drifting northward along the coast. The coast south of Liepāja features sandy beaches and dunes, behind which are lagoons and marshy plains. The largest of the lagoons are Lake Liepāja and Lake Tosmare on the municipality's border with Liepāja, and Lake Pape near the Lithuanian border. The Rietumkursa Upland rises east of the coastal lowlands, its highest point being Krievukalns at 190 metres (620 ft) in Embūte Parish.

Rivers in the municipality include the Bārta which flows from its headwaters in Lithuania into Lake Liepāja; and the Durbe and Tebra, which join to form the Saka at the village of the same name. The Saka drains into the Baltic Sea at Pāvilosta.

Pape Nature Reserve covers 10,853 hectares (26,820 acres) and protects Lake Pape and the surrounding land areas. It forms the terrestrial component of the Pape Wetland Complex Ramsar site, which also covers the adjacent marine area and has a total area of 51,725 hectares (127,820 acres). Bernāti Nature Park protects Cape Bernāti and Pūsēnu Hill, Latvia's highest sand dune at 37 metres (121 ft). Grīņu Nature Reserve is located in the northern part of the municipality.

== History ==
South Kurzeme Municipality corresponds in extent to the former Liepāja district as it existed from 1991 to 2009. In the 2009 territorial reforms, Liepāja district was divided into the municipalities of Aizpute, Durbe, Grobiņa, Nīca, Pāvilosta, Priekule, Rucava, and Vaiņode. In 2020, the Saeima approved reducing the number of administrative divisions at the municipal level from 119 to 42, including rejoining the aforementioned municipalities to form South Kurzeme Municipality. Elections for Latvia's new municipal councils were held on 5 June 2021, and the new municipalities including South Kurzeme will go into effect on 1 July 2021.

== Administration ==
The municipal council of South Kurzeme currently comprises 19 councillors. The municipality is to form joint authorities with the city of Liepāja for the administration of civil protection, education, and waste management.

The municipality is subdivided into five towns and 26 parishes:

Towns

- Aizpute
- Durbe
- Grobiņa
- Pāvilosta
- Priekule

Parishes

- Aizpute Parish
- Bārta Parish
- Bunka Parish
- Cīrava Parish
- Dunalka Parish
- Dunika Parish
- Durbe Parish
- Embūte Parish
- Gavieze Parish
- Gramzda Parish
- Grobiņa Parish
- Kalēti Parish
- Kalvene Parish
- Kazdanga Parish
- Laža Parish
- Medze Parish
- Nīca Parish
- Otaņķi Parish
- Priekule Parish
- Rucava Parish
- Saka Parish
- Tadaiķi Parish
- Vaiņode Parish
- Vecpils Parish
- Vērgale Parish
- Virga Parish

== Demographics ==
The Central Statistical Bureau of Latvia estimated a population of 33,364 living in what is now South Kurzeme Municipality at the beginning of 2021. This represented a 28% decrease from an estimated population of 46,451 at the beginning of 2000, and a 13% decrease from an estimated population of 38,351 at the beginning of 2011.

The municipal seat of Grobiņa had an estimated population of 3522 at the beginning of 2021. The largest town in the district is Aizpute, with an estimated population of 4036 at the beginning of 2021.

== Economy and infrastructure ==
Significant economic activities in South Kurzeme Municipality include tourism, agriculture, forestry and fishing. The municipality is served by national roads A9, which connects Liepāja to Riga, and A11, which runs from Liepāja to the Lithuanian border crossing near Rucava. The Jelgava–Liepāja Railway runs east to west through the municipality. Liepāja International Airport is located in South Kurzeme Municipality at Cimdenieki just east of Liepāja.

== Notable people ==
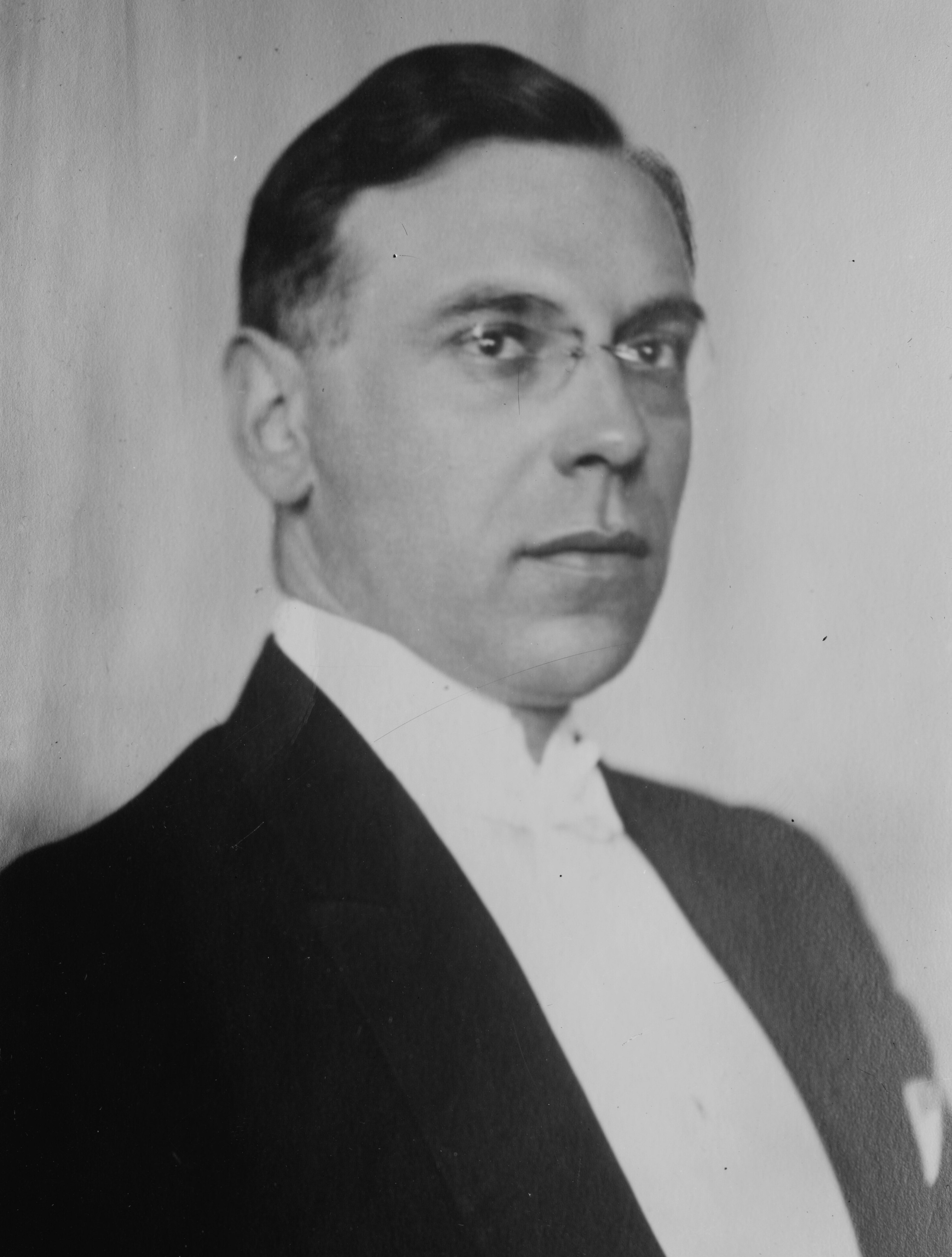
Z.A. Meirovics, 1900

- Eduard Schmidt von der Launitz (1797 in Grobiņa – 1869), a Baltic German sculptor.
- Atis Kronvalds (1837 in Bunka Parish – 1875), writer, linguist and pedagogue; member of the Young Latvia movement.
- Eduard von Keyserling (1855 in Tāšu-Padure – 1918), a Baltic German fiction writer and dramatist
- Fricis Roziņš (1870 in Purmsātu Parish – 1919), a Latvian Marxist revolutionary, publicist, and one of the founders of the Communist Party of Latvia.
- Zigfrīds Anna Meierovics (1887 in Durbe – 1925), politician, Prime Minister of Latvia, 1921 to 1923 and 1923 to 1924
- Kazys Bizauskas (1893 in Pāvilosta – 1941), Lithuanian statesman, diplomat, signatory for the Act of Independence of Lithuania.
- Jēkabs Nākums (born 1972 in Priekule), biathlete, competed at the 1998 and the 2002 Winter Olympics
- Ēriks Ešenvalds (born 1977 in Priekule), composer, mainly of choral music.
- Kaspars Petrovs (born 1978 in Grobiņa), a serial killer, convicted of the murder of thirteen elderly women
- Māris Jučers (born 1987 in Priekule), former ice hockey goaltender
- Madars Razma (born 1988 in Priekule), darts player, competes in PDC events. Nicknamed "Latvian Razmatazz"
- Artis Ate (born 1989 in Rucava) a Latvian basketball player
- Matīss Burģis (born 1989 in Priekule), table tennis player; competed at the 2012 Summer Olympics
