= Grīnvalti =

Village in Latvia

Coordinates: 56.4600°N 21.0069°E

Grīnvalti

Grīnvalti is a village in the Nīca Parish of South Kurzeme Municipality in the Courland region of Latvia. Grīnvalti is located on the narrow strip of the land between the Baltic Sea and Liepāja lake, near the southern border of Liepāja. Through it passes bus route Nr. 2092 (Liepāja-Nīca). Grīnvalti is mostly known because the 27th border guard battery was located nearby in the times of the Latvian SSR.

The population was 239 in 2026.
