= List of German exonyms for places in Latvia =

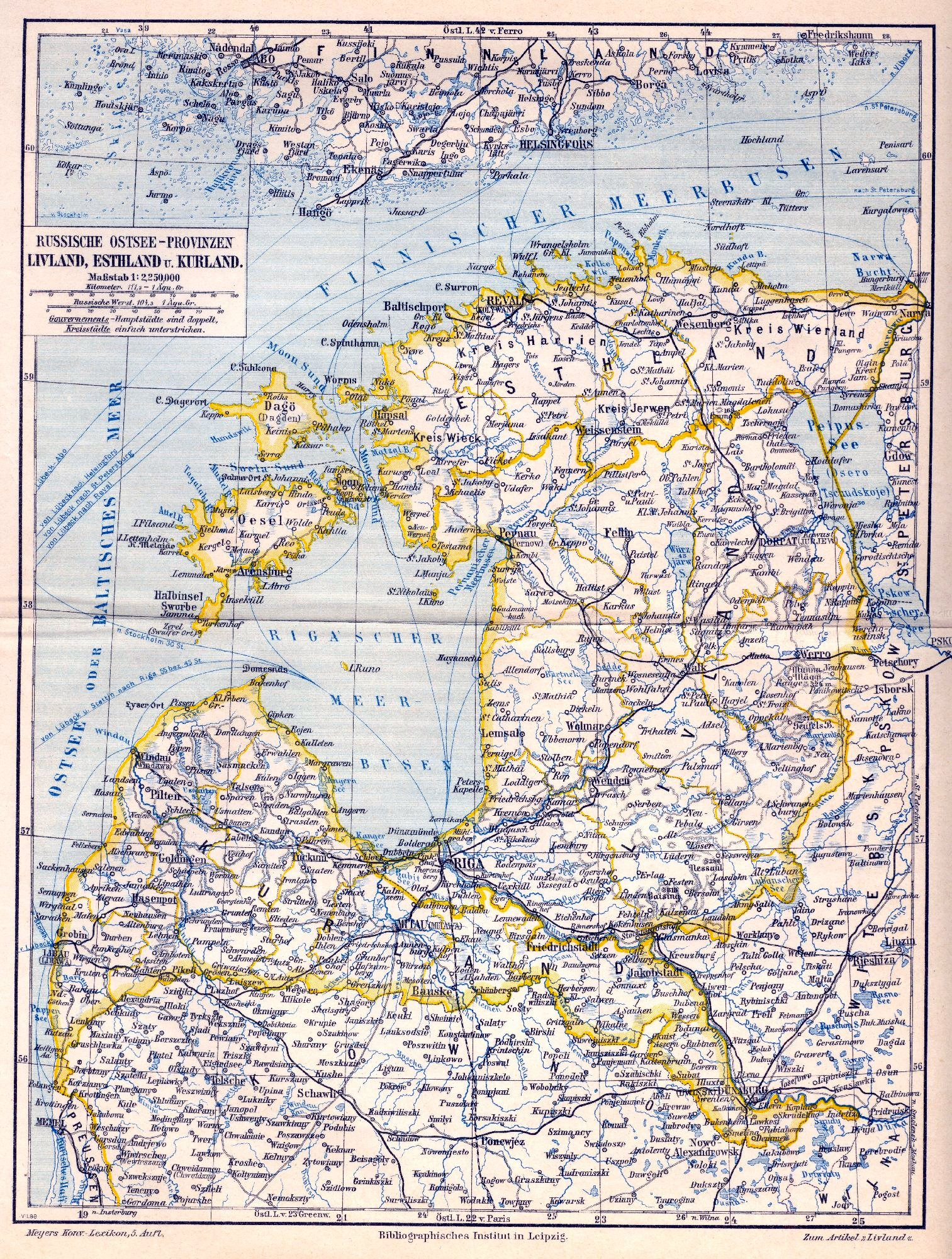
Map with German exonyms in Estonia and Latvia (Meyers Konversations-Lexikon, 1893-97)

This article contains a list of exonyms in German for geographical places in the current and previous territory of Latvia. A large part of the Latgale region of Latvia was included in the Polish–Lithuanian Commonwealth (1569-1772), later in the Vitebsk Guberniya of the Russian Empire (1804-1917), hence the common practice of transcribing Polish exonyms into German when no German exonym existed.

There were quite a number of shtetls in Latvia before World War II and the Holocaust, and so transcribed Yiddish exonyms in Latin letters of places in Latvia also exist.

Exonyms in this list were used in the first half of the 20th century and perhaps somewhat earlier. The spelling of the exonyms changes the further back in time they occur, since the German language changed considerably during the seven centuries of German presence in the Baltics.

== Complete list ==
Latvia Lettland
| Latvian place | German name | Notes |
|---|---|---|
| Ābeļi | Abelhof | |
| Abrene | Pytalowo | |
| Ādaži | Aahof, Neuermühlen | |
| Āgenskalns | Hagensberg | |
| Aglona | Aglohn | |
| Ainaži | Haynasch | |
| Aiviekste | Ewsthof | |
| Aizkraukle | Ascheraden | |
| Aizpute | Hasenpoth | |
| Aiztere | Aistern | |
| Aizupe | Asuppen | |
| Aizvīķi | Aiswicken | |
| Aknīste | Oknist | |
| Allaži | Allasch | |
| Aloja | Allendorf | |
| Alūksne | Marienburg | |
| Alsunge | Alschwangen | |
| Alsviķi | Alswig | |
| Ance | Anzen | |
| Andrupene | Andrepno | |
| Anna | Annenhof | |
| Annenieki | Annenhof | |
| Ape | Hoppenhof | |
| Apekalns | Oppekaln | |
| Apriķi | Appricken | |
| Āraiši | Arrasch | |
| Ārlava | Erwahlen | |
| Asari | Assern | |
| Asīte | Assieten | |
| Āsteres muiža | Poikern | |
| Asūne | Ossun | |
| Atašiene | Ataschan | |
| Auce | Autz | |
| Audere Asite | Bagge-Assieten | |
| Augšpils | Wyschgorodok | |
| Augstroze | Hochrosen | |
| Auleja | Aula | |
| Aumeistere | Serbigal | |
| Auri | Auermünde | |
| Babīte | Babbit | |
| Baģu Asīte | Firks-Assiten | |
| Baižkalns | Friedrichshof | |
| Baldone | Baldohn | |
| Balgale | Balgalln | |
| Baloži | Bonaventura, Rollbusch | |
| Baltāmuiža | Weißenhof | |
| Baltinava | Baltinowo | |
| Balvi | Bolwa | |
| Bārbele | Barbern | |
| Bārta | Bartau | |
| Basi | Bassen | |
| Bāte | Bahten | |
| Bauska | Bauske | |
| Bauņi | Bauenhof | |
| Bebrene | Bewern | |
| Bebri | Bewershof | |
| Beja | Beyenhof | |
| Beļava | Kortenhof | |
| Bēne | Behnen | |
| Bērstele | Groß-Bersteln | |
| Bērzaune | Bersohn | |
| Bērzgale | Bersgall | |
| Bērzmuiža | Bershof | |
| Bērzpils | Birsen | |
| Bikernieri | Bickern | |
| Biksti | Bixten | |
| Bilska | Bilskenhof | |
| Bīriņi | Koltzen | |
| Birkeneļi | Birkenhegen | |
| Birzgale | Birsgallen | |
| Birzi | Groß-Buschdorf | |
| Birži | Buschhof | |
| Bišumuiža | Bienenhof | |
| Blīdene | Blieden | |
| Blome | Blumenhof | |
| Bolderāja | Bulderaa | |
| Braslava | Breslau | |
| Brenguļi | Wrangelshof | |
| Brocēni | Berghof | |
| Brukņa | Brucken | |
| Bukmuiža | Buckmuische | |
| Buļļupe | Kurische Aa | |
| Bunka | Funkenhof | |
| Burtnieki | Burtneck | |
| Carnikava | Zarnikau | |
| Celmenieki | Zelmeneeken | |
| Ceraukste | Zerrauxt | |
| Cēre | Zehren | |
| Cēsis | Wenden | |
| Cesvaine | Sesswegen | |
| Cibla | Werestmuische | |
| Cīrava | Zirau | |
| Cirsti | Zirsten | |
| Code | Zahden | |
| Dagda | Dageten | |
| Dalbe | Dalbingen | |
| Daudzewa | Daudsewas | |
| Daugava | Düna | |
| Daugavgrīva | Dünamünde | |
| Daugavpils | Dünaburg | |
| Daugmale | Dünhof | |
| Dauguļi | Daugeln | |
| Dēmene | Demmen | |
| Devēna | Dewen | |
| Dikļi | Dickeln | |
| Dignāja | Dubena | |
| Dižilmāja | Groß-Ilmajen | |
| Dobele | Doblen | |
| Dole | Dahlen | |
| Drabeži | Drobbusch | |
| Drīceni | Drizane | |
| Drusti | Drostenhof | |
| Druviena | Druween | |
| Dubulti | Dubbeln | |
| Dunalke | Dubenalken | |
| Dundaga | Dondagen | |
| Dunika | Dunniken | |
| Dunte | Dunteshof, Ruthern | |
| Durbe | Durben | |
| Dūre | Duhrenhof | |
| Dviete | Dweeten | |
| Dzegužkalns | Kuckucksberg | |
| Dzelzava | Selsau | |
| Dzerbene | Serben | |
| Dzērve | Dserwen | |
| Dzintari | Edinburg | |
| Dzirciems | Selgerben | |
| Džūkste | Siuxt | |
| Ēdole | Edwahlen | |
| Ēģipte | Ägypten | |
| Eķengrāves muiža | Eckengraf, Eichengrabe | |
| Eleja | Elley | |
| Elkšņi | Ellern | |
| Embūte | Amboten | |
| Engure | Angern | |
| Erberge | Herbergen | |
| Ērģeme | Ermes | |
| Ērgļi | Erlaa | |
| Ēvele | Wolfahrt | |
| Ezere | Essern | |
| Gaigalava | Gaigalowa | |
| Gaiķi | Gaiken | |
| Galgauska | Golgowsky | |
| Garoze | Garosen | |
| Gārsene | Garssen | |
| Gatarta | Gotthardsburg | |
| Gauja | Livländische Aa | |
| Gaujiena | Adsel | |
| Gauri | Gawri | |
| Gavieze | Gawesen | |
| Gipka | Gipken | |
| Glūda | Pfalzgrafen | |
| Gostiņi | Trentelberg | |
| Gramzda | Gramsden | |
| Grenči | Grendsen | |
| Gridzgale | Grizgaln | |
| Grieze | Grösen | |
| Grivaisi | Griwaischen | |
| Grobiņa | Grobin | |
| Grostona | Grossdohn | |
| Grundzāle | Grundsahl | |
| Gudenieki | Gudeneecken | |
| Gulbene | Schwanenburg | |
| Idus | Idwen | |
| Iecava | Eckau | |
| Ievade | Ewahden | |
| Iģene | Iggen | |
| Ikšķile | Üxküll | |
| Iļģuciems | Ilgezeem | |
| Ilūkste | Illuxt | |
| Indra | Balbinowo | |
| Ilze | Ilsenburg | |
| Ilzene | Ilsen | |
| Inčukalns | Hinzenberg | |
| Ipiķi | Ippik | |
| Irbe | Irben | |
| Irlava | Irlau | |
| Irši | Hirschenhof | |
| Islīca | Islitz | |
| Ivande | Iwanden | |
| Izvalta | Uschwalde | |
| Jāsmuiža | Jasch-Mysa | |
| Jaunburtnieki | Sternhof | |
| Jaunjelgava | Friedrichstadt | |
| Jaunlaicene | Neu-Laitzen | |
| Jaunlikupeni | Neu-Likoppen | |
| Jaunpiebalg | Neu-Pebalg | |
| Jaunpils | Neuenburg | |
| Jaunrauna | Ronneburg-Neuhof | |
| Jaunsaule | Neu-Rahden | |
| Jaunsvirlauka | Neu-Bergfried | |
| Jaunvāle | Neu-Sackenhof | |
| Jēkabpils | Jakobstadt | |
| Jelgava | Mitau | |
| Jercēni | Neu-Wolfahrt | |
| Jeŗi | Seyershof | |
| Jumprava | Jungfernhof | |
| Jumurda | Jummerdehn | |
| Jūrkalne | Felixberg | |
| Jūrmala | Riga-Strand | |
| Kabile | Kabillen | |
| Kaceni | Katschanowo | |
| Kaijciems | Sarum | |
| Kaldabruņa | Kaltenbrunn | |
| Kalēti | Kalleten | |
| Kalncempji | Kalnemoise | |
| Kalnciems | Kalnzeem | |
| Kalsnava | Kalzenau | |
| Kalupe | Kolup | |
| Kalvene | Kalwen | |
| Kandava | Kandau | |
| Kapiņi | Kapin | |
| Kaplava | Born, Koplau | |
| Kārķi | Karkell | |
| Kārļi | Karlsruhe | |
| Kārsava | Karsau, Korsowka | |
| Kārzdaba | Kerstenbehm | |
| Kastrāne | Kastran | |
| Katrinas | Sankt Katharinen | |
| Katvari | Kadfer | |
| Kauguri | Kaugershof | |
| Kaunata | Kownat | |
| Kazdanga | Katzdangen | |
| Ķēči | Fossenberg | |
| Ķegums | Keggum | |
| Ķeipene | Kaipen | |
| Ķekava | Keckau | |
| Ķemeri | Kemmern | |
| Ķempēnu | Kempenhof | |
| Ķerkliņi | Kerklingen | |
| Ķieģeļi | Kegeln | |
| Ķipēnu | Eck | |
| Klostere | Kloster-Hasenpoth | |
| Kokmuiža | Kokenhof | |
| Koknese | Kokenhusen | |
| Kolkā | Kolken | |
| Ķoņi | Königshof | |
| Korva | Korwenhof | |
| Kosa | Kosenhof | |
| Krape | Kroppenhof | |
| Krāslava | Kraslau | |
| Kraukļi | Gravendahl | |
| Krimulda | Kremon | |
| Krote | Krothen | |
| Krustpils | Kreuzburg | |
| Krūte | Kruthen | |
| Kūdums | Kudum | |
| Kuldīga | Goldingen | |
| Kurcuma | Kurzum | |
| Kurmāle | Kurmahlen | |
| Kurmene | Kurmen | |
| Kursīši | Kursiten | |
| Kurzeme | Kurland | |
| Kusa | Kussen | |
| Lade | Ladenhof | |
| Laidze | Laidsen | |
| Lambarte | Lambertshof | |
| Landze | Landsen | |
| Laši | Lassen | |
| Latgale | Lettgallen | |
| Laubere | Laubern | |
| Laucese | Kalkuhnen | |
| Ļaudona | Laudohn | |
| Launkalne | Horstenhof | |
| Lazdona | Lasdohn | |
| Lēdurga | Loddiger | |
| Lejasciems | Aahof | |
| Lenči | Lenzenhof | |
| Lestene | Lesten | |
| Lībagi | Lipsthusen | |
| Lielcecere | Groß-Zezern | |
| Lielivande | Edsen, Groß-Iwanden | |
| Lielupe | Kurländische Aa | |
| Lielvārde | Lennewarden | |
| Liepa | Lindenhof | |
| Liepāja | Libau | |
| Liepkalne | Linden | |
| Liepmuiža | Linde | |
| Liepna | Lipna | |
| Liepupe | Pernigel | |
| Liezere | Lösern | |
| Līgatne | Ligat | |
| Līksna | Lixna | |
| Limbaži | Lemsal | |
| Linava | Talkowa | |
| Lipaiķi | Lippaiken | |
| Litene | Lettin | |
| Līvāni | Li(e)venhof | |
| Līvbērze | Lieven-Bersen | |
| Lizums | Lysohn | |
| Lode | Lohdenhof | |
| Lode | Metzküll | |
| Lubāna | Lubahn | |
| Lubeja | Lubey | |
| Lubezere | Lub-Essern | |
| Ludza | Ludsen | |
| Lugaži | Luhde | |
| Lutriņi | Luttringen | |
| Madliena | Sissegal | |
| Madona | Modohn | |
| Majori | Majorenhof | |
| Mālpils | Lemburg | |
| Malta | Antonopol | |
| Malupe | Malup | |
| Mārciena | Martzen | |
| Mārkalne | Fianden | |
| Mārsnēņi | Marzenhof | |
| Matīši | Sankt Matthiae | |
| Matkule | Mattkuln | |
| Mazsalaca | Salisburg | |
| Medze | Medsen | |
| Mēdzūla | Meselau | |
| Meirāni | Meiran | |
| Mēmele | Memelhof | |
| Meņģele | Altenwoga | |
| Mērdzene | Michalow | |
| Mēris | Mehrhof | |
| Mērsrags | Markgrafen | |
| Mētriena | Odsen | |
| Mežaparks | Kaiserwald | |
| Mežmuiža | Grenzhof | |
| Mežotne | Mesohten | |
| Milzkalne | Schlokenbeck | |
| Misa | Misse | |
| More | Moritzberg | |
| Muižciems | Muischazeem | |
| Muižkalni | Maikendorf | |
| Mujāni | Mojahn | |
| Nabe | Nabben | |
| Naudīte | Nauditen | |
| Naukšēni | Naukschen | |
| Nereta | Nerft | |
| Nīca | Niederbartau | |
| Nīkrāce | Niekratzen | |
| Nīgranda | Nigranden | |
| Nirza | Nersa | |
| Nītaure | Nitau | |
| Nogale | Nogallen | |
| Nordeķi | Nordeck | |
| Nurmuiža | Nurmhusen | |
| Ogre | Ohger | |
| Olaine | Olain | |
| Oļi | Ohlenhof | |
| Omuļi | Homeln | |
| Ozolaine | Osolshof | |
| Ozoļi | Lappier | |
| Ozolniek | Paulsgnade | |
| Pabaži | Pabbasch | |
| Padure | Paddern | |
| Pāle | Sepkull | |
| Palsmane | Palzmar | |
| Pampaļi | Pampeln | |
| Panemune | Ponemun | |
| Pasiene | Possinja | |
| Pastende | Postenden | |
| Patkule | Patkul | |
| Pāvilosta | Paulshafen | |
| Pededze | Charlottenburg | |
| Penkule | Pankelhof | |
| Pērkone | Perkuhnenhof | |
| Pēternieki | Peterhof | |
| Pēterupe | Sankt Peters-Kapelle | |
| Pilda | Pylda | |
| Pilskalne | Schloßberg | |
| Piltene | Pilten | |
| Piņķi | Pinkenhof | |
| Plāņi | Planhof | |
| Planica | Planetzen | |
| Platone | Neu-Platon | |
| Pļaviņas | Stockmannshof | |
| Pociems | Posendorf | |
| Poderaa | Podrags | |
| Pope | Popen | |
| Prauliena | Praulen | |
| Praviņi | Prawingen | |
| Preiļi | Prely | |
| Priekule | Preekuln | |
| Priekuļi | Freudenberg | |
| Prode | Prohden | |
| Puikule | Puikeln | |
| Pūre | Puhren | |
| Purmsāti | Pormsahten | |
| Purvmale | Bakowo | |
| Pustiņa | Pustin | |
| Puza | Pussen | |
| Ranka | Ramkau | |
| Ranķi | Ranken | |
| Rauda | Rautensee | |
| Rauna | Ronneburg | |
| Rauza | Rausenhof | |
| Rāva | Rawen | |
| Rāvlica | Rawlilz | |
| Remte | Remten | |
| Rencēni | Ranzen | |
| Renda | Rönnen | |
| Rēzekne | Rjeschiza, Rositten | |
| Rinda | Angermünde | |
| Rite | Ringen | |
| Ropaži | Rodenpois | |
| Roperbeķi | Roperbeck | |
| Rozēni | Koddiak | |
| Rozbeķi | Rosenbeck | |
| Rozula | Rosenbeck | |
| Ruba | Ringen | Formerly Reņģe in Latvian |
| Rubene | Papendorf | |
| Rubene | Rubinen | |
| Rucava | Rutzau | |
| Rudbārži | Rudbahren | |
| Rudzēti | Rudsaty | |
| Rugāji | Rugoi | |
| Rūjiena | Rujen | |
| Rundāle | Ruhenthal | |
| Rundāni | Rundany | |
| Ružina | Ruschon | |
| Sabile | Zabeln | |
| Saigale | Sallgaln | |
| Saikava | Friedrichswald | |
| Saka | Sackenhausen | |
| Sakstagals | Saktygal | |
| Sala | Holmhof | |
| Salaca | Salis | |
| Salacgrīva | Salismünde | |
| Salaspils | Kirchholm | |
| Saldus | Frauenburg | |
| Saliena | Salenen | |
| Saliena | Sallensee | |
| Sarkaņi | Heydenfeld | |
| Sāti | Sahten | |
| Sātini | Sahtingen | |
| Sauka | Saucke | |
| Sauļi | Saulhof | |
| Saulkrasti | Neubad | |
| Sausneja | Saussen | |
| Sece | Setzen | |
| Seda | Sedde | |
| Sēja | Zögenhof | |
| Sēļi | Sehlen | |
| Sēlpils | Selburg | |
| Sēme | Sehmen | |
| Sērene | Sehren | |
| Sērmūkši | Sermus | |
| Sesava | Sessau | |
| Sieksate | Sexaten | |
| Sigulda | Segewold | |
| Sīķele | Sieklen | |
| Silajāņi | Solujeny | |
| Sinole | Sinohlen | |
| Sīpele | Ziepelhof | |
| Šķaune | Landskron | |
| Šķēde | Scheden | |
| Šķibe | Alexandershof | |
| Šķilbeni | Schkilbany | |
| Slampe | Schlampen | |
| Sloka | Schlok | |
| Skaista | Isabellin | |
| Skaistkalne | Schönberg | |
| Skrīveri | Römershof | |
| Skrudaliene | Skrudalina | |
| Skrunda | Schrunden | |
| Skujene | Schujen | |
| Skulte | Adiamünde | |
| Slāte | Schlottenhof | |
| Smārde | Schmarden | |
| Smiltene | Smilten | |
| Snēpele | Schnepeln | |
| Snikere | Schnickern | |
| Spāre | Spahren(hof) | |
| Staicele | Staizel | |
| Stalbe | Stolben | |
| Stāmeriena | Stomersee | |
| Stelpe | Stelpenhof | |
| Stende | Stenden | |
| Stiene | Ulpisch | |
| Stirniene | Stirnian | |
| Straupe | Roop | |
| Strazde | Strasden | |
| Strenči | Stackeln | |
| Striķu | Stricken | |
| Strutele | Strutteln | |
| Stūri | Sturhof | |
| Subate | Subbath | |
| Sunākste | Sonnaxt | |
| Suntaži | Sunzel | |
| Susēja | Sussey | |
| Svente | Swenten | |
| Svētciems | Neu-Salis | |
| Svītene | Schwitten | |
| Tadaiki | Tadeiken | |
| Talsi | Talsen | |
| Tāši | Telsen | |
| Taurkalns | Tauerkaln | |
| Taurupe | Taurup | |
| Tērvete | Hofzumberge, Terwete | |
| Tetele | Tetelmünde | |
| Tiegaži | Tegasch | |
| Tilza | Kokorow | |
| Tirza | Tirsen | |
| Tome | Thomsdorf | |
| Torņakalns | Thorensberg | |
| Toce | Tootzen | |
| Tolka | Tolkenhof | |
| Trapene | Treppenhof | |
| Trikāta | Trikaten | |
| Troška | Espenhöhe | |
| Tuja | Taubenhof | |
| Tukums | Tuckum | |
| Tume | Tummen | |
| Turaida | Tureiden | |
| Turlava | Turlau | |
| Ugāle | Ugahlen | |
| Ukŗi | Kuckern | |
| Ulmale | Ullmahlen | |
| Umurga | Ubbenorm | |
| Ungurmuiža | Lehmenen, Limenen | |
| Upesgrīva | Uppegriwe | |
| Usma | Usmaiten | |
| Užava | Hasau | |
| Vadakste | Waddax | |
| Vaidava | Waidau | |
| Vainiži | Wainsel | |
| Vaiņode | Wainoden | |
| Valdemārpils | Sassmacken | formerly Sasmaka in Latvian |
| Valgale | Wallgahlen | |
| Valgunde | Wolgund | |
| Valka | Walk | |
| Valle | Wallhof | |
| Valmiera | Wolmar | |
| Valtaiķi | Neuhausen | |
| Vandzene | Wandsen | |
| Vane | Wahnen | |
| Vangaži | Wangasch | |
| Varakļāni | Warkland | |
| Vārkava | Varkau | |
| Vārme | Wormen | |
| Vārnava | Wahrenbrock | |
| Vārve | Warwen | |
| Vecjerceni | Wohlfahrt | |
| Veclikupeni | Lihkuppen | |
| Vecmuiža | Neugut | |
| Vecpils | Altenburg | |
| Vecslababa | Staraja Sloboda | |
| Vecsvirlauka | Alt-Bergfried | |
| Vējava | Fehgen | |
| Velena | Wellan | |
| Veļķi | Hohenbergen | |
| Venta | Windau | |
| Ventspils | Windau | |
| Vērgali | Virginahlen | |
| Veseleva | Wesselhof | |
| Vesterots | Westerotten | |
| Vestiene | Festen | |
| Vidriži | Widdrisch | |
| Vidsmuiža | Galen | |
| Vidzeme | Livland | |
| Viesīte | Eckengraf | |
| Vietalva | Fehteln | |
| Vijciems | Wiezenhof | |
| Viļaka | Marienhausen | |
| Viļāni | Welonen | |
| Vilce | Wilzen | |
| Vilceni | Wilsenhof | |
| Vildoga | Nurmis | |
| Viļeni | Wilon | |
| Vilkumiests | Egipten | |
| Vīrane | Wirroniz | |
| Virbi | Wirben | |
| Vircava | Würzau | |
| Virga | Wirgen | |
| Viskaļi | Ramdan | |
| Višķi | Wyschki | |
| Vitrupe | Witterbeck | |
| Zaļenieki | Grünhof | |
| Zālīte | Grünewalde | |
| Zalve | Salwen | |
| Zante | Santen | |
| Zasa | Weessen, Weessen, Wehsen, Wiessen | |
| Zaube | Jürgensburg | |
| Zebrene | Rengenhof | |
| Zeltiņi | Seltinghof | |
| Zemgale | Semgallen | |
| Zemīte | Samiten | |
| Zentene | Senten | |
| Ziemeris | Semershof | |
| Ziemupe | Seemuppen | |
| Zilupe | Rosenau | |
| Ziŗa | Sirgen | |
| Zlēkas | Schleck | |
| Zūras | Suhrs | |
| Zvārde | Schwarden | |
| Zvārtava | Schwarzhof | |
| Zvirgzdene | Swirsdino | |

== See also ==
- German exonyms
- Latvian-German and German-Latvian exonyms
