= Battle of Skuodas =

Battle of Skuodas may refer to:

- Battle of Skuodas (1259), 13th-century Samogitian victory over the Livonian Order
- Battle of Skuodas (1658), a 17th-century battle during the Deluge between Swedish and Lithuanian forces
