= Līva =

River in Latvia

Līva Lyva
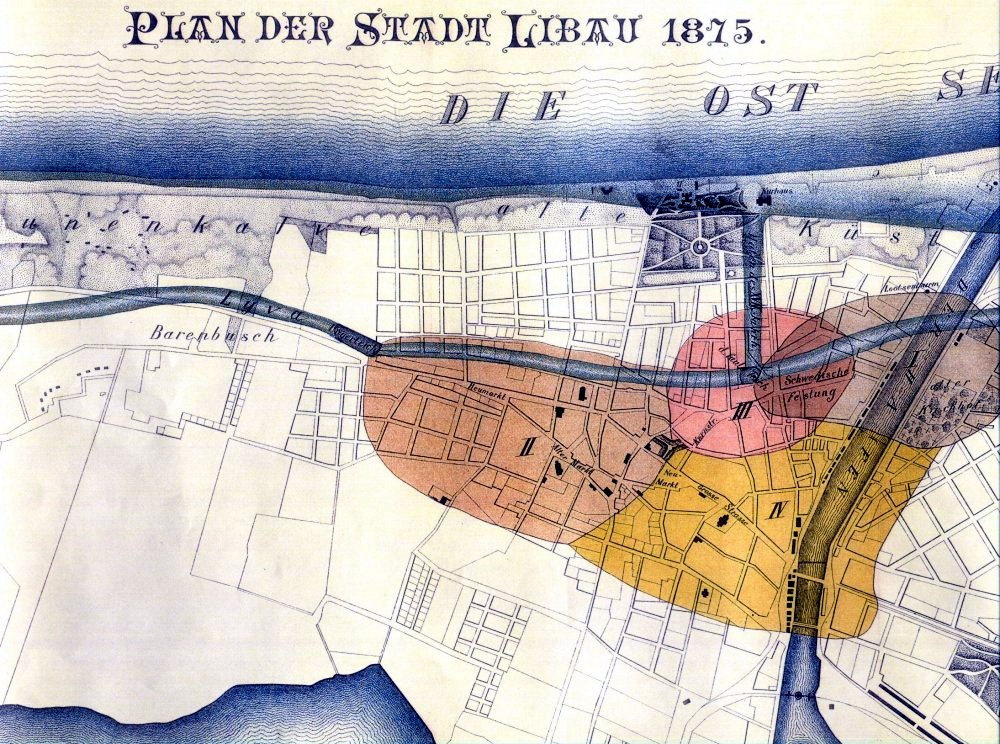
- Probable place where Līva was located
- Nickname: Liv

Location
- Country: Latvia
- District: Liepāja

Physical characteristics
- Source: Liepāja Lake
  - coordinates: 56.483°N 21.0167°E
- Mouth: Baltic Sea
  - coordinates: 56.5167°N 20.9833°E

Līva (German: Lyva, Lyua, Libau) was a famous river in Kurzeme in today's Latvia. It was located between the Baltic Sea and Liepāja Lake and had a length of about 6 kilometres and a width near the mouth of about 50 metres. The source of the Līva was located in Liepāja Lake near the former Pērkone river. The place where the Līva fell into the Baltic Sea was located approximately at the site of today's northern harbour in Liepāja. The river had one known island, Perkunen (Latvian: Pērkona galva); it was located near the source of the river. The Līva served as a water trade way to Grobiņa via the Liepāja lake and the port was located on it. The original suburb with a name Līva was located about 1 kilometre from the mouth of the river on both sides of it. The old name for the city Liepāja descends from the name of the river and for the centuries was associated with it. The part of the river near the mouth had become too shallow by the end of the 15th century. In the 16th century, the first Līva channel was dug up between Līva and Baltic Sea with a length of about 780 metres and a width of 50 metres. In 1697–1703, the new Trade channel was dug up and few years later the river was filled up.

== Etymology ==
The German name Lyva (Latvian: Līva) derived from Livonian language liiv – sand. The other sources offer alternative etymology for the name, Liva is the old name of Liepāja Lake or a derivative from the Mari language lya (lyva) – sand shore, sand spit.

== History ==
The territory of the present day Latvia was cleared from the ice in about 8000 BC, in the same period the river was formed. The territory near the river, on the present territory of Liepāja was populated by the Baltic-Slavic Venedi tribes (West-Baltic barrow culture) from the 1st millennium BC. Līva was not mentioned by the Ptolemy among the rivers of Latvia known to Romans – Rudon, Turuntes and Chesinos. Later, after the 5th century the territory near the Liepāja Lake was inhabited by the Curonians (Letts) and was Danish colony. The first known source mentioning people visited neighborhood of the river are found in Rimbert's Vita Ansgari when the Olof (I) of Sweden begin a war with the Curonians in 856 AD, after the war the territory come to the control of Swedes. The name Līva for the first time was mentioned in 1263. In 1424 year the river was described by the French knight Guillebert de Lannoy. In 1581 Prussian land surveyor Athier Wrenfoldt drew up the first map where the river Līva was shown.

== Descriptions ==
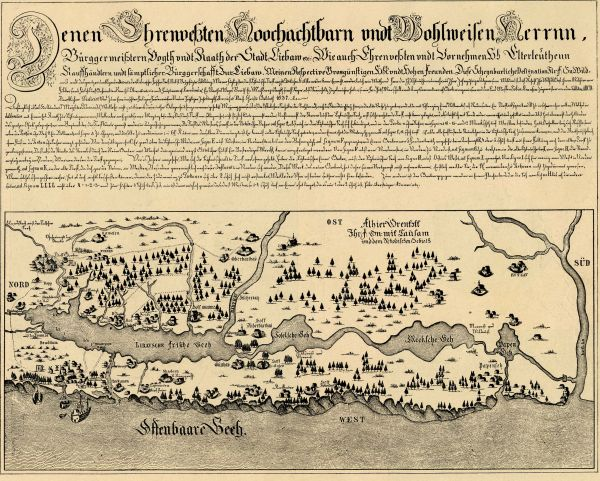
Map of the Libau region, created by the Prussian surveyor Athier Wrenfolss in the year 1581 where Līva is shown

The earliest known written document mentioned name Līva in 1263, in which was prohibited to build dams on the river. Līva was also mentioned in the documents about lending of the territory of the Perkunen island by the Courland bishop Otto to Vedig fon Sacken in 1384, where the river was named spring. Some historical documents about earlier period of the Līva river and the city Liepāja are found in Lehnbriefs acts, written in Latin language and are available from the Marburg Herder Institute, mostly in the Bauer's German translation of the 16th century and are stored in Geheime Staatsarchiv Preußischer Kulturbesitz managed by the Prussian Cultural Heritage Foundation.

== Misinterpretations ==
For a long time the name Līva was incorrectly associated with the northern sleeve of the delta of the river Bārta between the Liepāja Lake and the Baltic Sea. It was mentioned several times by different travelers and historians of the Medieval Ages, especially by Eberhard von Zeine, Burkhard von Hornhausen and Guillebert de Lannoy in 1423–1424. The other incorrect opinion was, that the Amber Route passed near the river, it probably passed near the river Bārta.

== Today remains ==
At the site of the former watercourse near the Dienvidrietumu rajon in Liepāja in the 20th century was dug up a pond similar to the mouthpiece. In the port of Liepāja are located two memorial stones marking the former bed of the river. On the place of the former channel of Līva in the 19th century was built a swan pond with a rotunda on the small island (Russian: Лебединка), the most famous tourist location in Liepaja. Also a Līvu beer is produced.

== Other rivers with the similar names ==
- Liwa is a river in Poland. Its source is located in the Gaudy Lake near the city Kaminiec, it flow through Liwieniec Lake near Prabuty in Poland and fall into river Nogat.
- Liva is a river in the Murmansk Region of Russia, the source is located in the Kolka region, flows through Livozero, falls into Verhnee Chalmozero.
