= Battle of Skuodas (1658) =

1658 military conflict in Lithuania

Coordinates: 56°16′9″N 21°31′17″E

- Part of The Deluge
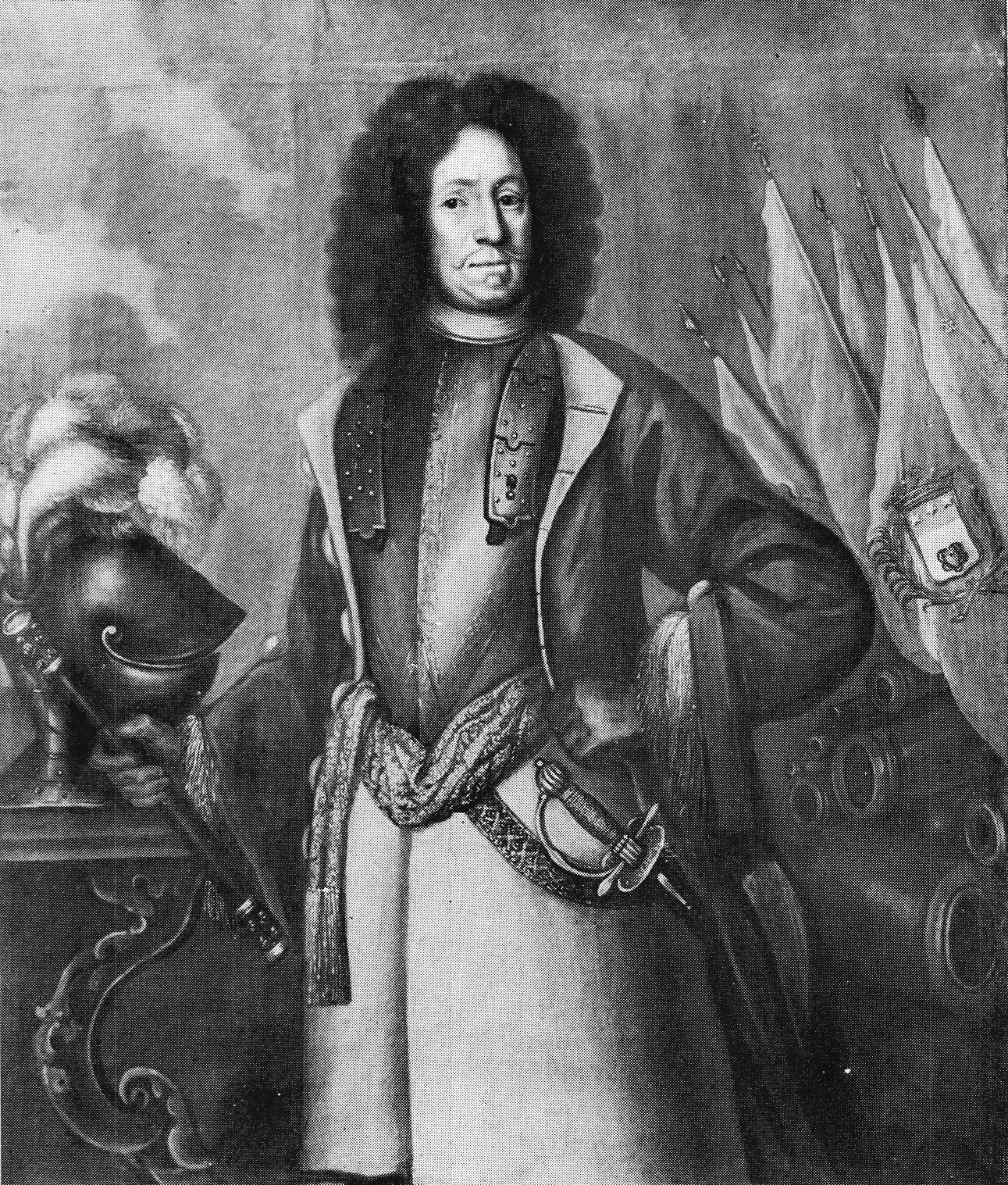
- Field Marshal Robert Douglas
Date	May 18, 1658
Location	Lithuania
Result	Indecisive

Belligerents
(Swedish Empire) Kingdom of Sweden	Polish–Lithuanian Commonwealth

Commanders and leaders
(Swedish Empire) Robert Douglas	(Polish–Lithuanian Commonwealth) Samuel Komorowski

The Battle of Skuodas happened during the Swedish Deluge on May 18, 1658 near Skuodas, the Hussar Captain Samuel Komorowski fought an unresolved battle against the army of Field Marshal Robert Douglas, who was forced to resign from the attack on Samogitia.

== See also ==
- Skuodas Manor

== Sources ==
- Podhorodecki, Leszek (1985). Rapier i koncerz. Z dziejów wojen polsko-szwedzkich (in Polish) (1st ed.). Warsaw: Książka i Wiedza. ISBN 830511452X. OCLC 16676359.
