= Liva =

Liva may refer to:

- Līva (river), a river in Latvia
- Līva, former name of Liepāja
- Liva, Estonia, a village in Estonia
- Liva (album), a live album by Gåte
- Liva Weel, Danish singer and actress
- Liwa (Arabic), the Arabic alternative name for a sanjak, an Ottoman administrative division

== See also ==
- Light-induced voltage alteration, abbreviated LIVA
