= Aucugals =

Neighbourhood of Liepāja, Latvia

Coordinates: 56°28′N 21°01′E

Aucugals is one of the suburbs of Liepāja, Latvia.

It is located south of the city of Liepaja in Nica Municipality.
