= Nīca Municipality =

Municipality of Latvia

Coordinates: 56°20′46″N 21°03′44″E

Nīca Municipality Nīcas novads
- Municipality
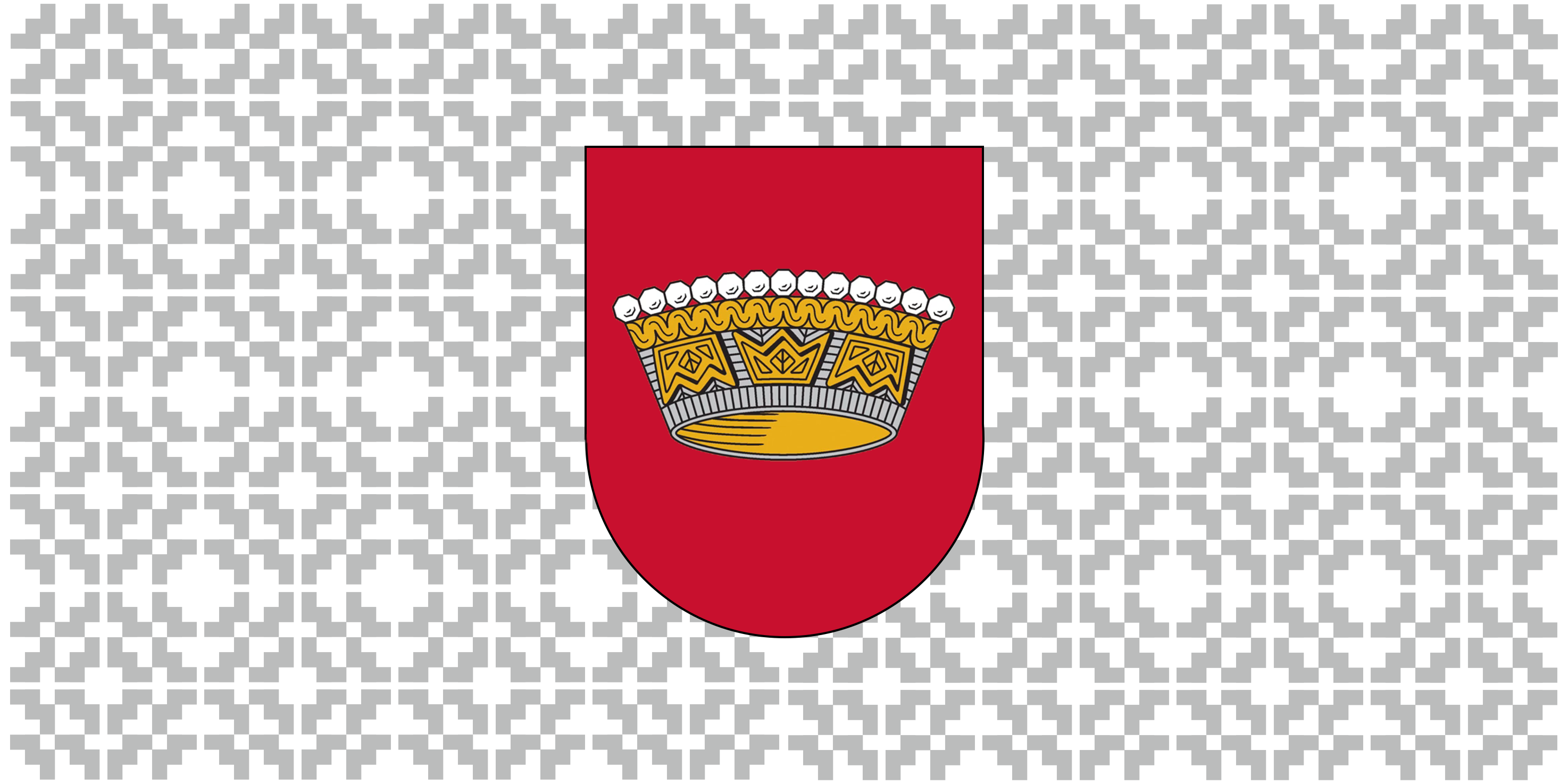
- Flag Coat of arms

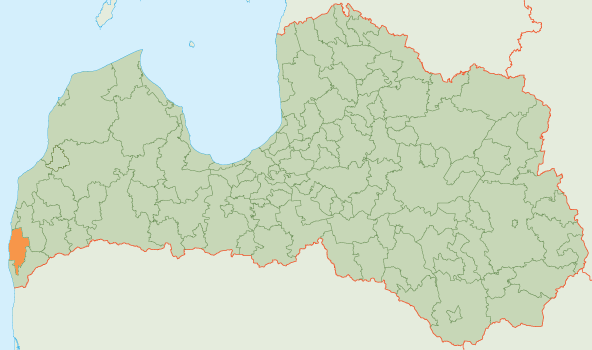
- Country: Latvia
- Formed: 2009
- Dissolved: 2021
- Centre: Nīca

Government
  - Council Chair: Agris Petermanis (For The Development of Nīca Municipality)

Area
  - Total: 350.83 km^{2} (135.46 sq mi)
  - Land: 324.42 km^{2} (125.26 sq mi)
  - Water: 26.41 km^{2} (10.20 sq mi)

Population (2021)
  - Total: 3,113
  - Density: 9.596/km^{2} (24.85/sq mi)
- Website: www.nica.lv

Nīca Municipality (Latvian: Nīcas novads) is a former municipality in Courland, Latvia. The administrative center was the village of Nīca. As of 2020, the municipality's population was 3,100.

== Geography ==
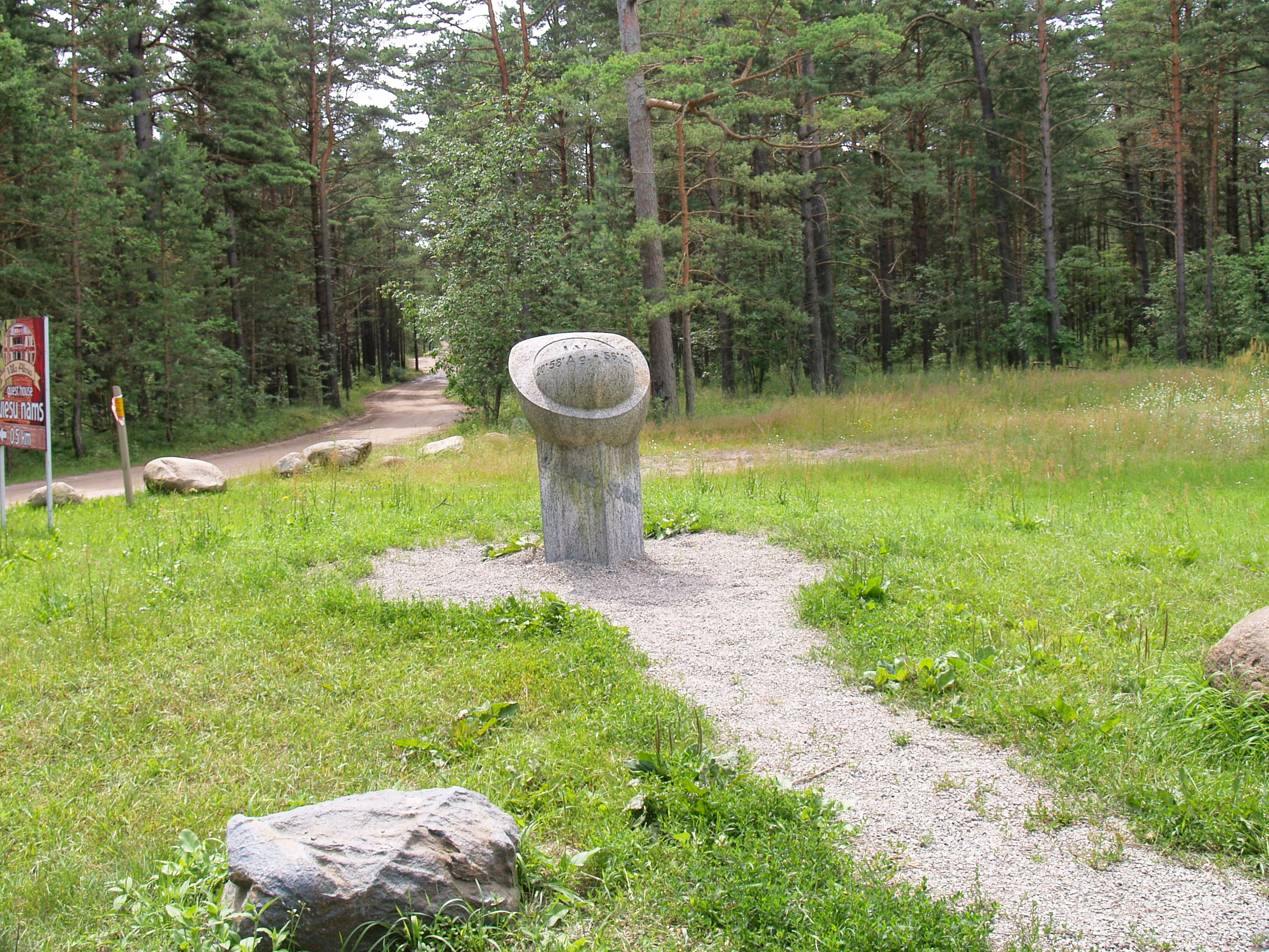
Green Ray (Zaļais stars): stone monument marking the westernmost point in Latvia

The municipality was located in western Latvia, on the coast of the Baltic Sea. The westernmost point in Latvia was located within its territory. The highest elevation point is Pūsēni Hill (Latvian: Pūsēnu kāpa) at 37 m (121 ft). Parts of the municipality lie below sea level. Its geography is dominated by coastal plains, and its territory is part of the Bārtava Plain (Latvian: Bārtavas līdzenums) region.

== History ==
The municipality was formed in 2009 by merging Nīca Parish and Otaņķi Parish, as part of the 2009 administrative reform.

Nīca Municipality ceased to exist on 1 July 2021, when it was merged into the newly formed South Kurzeme Municipality.

== Subdivision ==
The municipality was subdivided into 2 parishes, namely:

- Nīca Parish
- Otaņķi Parish

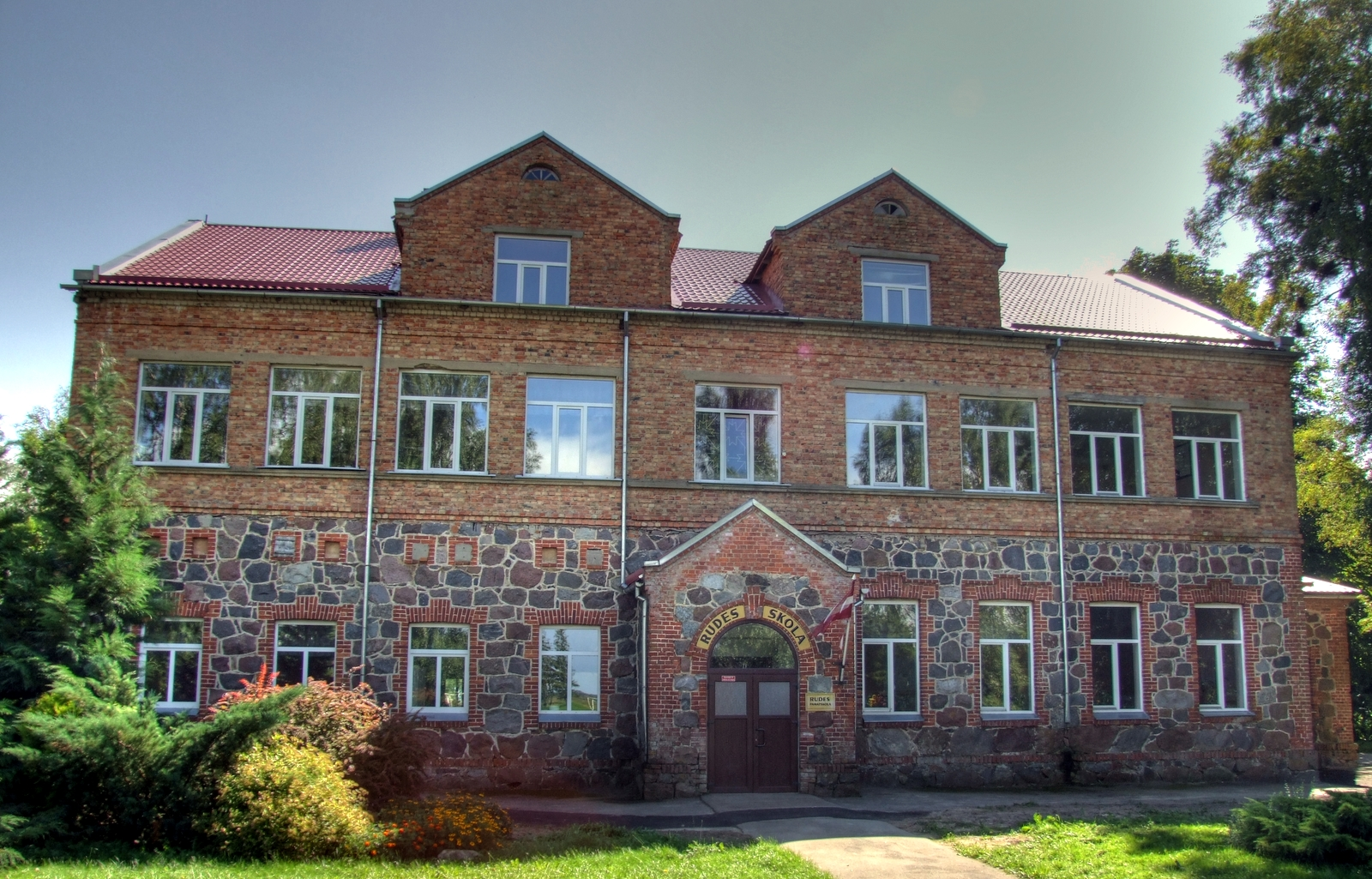
School in Rude near Nīca

== See also ==
- Administrative divisions of Latvia (2009)
