= Nīca Parish =

Parish of Latvia

- parish of Latvia
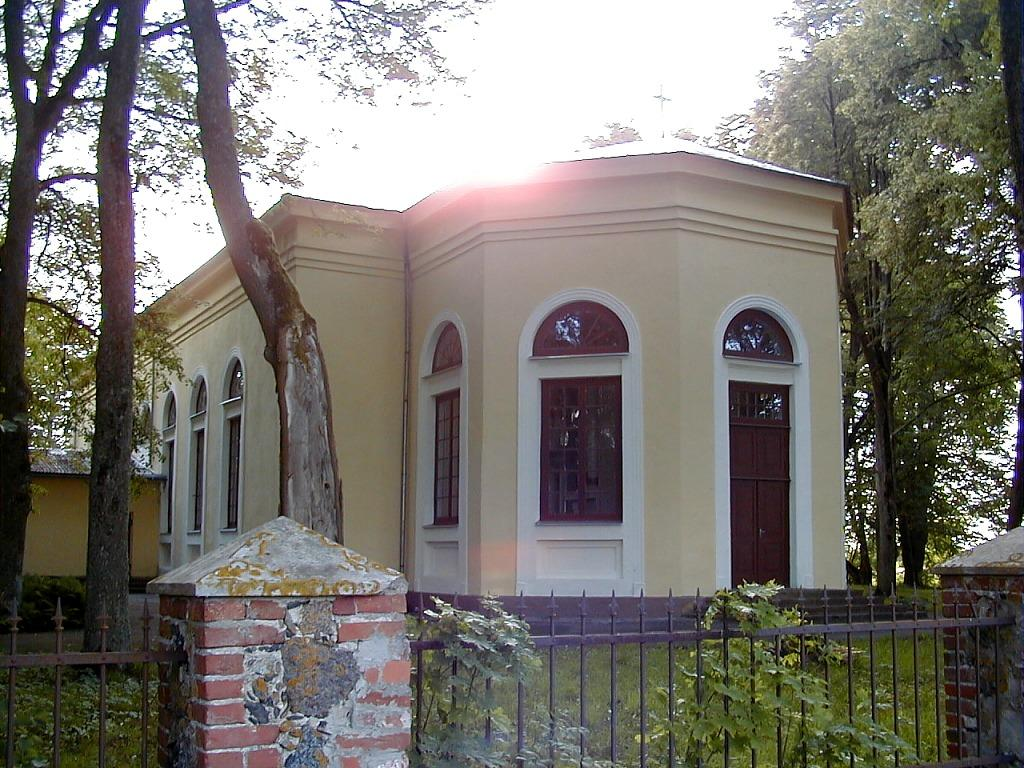

- Coat of arms

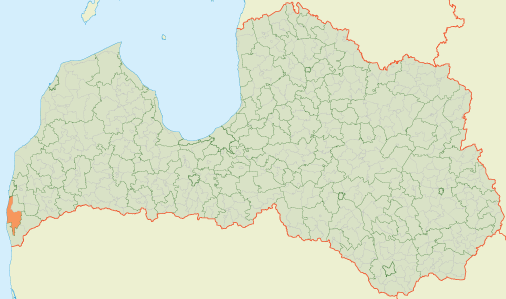
- 56°19′03″N 21°04′23″E
- Country: Latvia

Area
  - Total: 230.44 km^{2} (88.97 sq mi)
  - Land: 216.43 km^{2} (83.56 sq mi)
  - Water: 14.01 km^{2} (5.41 sq mi)

Population (1 January 2025)
  - Total: 2,369
  - Density: 10.95/km^{2} (28.35/sq mi)

Nīca Parish (Latvian: Nīcas pagasts) is an administrative unit of South Kurzeme Municipality in the Courland region of Latvia. Its center is the village of Nīca.

The parish has a population of 2,896 (as of January 7, 2010) and covers an area of 230.3 square kilometres (88.9 sq mi).

From 2009 to 2021, the parish was a part of Nīca Municipality.

== Villages of Nīca Parish ==
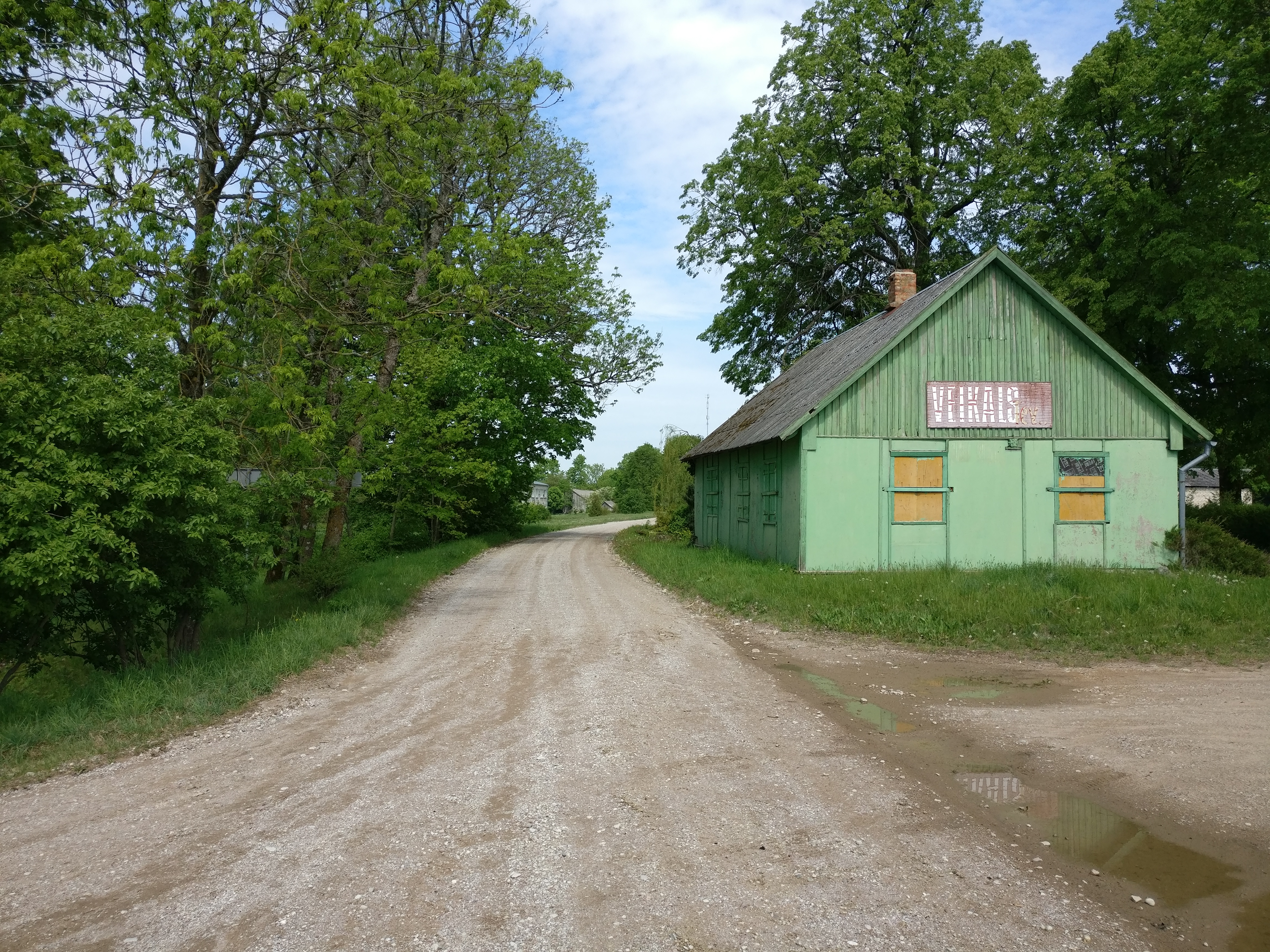
Kalnišķi

- Aucugals
- Auzumuiža
- Bernāti
- Bētiņu ciems
- Brušvītu ciems
- Cenkone
- Jaunciems
- Jūrmalciems
- Kairu ciems
- Kalnišķi: south of Liepāja on the A11 highway. It has an estimated population of 29.
- Klampju ciems
- Lauciņciems
- Nīca
- Paipu ciems
- Pērkone
- Reiņugals
- Sējējciems
- Sīklesciems
- Skatre
