= Bārta =

River in Latvia and Lithuania

Coordinates: 56°24′59″N 21°03′04″E

Bārta / Bartuva
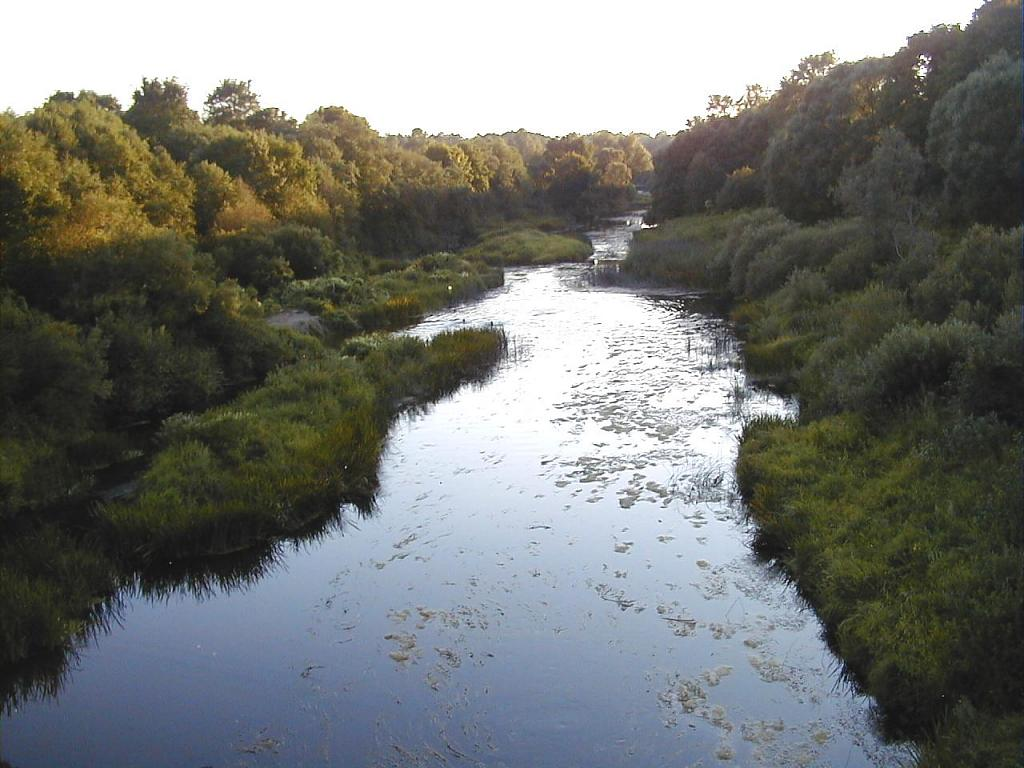
- Bārta in Latvia

Location
- Country: Lithuania and Latvia

Physical characteristics
- Source
  - location: Plungė district
- Mouth
  - location: Liepāja lake
- Length: 103 km (64 mi) (56 km in Lithuania; 47 km in Latvia)
- Basin size: 2,016 km^{2} (778 sq mi) (980 km^{2} in Lithuania; 1036 km^{2} in Latvia)
- Discharge
  - average: 11.1 m^{3}/s (390 cu ft/s)

Bārta (in Latvian), also named Bartuva (in Lithuanian), is a river in western Lithuania and Latvia. It originates in the Plungė district, 3 km to north of Lake Plateliai. The Bārta flows in a northwesterly direction, passing through the Skuodas district and the city of Skuodas, before entering Latvia. The Bārta flows into Liepāja lake, which is connected with the Baltic Sea. In its upper courses the valley formed by the Bārta is deep and narrow, while in its lower courses it is much wider.

Bārta's main tributaries are the Eiškūnas, Erla, Luoba, Apšė, Vārtāja.

Major settlements along the river: Nīca (Latvia), Skuodas (Lithuania), Mosėdis (Lithuania), Bārta (Latvia).

The etymology of the name Bārta/Bartuva is unclear. Kazimieras Būga it derived from the Baltic tribe name Bartians. Another version is that it is archaic name which may be connected to Old Russian бара ('puddle'), Ukrainian: бар ('damp place between hills'), Illyrian *bar(b)- ('puddle').
