= Lake Liepāja =

Lake in Latvia

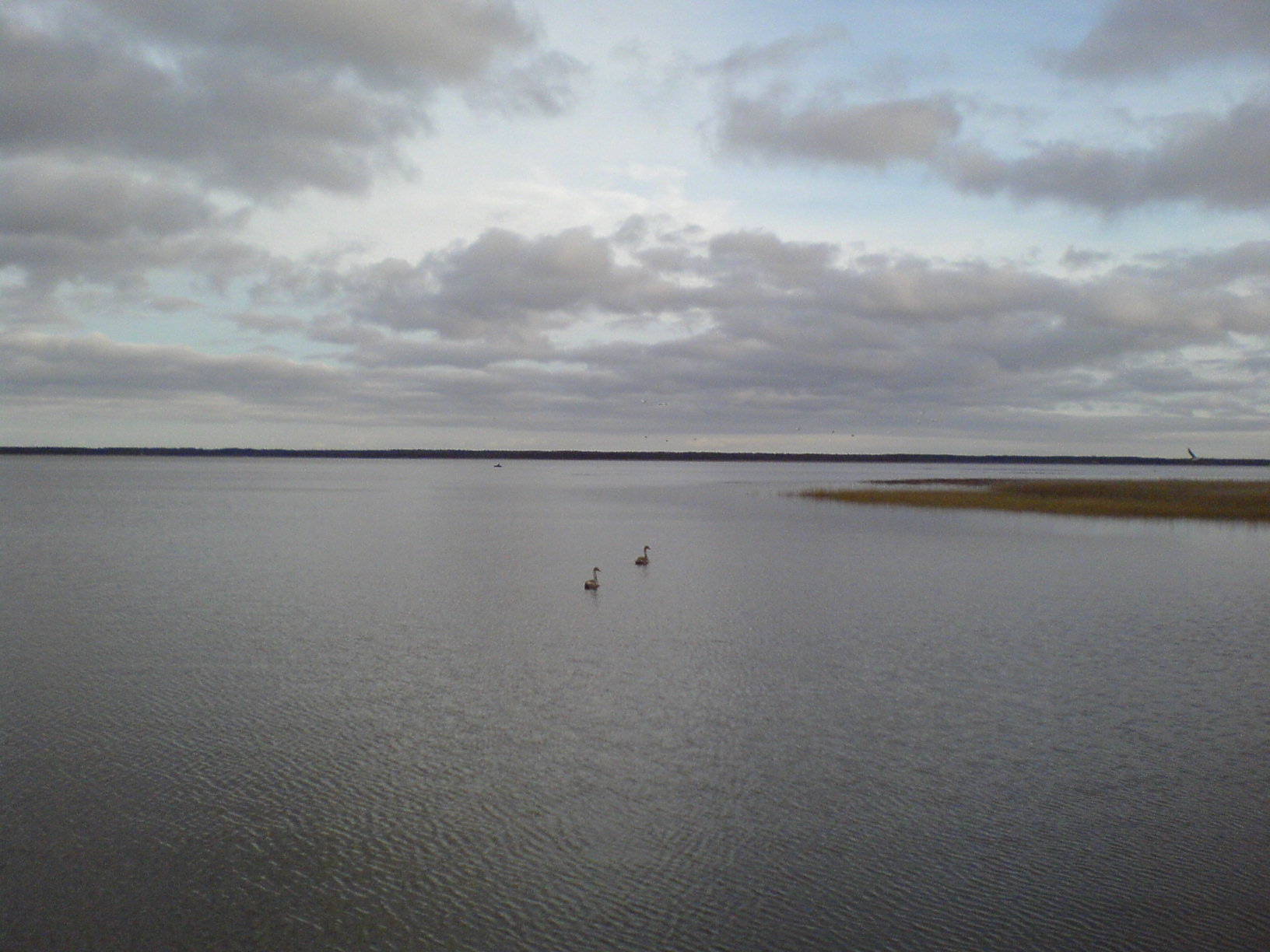

- Location within Latvia
- Coordinates: 56°29′N 21°03′E
- Lake type: natural lake
- Primary inflows: Bārta, Ālande, Otaņķe
- Basin countries: Latvia
- Max. length: 16.2 km (10.1 mi)
- Surface area: 37.15 km^{2} (14.34 sq mi)
- Average depth: 2.0 m (6.6 ft)
- Max. depth: 3.0 m (9.8 ft)
- Shore length^{1}: 44.6 km (27.7 mi)
- Surface elevation: 0–2 m (0.0–6.6 ft)
- Islands: 13
- Settlements: Liepāja
- ^{1} Shore length is not a well-defined measure.

Lake Liepāja (Latvian: Liepājas ezers, formerly Lake Libava, Latvian: Libavas ezers) is the fifth-largest lake in Latvia, located near Liepāja in the Liepāja district. The total area of the lake is 37.15 km^{2}, and it has a length of 16.2 km, average depth of 2.0 m, and a shoreline of 44.6 km.

Lake Liepāja is a pod-shaped shallow eutrophic coastal lake with extensive areas of emergent vegetation (Phragmites, Typha, Scirpus, Sparganium), surrounded by seasonally flooded meadows and arable land. Polders and dams enclose most of the wetland area. The lake has 14 species of fish: pike, roach, perch, bream, crucian carp, tench, eel, vimba, burbot, carp, zander, smelt, bitterling, and rudd. In May only licensed fishing is allowed. The price of a licence is 10 LVL (about $20). From 1977 to 1999 the lake was an ornithological preserve with 2 species of birds: swans and ducks. Since 2004 the lake has been included on the European Union Natura 2000 protected territories list. In 2008, a nature protection plan for Lake Liepāja was developed by the Grontmij Carl Bro company.

== Islands ==
Lake Liepāja has 13 islands, the most notable of which are Atteku(-as), Zirgu, Pērkona, Putnu (kalva) and Cionas. On the east shore of the lake is the Friča grove, and on the west shore near Pērkone is the Reiņu Forest (Latvian: Reiņu mežs).

== History ==
Historically, Lake Liepāja was connected with Lake Tosmare by Vernen Creek, but in the 20th century the creek was filled in. Later in the 20th century the Fortress Canal (Latvian: Cietokšņa kanāls, Melnupīte, Russian: Чёрная речка), which connects the lake to the Lake Tosmare and the sea, was dug. In the second half of the 20th century, the plant Liepājas Metalurgs built the Golodov Dam to separate the polluted part of the lake from the rest of the lake.

== Rivers ==
The Ālande, Bārta, Otaņķe (Brūnupe), Līčupe, Orbupe, and Dorupe rivers flow into the lake.
