= Skuodas Manor =

Coordinates: 56°16′9″N 21°31′17″E

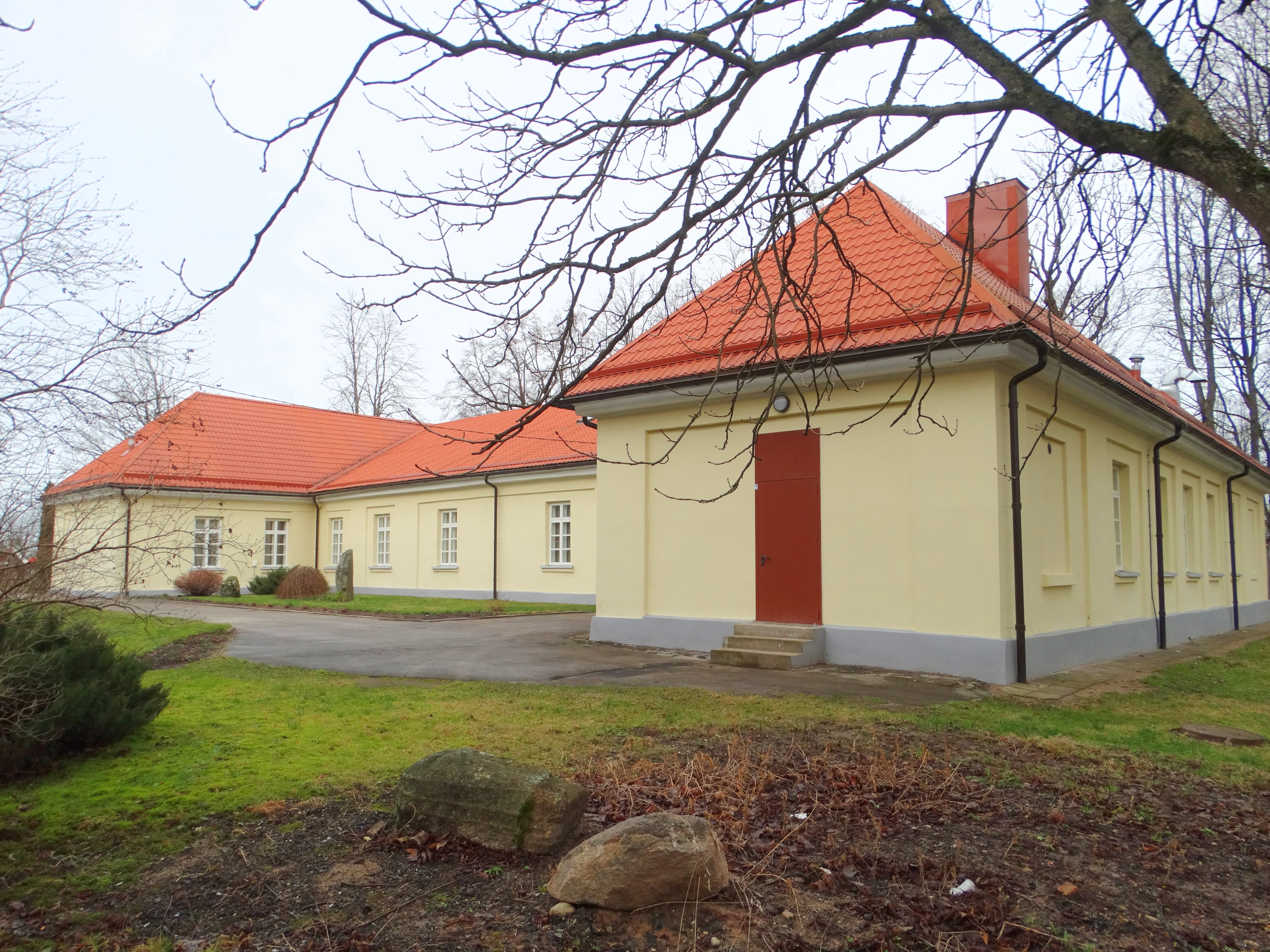
Skuodo dvaras+

Skuodas Manor is a former residential manor in Skuodas, Lithuania.
