= Skuodas =

Village in Samogitia, Lithuania

- City
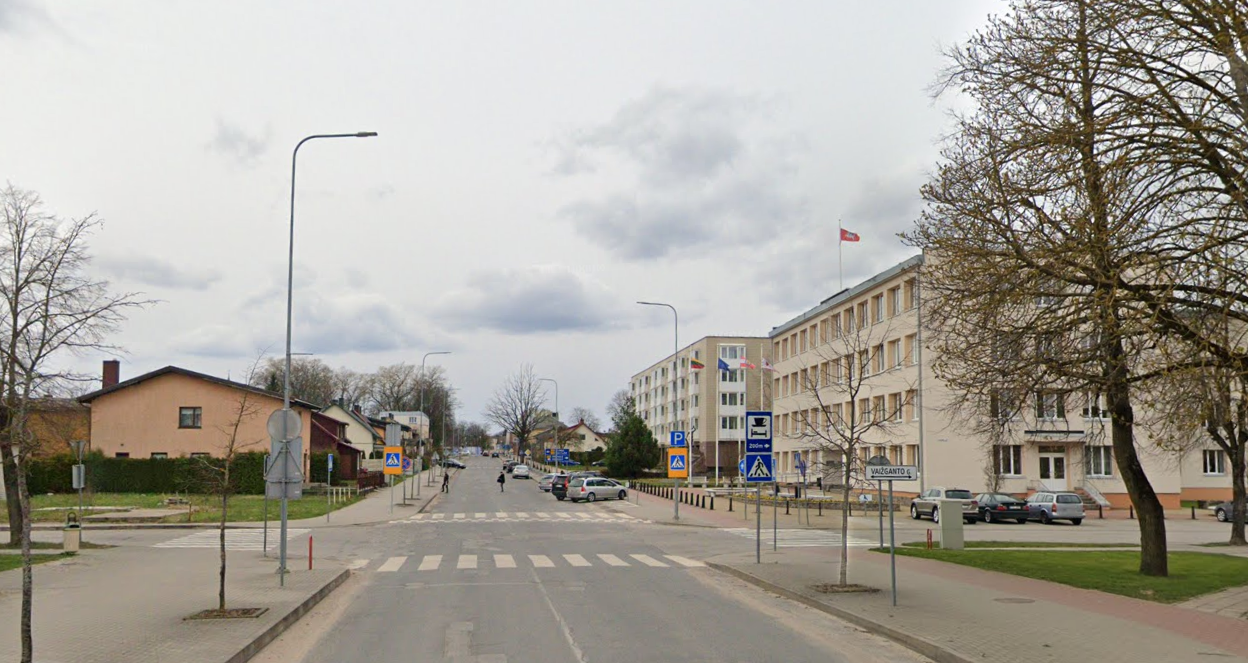
- Vilnius str. in Skuodas in 2022

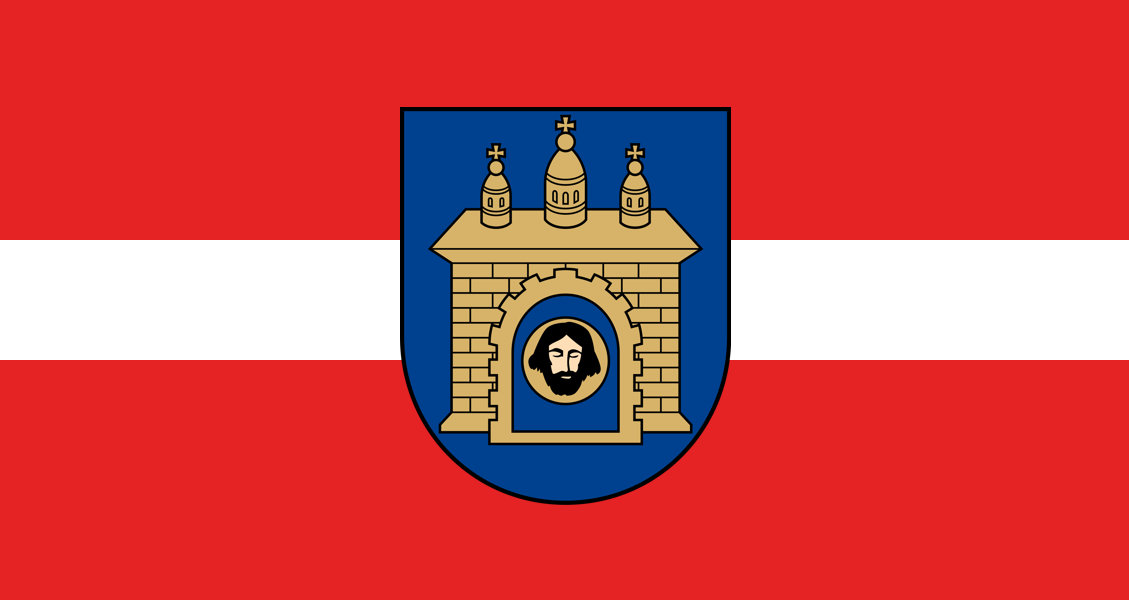
- Flag Coat of arms

- Location of Skuodas
- Coordinates: 56°16′0″N 21°32′0″E
- Country: Lithuania
- Ethnographic region: Samogitia
- County: Klaipėda County
- Municipality: Skuodas district municipality
- Eldership: Skuodas town eldership
- Capital of: Skuodas district municipality Skuodas town eldership Skuodas eldership
- First mentioned: 1253
- Granted city rights: 1572

Population (2021)
  - Total: 5,508
- Time zone: UTC+2 (EET)
  - Summer (DST): UTC+3 (EEST)

Skuodas (Samogitian: Skouds) is a city located in Klaipėda County, in northwestern Lithuania, on the border with Latvia. The Bartuva river flows through the town. Is currently the capital of Skuodas District Municipality.

== History ==
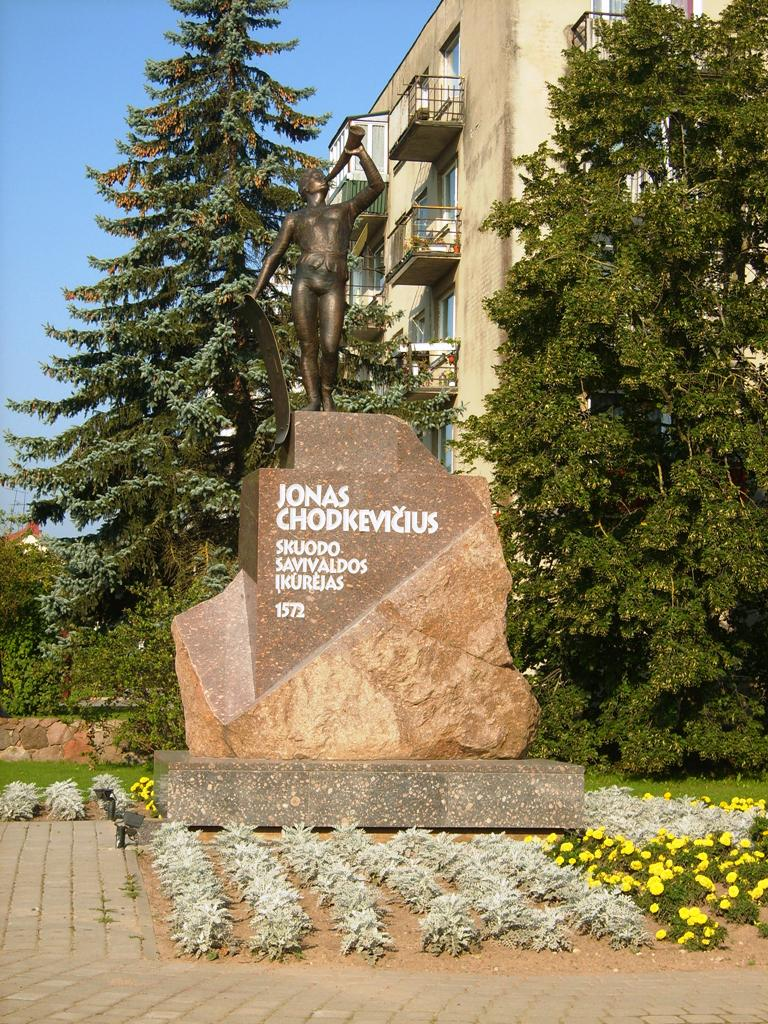
Monument of Jan Hieronimowicz Chodkiewicz

Skuodas was first mentioned in written sources in 1253. At that time it belonged to Ceklis land. In 1572 Chełmno municipal rights were granted to Skuodas thanks to Jan Hieronimowicz Chodkiewicz who owned the city. The same year after the city rights were granted, a new part of the city started to settle on the right wing of Bartuva river. In the centre of this part there were built a new rectangular square, town hall, commercial buildings. It was a private town, administratively located in the Duchy of Samogitia of the Polish–Lithuanian Commonwealth. In 1614, Jan Karol Chodkiewicz, one of the greatest military commanders in the history of the Polish–Lithuanian Commonwealth, founded a new parish church with an adjacent school.

In 1625, the town passed as a trousseau to the Sapieha family. In 1645, the municipal rights were changed to Magdeburg rights by Władysław IV Vasa. Sapieha family owned the city until 1832. In 1776 Skuodas lost city rights and became just a border city with a customs.

In 1821 present masonry Evangelical Lutheran Church was built. In 1847 the current Catholic Church was built using masonry of stone and bricks. It reflects features of Romanesque Revival architecture. This church was consecrated by bishop Motiejus Valančius in 1850. In 1614 parish school was established.

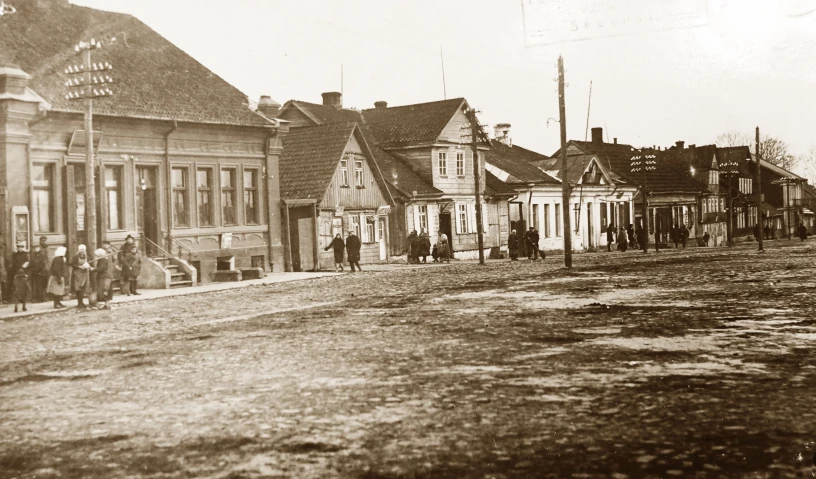
Skuodas in the interwar period

Railway branch line Priekule-Klaipėda was built in 1915 and printing house was established in 1911.

The town had a Jewish community in the 19th century, with four synagogues. By 1897, almost 2,300 Jews formed 60% of the population and dominated commerce in the town.

During the interwar period Skuodas had about 4410 inhabitants. It was known for its shoe factory Kontinent. Skuodas also had a new cinema with modern equipment.

The city suffered severely during World War II. It was occupied by the Soviet Union from 1940, then by Nazi Germany from 1941, and once again by the Soviet Union from 1944. In 1941, following the German invasion, and the establishment of persecutions by Lithuanian collaborators, 500 Jews of the town were massacred.

After the war the ruined rectangular square was rebuilt. In 1992 the coat of arms of Skuodas was approved.

Nowadays Skuodas has a gymnasium, a primary school, a secondary school and a high school. There is also a museum, post office, centre of the culture, central hospital of municipality, foster home and public library in the city.

=== History of the name ===
The city's name Skuodas originated from the surname, Skuodas. In Polish it was known as Szkudy, and in German as Schoden.

At the end of the 16th century, the new part of the city was called Johanisberg or Johanisburg. However these names did not catch on.

== Famous residents ==
- Eugenijus Gedgaudas (1924-2006), Lithuanian born USA radiologist;
- Simonas Daukantas (1793-1864), famous Lithuanian historian, author of the first historical works in Lithuanian;
- Vaclovas Intas (1927-2007), doctor, founder of Mosėdis Museum of Stones;
- Vytautas Vaclovas Donėla (born 1930), Lithuanian philosopher;
- Alvydas Duonėla (born 1976), retired Lithuanian canoeist, world champion;
- Vygaudas Ušackas (born 1964), a Lithuanian diplomat, former Lithuania's Minister for Foreign Affairs, current European Union's special representative and the head of EU mission for Russia;
- Remigijus Motuzas (born 1956), a Lithuanian diplomat, current ambassador of Lithuania to Russia;
- Zinaida Sendriūtė (born 1984), a Lithuanian discus thrower, represented Lithuania in the 2016 Olympic Games.

== Twin cities ==
- Lindås Municipality, Norway

== Gallery ==
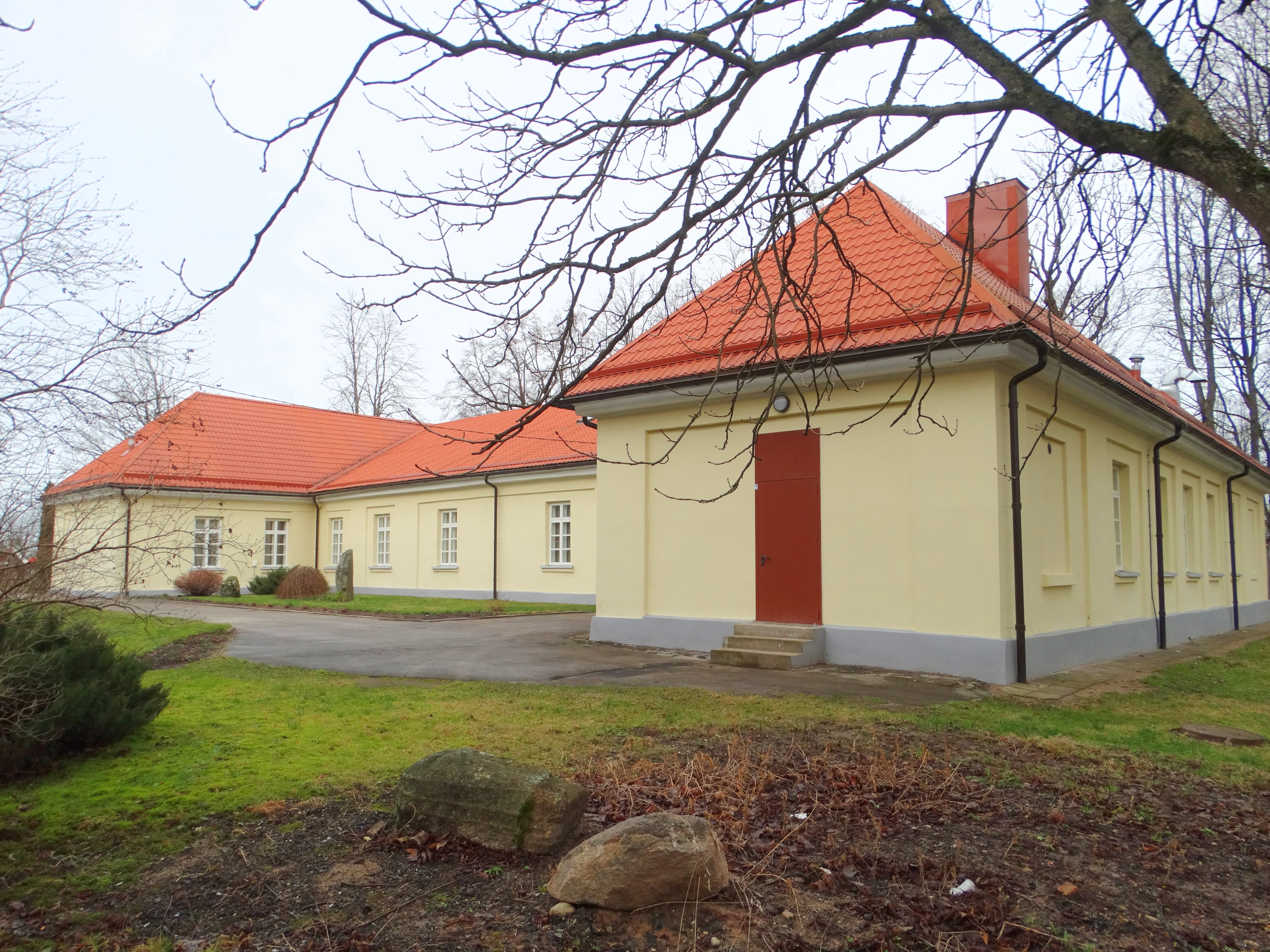
Skuodas Manor

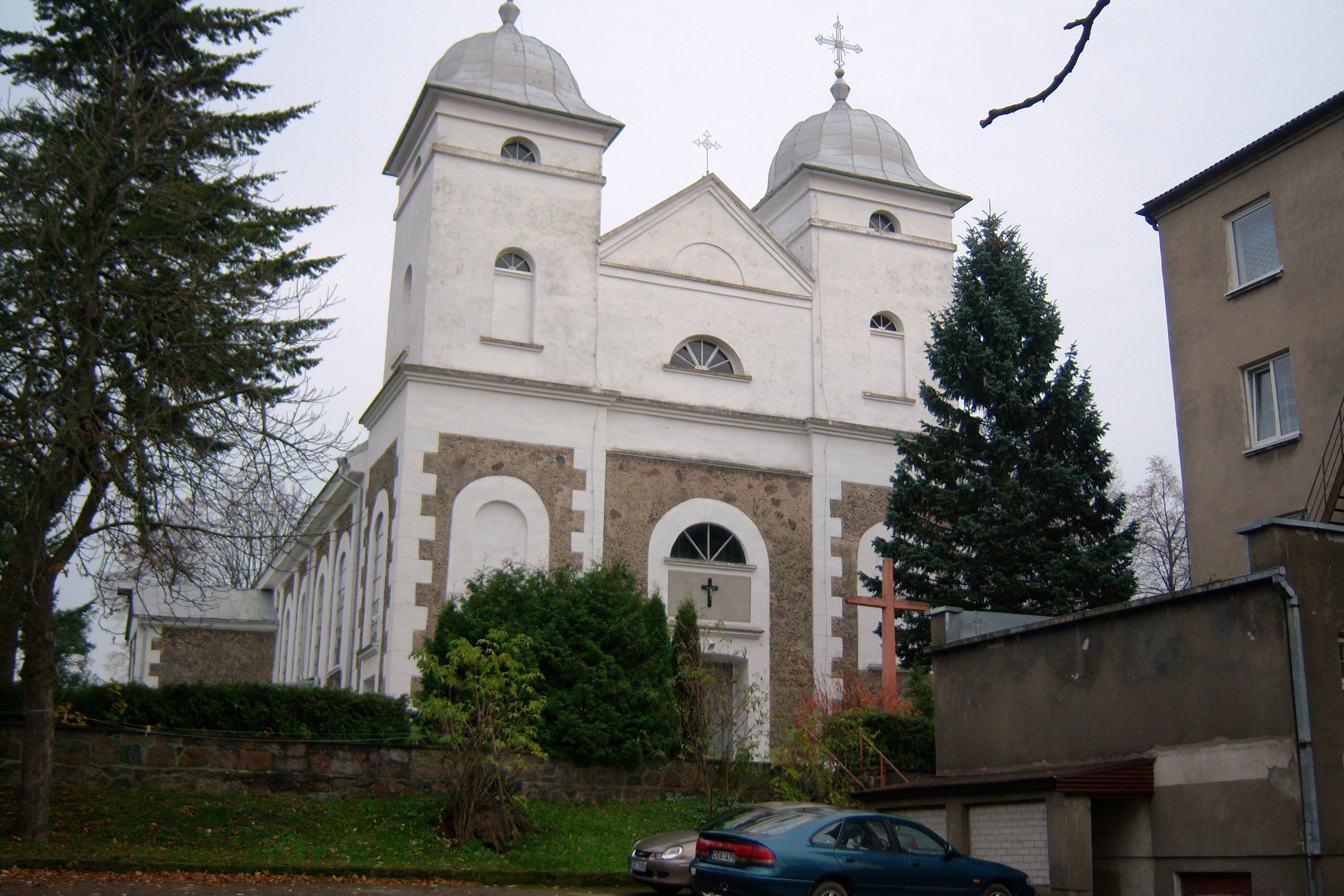
Holy Trinity church

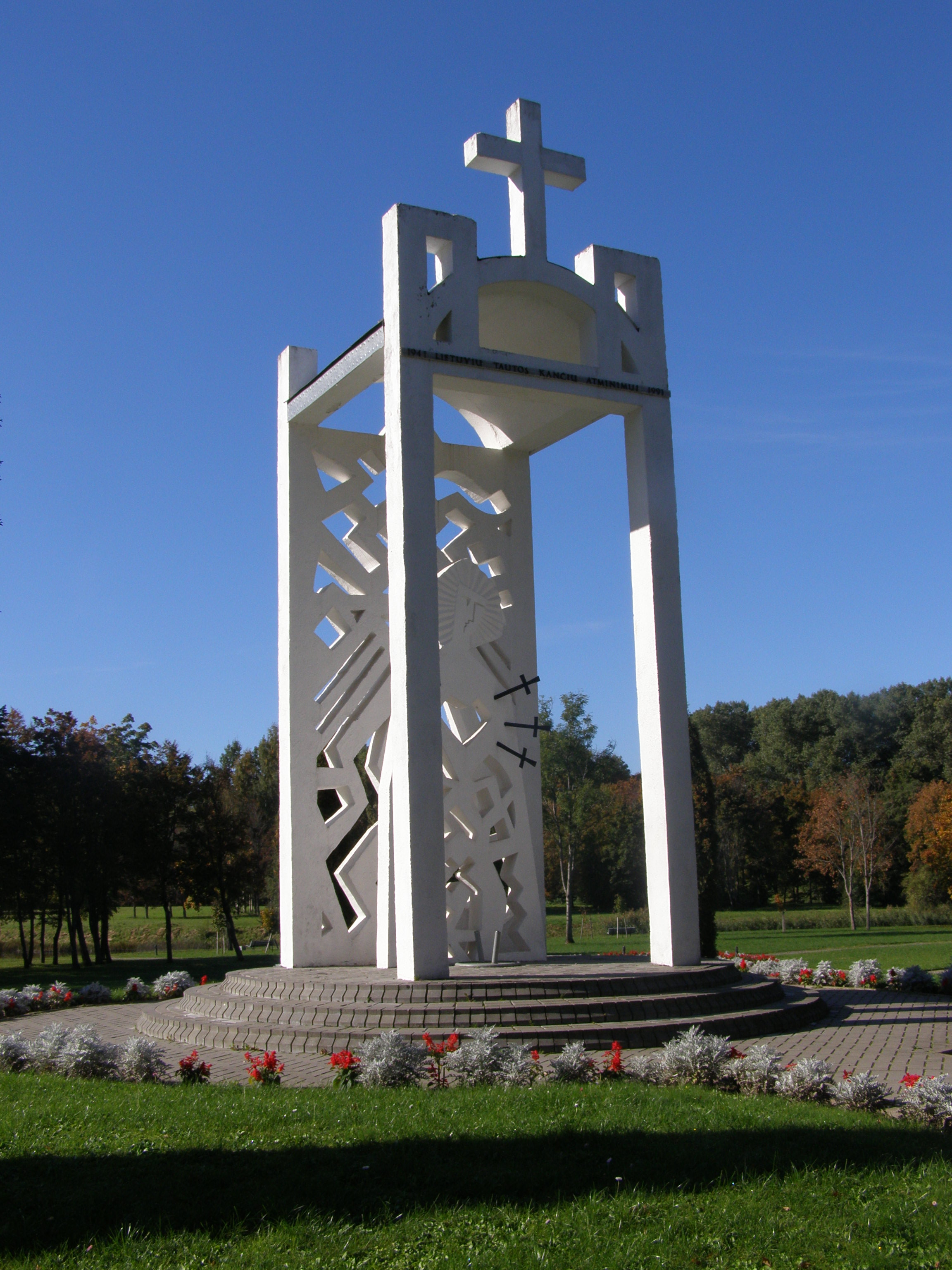
Monument for the Pain of the Nation

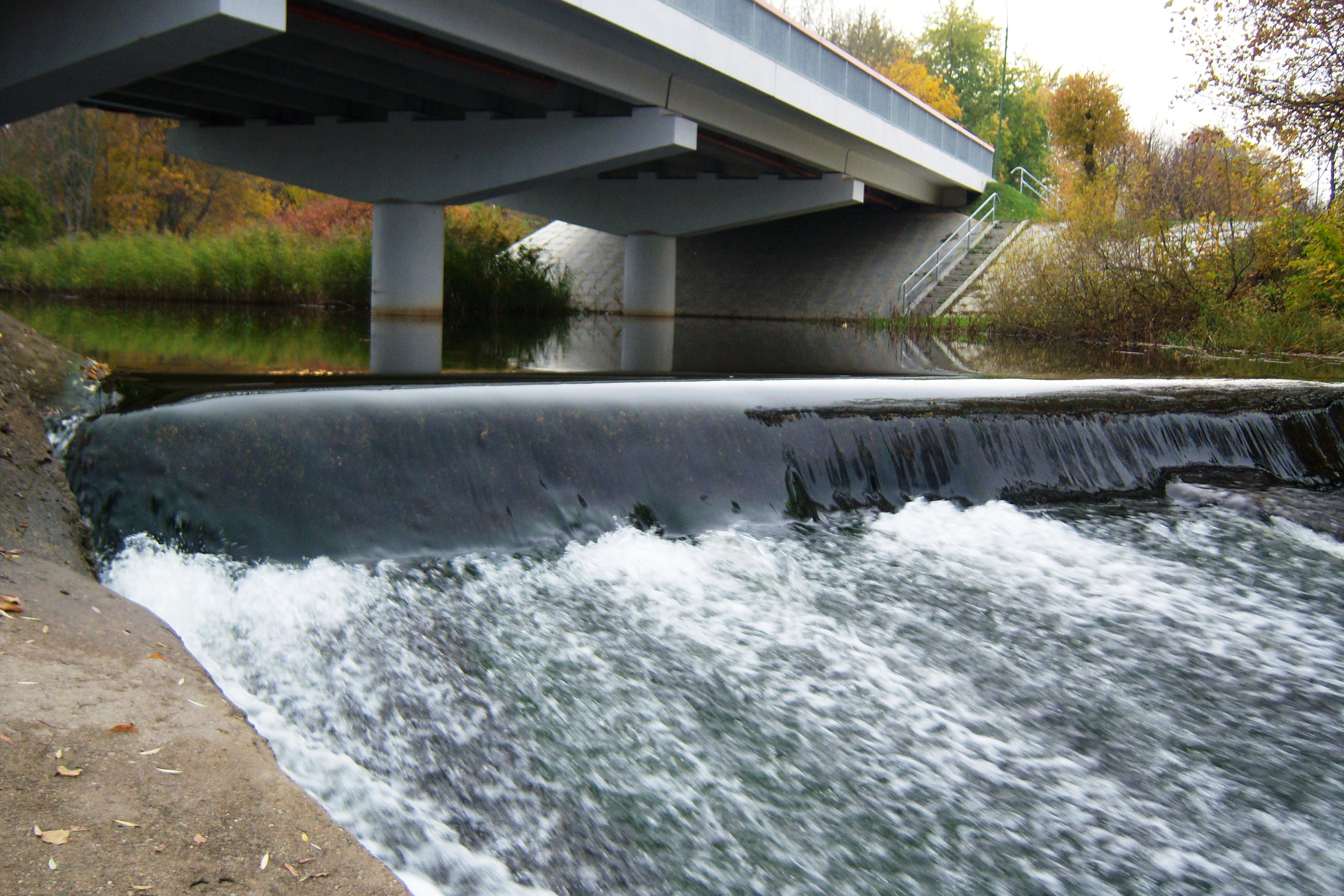
Bartuva river in Skuodas

== See also ==
- Skuodas district municipality
