= Pērkone =

Village in Latvia

- Village
- Location of Pērkone in Latvia
- Coordinates: 56°25′0″N 21°00′52″E
- Country: Latvia
- Municipality: South Kurzeme
- Parish: Nīca

Pērkone (German: Perkuhnenhof, Pērkons inn) is a small suburban settlement in Nīca Parish, South Kurzeme Municipality, in the Courland region of Latvia. It is situated near the southern border of Liepāja. Near Pērkone is located Reiņu forest (Latvian: Reiņu mežs), one of the closest to Liepāja forests.

Pērkone is chiefly known because near it are located the hotel "Jūrnieka Ligzda" and the guest house "Vērbeļnieki".
