= Nīca =

Village in Latvia

- Village
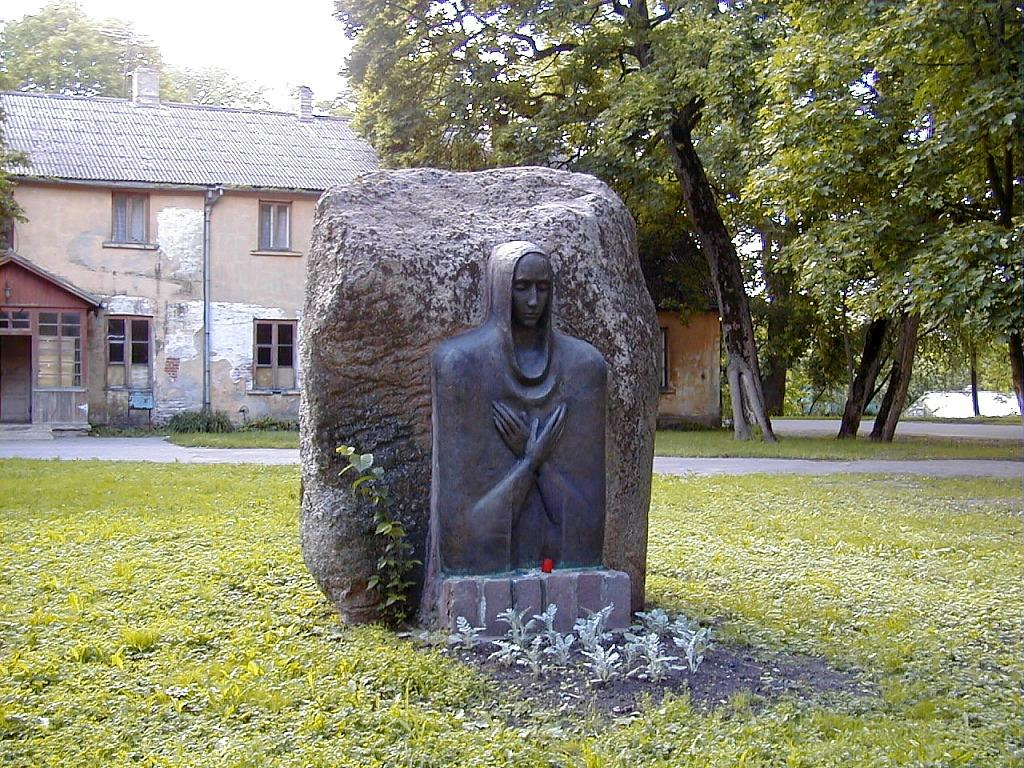
- Memorial to the victims of repression during the Soviet occupation in Nīca

- Nīca's location in Latvia
- Coordinates: 56°20′45″N 21°3′52″E
- Country: Latvia
- Municipality: South Kurzeme
- Parish: Nīca

Population (2006)
  - Total: 966

Nīca (German: Niederbartau) is a village in the Nīca Parish of South Kurzeme Municipality in the Courland region of Latvia. Nīca had 981 residents as of 2006.
