= Vaiņode Parish =

Parish of Latvia

- parish of Latvia
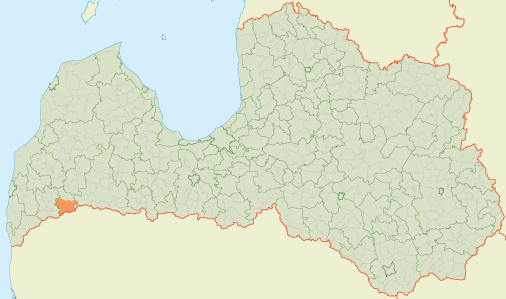
- 56°25′01″N 21°49′56″E
- Country: Latvia

Area
  - Total: 185.27 km^{2} (71.53 sq mi)
  - Land: 185.27 km^{2} (71.53 sq mi)
  - Water: 4.34 km^{2} (1.68 sq mi)

Population (1 January 2024)
  - Total: 1,852
  - Density: 10.0/km^{2} (26/sq mi)
- Website: www.vainode.lv

Vaiņode Parish (Latvian: Vaiņodes pagasts) is an administrative unit of South Kurzeme Municipality in the Courland region of Latvia. The parish has a population of 2518 (as of 1/07/2010) and covers an area of 189.7 km^{2}.

== Villages of Vaiņode parish ==
- Auguste
- Bātasmuiža (Lielbāta)
- Mālkalne
- Vaiņode
- Vaiņodes muiža (Garnizons)
- Vecbāta

== History ==
The present territory of Vaiņode Parish was located at the southern end of the Curonian Bandava land at the end of the 12th century. The first details of this place are from 1253. for the first time the name of Baten was mentioned in Livonian Order and Bishopric of Courland in the Treaty of Partition of Courland. The area of Vaiņode came to the Bishopric of Courland. From 1585 the area came to the Piltene region and from 1795 to Courland Governorate. After the administrative reform of 1819, the parish was included in Aizpute County Embūte Parish. In 1888 the parishes of Elkuzeme, Pleppo and Velde were added to the Vaiņode parish In 1924 Vaiņode Parish was added to Liepāja County. Baht Parish was added to Vaiņode Parish on March 5, 1926.

The settlement of Vaiņode began to develop along with the construction of the Libau–Romny Railway in 1871. During the Revolution of 1905 there was an action committee in the parish, a servant strike took place in the nearby manors, and two manor houses were burnt down. 20 revolutionaries were murdered by the expedition. At the end of the 19th century, on the land of Vaiņode Manor, near the Vaiņode station, a village was formed, mainly inhabited by brick-and-sawmill workers. A summer cottage village grew on Lielbāta Manor's land. In 1925 they merged to form the village of Vaiņode - Bāta.

Built in 1916, Vaiņode Airship Airport. In 1939 upon conclusion of Soviet–Latvian Mutual Assistance Treaty Vainode aerodrome was the site of the USSR military aviation division. Later on, after World War II it was the largest military airfield in the Baltic States.

In the territory of modern Vaiņode parish there was historically the Lielbat Manor (German: Gut Groß-Bahten), Lielbat), Vaiņode Manor (German: Gut Wainoden), Velde Manor (German: Gut Welden) .

In 1935 the parish had an area of 157 km^{2} and a population of 4,079. In 1945 the parish was established by Vaiņode, Elkuzeme, Kaļšu and Veldes village council, but was dissolved in 1949. Priekule district | Priekule district In 1951 Velde village was added to Vaiņode village. In 1954, the village center Vaiņode i was granted the status of working village, but the rest was added to the restored village of Velde. In 1956, the villages of Elkuzeme and Velde were liquidated and annexed to Vaiņode, creating the Vaiņode rural territory . In 1976, the Vaiņode village was re-established to include the Vaiņode rural area. In 1977 part of the village was added to Embūte Parish. In 1990 the village was reorganized into a parish. In 1991 Vaiņode loses its status as a city village and joins the parish. In 2009, Vaiņode Parish was included as an administrative territory in Vaiņode Municipality.

== See also ==
- Vaiņode Air Base
