= Vaiņode Municipality =

Municipality of Latvia

Coordinates: 56°25′06″N 21°51′08″E

Vaiņode Municipality Vaiņodes novads
- Municipality
- Coat of arms

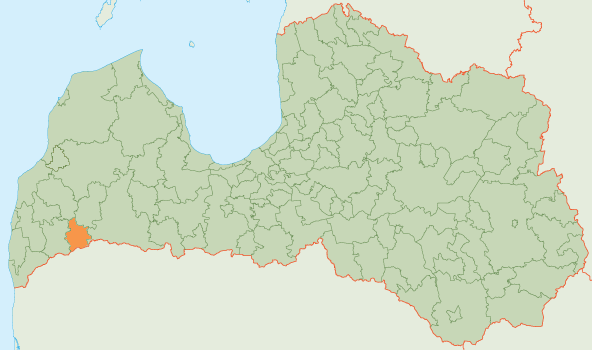
- Country: Latvia
- Formed: 2009
- Centre: Vaiņode

Government
  - Council Chair: Visvaldis Jansons (LZS)

Area
  - Total: 306.95 km^{2} (118.51 sq mi)
  - Land: 299.54 km^{2} (115.65 sq mi)
  - Water: 7.41 km^{2} (2.86 sq mi)

Population (2021)
  - Total: 2,216
  - Density: 7.398/km^{2} (19.16/sq mi)
- Website: www.vainode.lv

Vaiņode Municipality (Latvian: Vaiņodes novads) is a former municipality in Courland, Latvia. The municipality was formed in 2009 by merging Embūte parish and Vaiņode parish; the administrative centre being Vaiņode. The population in 2020 was 2,235.

Vaiņode Municipality ceased to exist on 1 July 2021, when it was merged into the newly formed South Kurzeme Municipality.

== See also ==
- Administrative divisions of Latvia (2009)
