= Vaiņode =

Village in Latvia

- Village
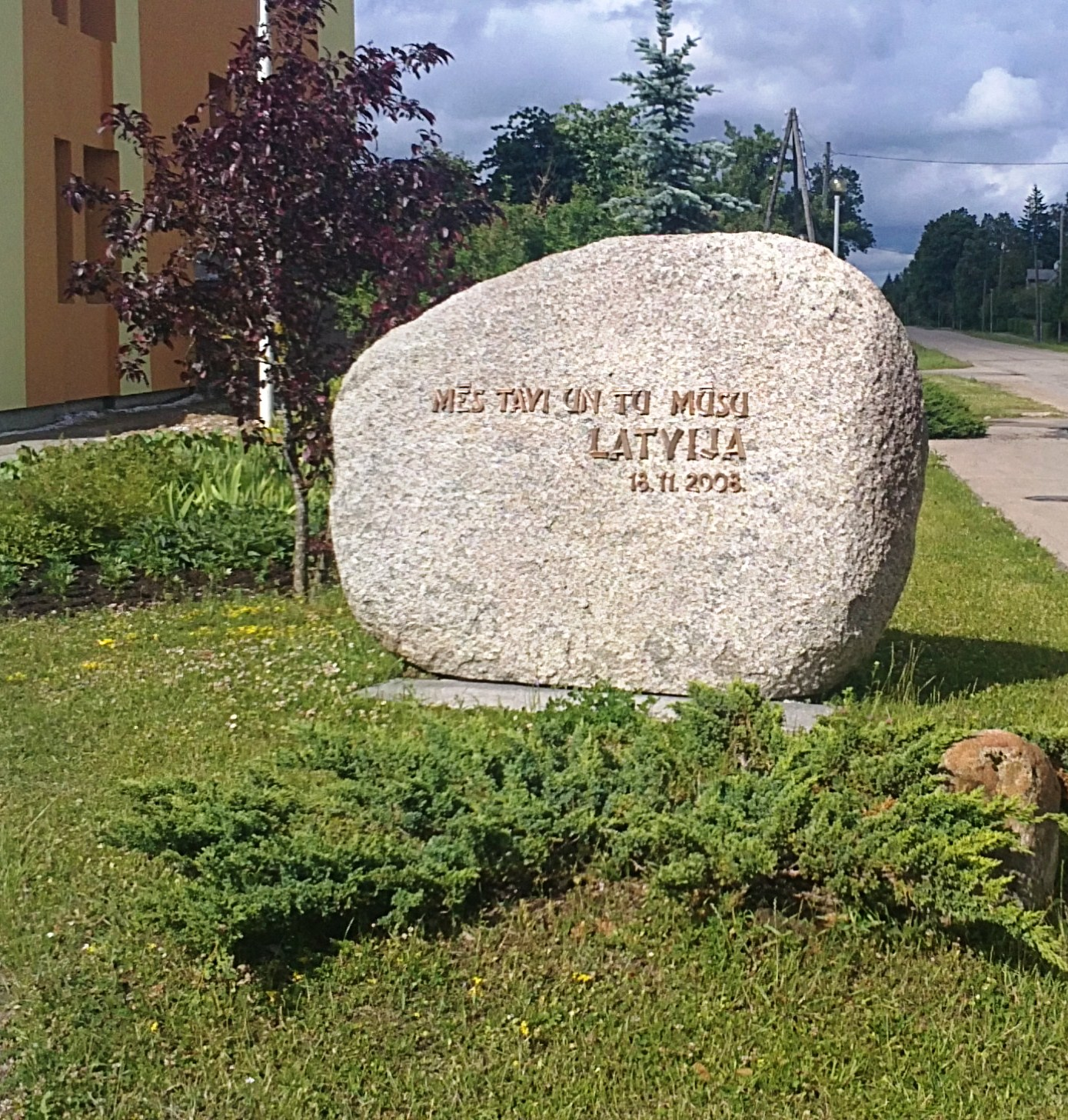
- Stone marking the 90th anniversary of Latvian independence

- Vaiņode's location in Latvia
- Coordinates: 56°24′55″N 21°51′04″E
- Country: Latvia
- Municipality: South Kurzeme
- Parish: Vaiņode
- First mentioned: 1253

Area
  - Total: 3.3 sq mi (8.5 km^{2})

Population (2015)
  - Total: 1,759

Vaiņode (formerly German: Wainoden; Lithuanian: Vainiauda) is a village in Vaiņode Parish, South Kurzeme Municipality in the Courland region of Latvia. The village developed around a railway station after 1871 between Liepāja and Mažeikiai.

== History ==
Vaiņode (Bāta) was first mentioned in historical sources in 1253. The settlement was formed on the land of the Vaiņode Manor (German: Gut Wainoden) after construction of the Libau–Romny Railway in 1871. A summer cottage village Bāta was formed on the land of Lielbāta manor.

Starting in 1916 the Imperial German Navy built north of the village a military compound with an airship yard called Luftschiffhafen Wainoden with two large airship hangars which were later transferred and used as pavilions of the Riga Central Market. The base was used after World War I by the Latvian Army, then later in World War II again by the Germans. Afterwards, during the Soviet occupation of Latvia, it was a Soviet Army compound and an important military airport in the Baltic region including ballistic missiles with a nuclear warheads.

== See also ==
- Vaiņode Air Base
