= Vaiņode Manor =

Manor house in Latvia

- Location within Latvia
- Alternative names: Gut Wainoden

General information
- Location: Vaiņode Parish, Vaiņode Municipality, Latvia
- Coordinates: 56°24′58″N 21°53′46″E
- Completed: 1912
- Client: von Grothuss family

Technical details
- Structural system: Ruins

Design and construction
- Architects: Berči (Bertschy), Makss (1871—1935)

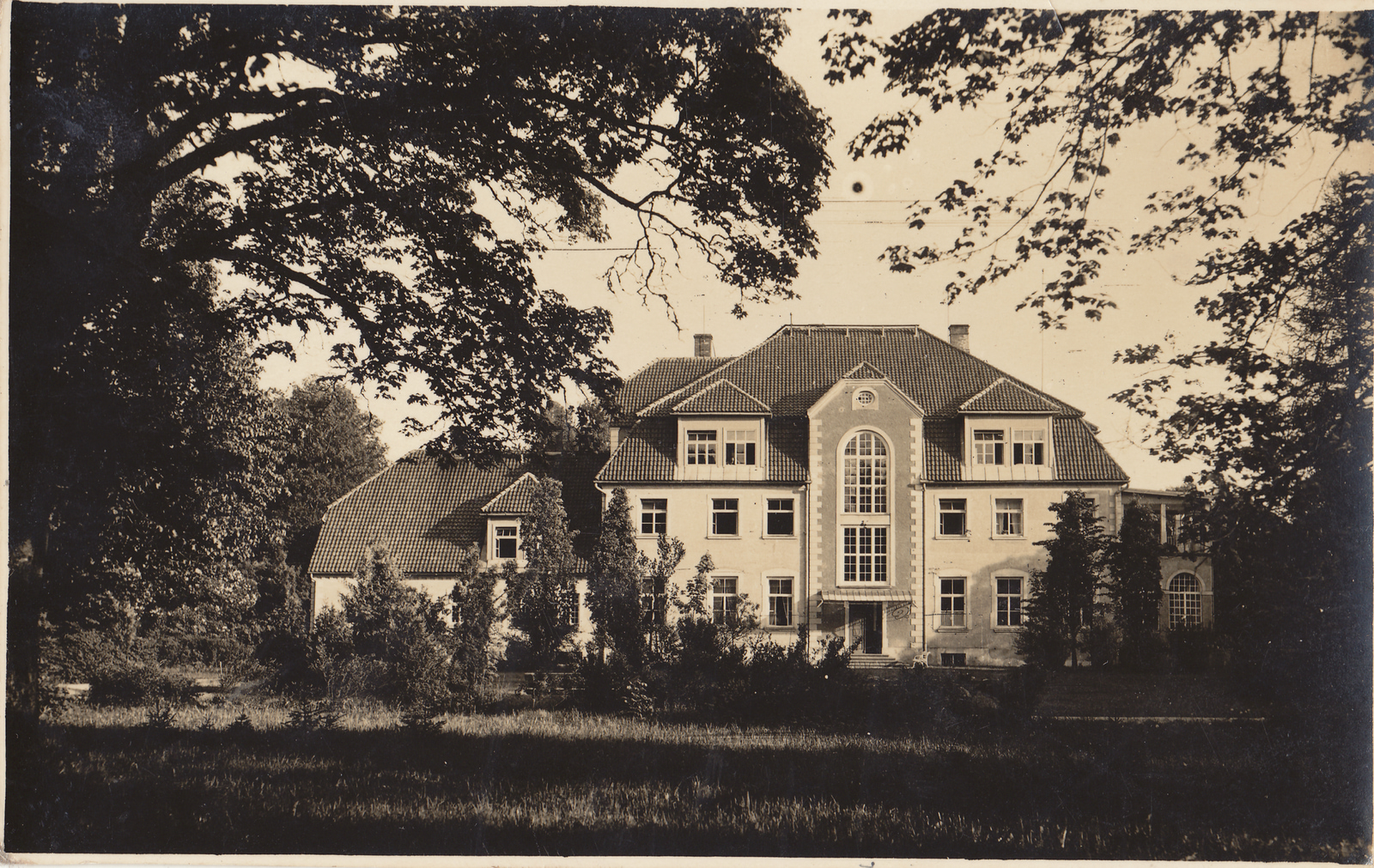

Vaiņode Manor (German: Gut Wainoden, Latvian: Vaiņodes muižas pils) was a manor house in Vaiņode Parish, South Kurzeme Municipality in the Courland region of Latvia.

== History ==
A two-story neo-Renaissance structure with two towers was built on the estate during the second half of the 19th century. The rich interior decoration was designed by August Volz's workshop in Riga. This building was completely destroyed by fire during the 1905 Russian revolution. A massive new three-story manor house with a mansard roof was built on the old foundations in 1912. It was designed by the architect Max Theodor Bertschy (1871–1935), the son of Paul Max Bertschy(1840–1911) for the family of baron von Grothuss. After Latvia's agrarian reform in the 1920s, the manor was converted into a sanatorium for state employees. This second structure was in turn destroyed during World War II and never rebuilt.

== See also ==
- List of palaces and manor houses in Latvia
