= Embūte =

Village in Latvia

Coordinates: 56.506°N 21.819°E

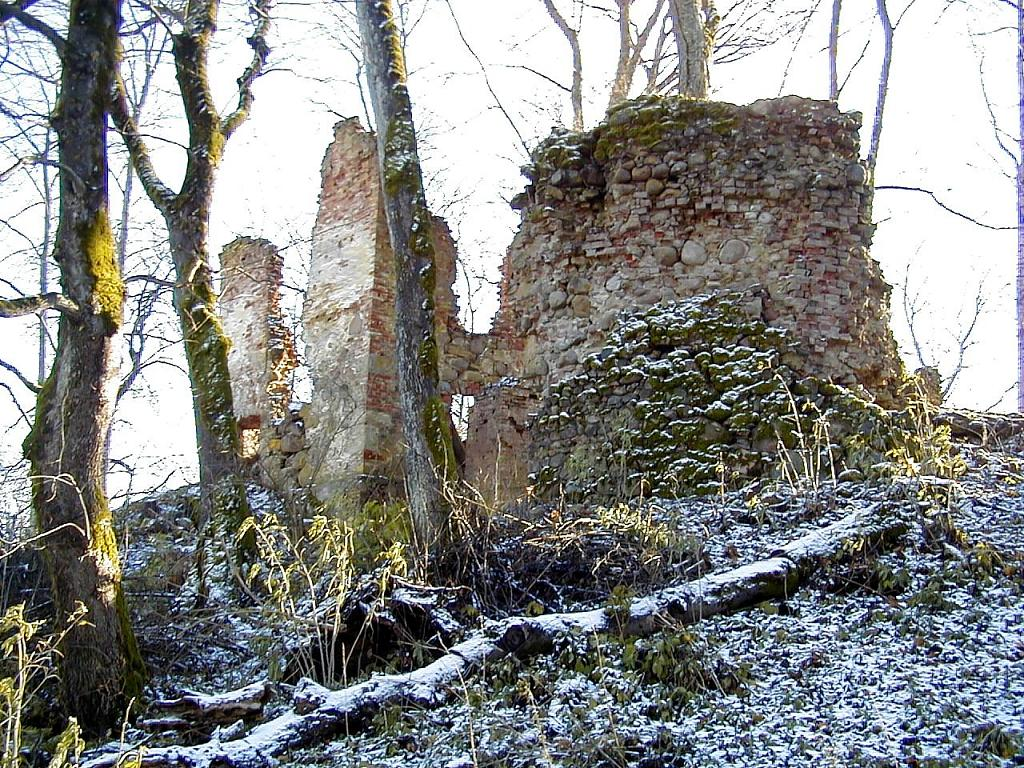
Embūte Castle ruins

Embūte (German: Amboten) is a village in Embūte Parish, South Kurzeme Municipality in the Courland region of Latvia. There are ruins of a bishop's castle built in 1265. The hilly area around the village is now part of a nature reserve.

== See also ==
- Embūte Castle
