= Pāvils Dreijmanis =

Latvian politician and architect

- Born: 4 February 1895; Jaundreimnaņi, Aloja parish, Kreis Wolmar, Governorate of Livonia, Russian Empire (now Limbaži Municipality, Latvia)
- Died: 21 August 1953 (aged 58); Adelaide, Australia
- Known for: Architecture
- Movement: Art Deco, Functionalism
- Awards: Order of Three Stars; Cross of Recognition

Pāvils Dreijmanis (4 February 1895, Aloja, Russian Empire – 21 August 1953, Adelaide, Australia) was a Latvian architect and recipient of the Cross of Recognition medal and the Order of the Three Stars.

== Career ==
By the age of 40, Dreijmanis was already a well-established mature architect. He had studied in Gatchina, Russia, then at the Civil Engineering Institute in Saint Petersburg. He was called up for military service and sent to study at the War Engineering School in Petrograd. In 1917 he graduated from the school and served in the Imperial Russian Army. After demobilisation he settled at his father's farm in Aloja village. On the day Latvia was declared an independent state, Dreijmanis volunteered for service at the Ministry of War and fought in the Latvian War of Independence. He served in the student's company, later in the 3rd Jelgava Infantry Regiment.

After the liberation battles, Dreijmanis resumed his studies and in 1923 graduated from the Faculty of Architecture at the University of Latvia. In 1926 he filled the position as chief architect of Riga, and beginning the same year he was chairman of the Riga Construction Board. He began teaching at the Riga State Technical School and sat on various construction and building boards. In exile after the war, he worked freelance as a professor at the Baltic University in Pinneberg, Germany, then moved to Australia and settled in Adelaide.

== Art Deco ==
Art Deco was a fashionable trend in architecture of the late 1920s and early 1930s. The basic characteristic of the style is the play of broken lines and angular shapes. In Europe it can be traced only here and there. Some elements of Art Deco can be seen in D. Zariņš' work and Maydell's bank building at 4, Doma Square (1926), the entrance and transaction hall of which were renovated 1994. A few of Teodor Hermanovskis' and Paul Mandelstamm's buildings bear features of Art Deco as well. The style would have passed Riga unobserved, except that Dreijmanis became captivated by it.

Almost everything Dreijmanis built is of lasting value. The first commissioned work of Dreijmanis was the movie theatre Palladium (1925). It was located in the yard of a residential house at 21, Marijas Street (1910, by architects Edgar Friesendorff and O. Lansky). The dramatic image of the movie hall has only been preserved in the memories of the older generation and in some old photographs since it was burned down completely during the war. After the war the movie theatre was altered and reconstructed several times, and its appearance has been changed completely. Dreijmanis had interpreted ethnographic motifs in the Art Deco style and he decorated the building in a supremely competent way.

From 1926 to 1930 a large school was built at 9, Miglas Street. A carefully balanced rhythm of Art Deco pilasters visually lighten the surface of the monumental volumes; the entrances are moulded in the Art Deco style as well. In 1926 the Riga City Council began to react to the local housing crises. Dreijmanis achieved the significant role of building five residential houses at 136/138, Ropažu Street and 11 houses at 40, Liepājas Street. All of them were terraced two-storey houses, comprising 6 flats each. The entrance hall, the kitchen, the living-room and the bathroom facilities were located on the ground floor; the bedrooms — on the second floor. This type of planning was an innovation in Latvia. Ethnographic motifs fused with Art Deco forms can be discerned in the architectural finish of these houses.

The residential house at 3, Ausekļa Street (1927) is the most impressive Art Deco building of Dreijmanis' creative legacy and in Latvian architecture in general. It was the first residential house commissioned by the Riga City Council. The building comprises 117 one-room, two-room or three-room flats and includes a kindergarten. The facades towards the yard with horizontal fenestration are among the earliest examples of Functionalism in Riga. The angular outlines of the projections of the staircases bear some resemblance to Art Deco. The expressive Art Deco facades towards Sakaru Street are on the qui vive. The building is decorated with several sculptures by Richard Maur. Broken relief friezes bend the arches of the passages. The axis of the passage diverges slightly from the axis of the one on the opposite side of Sakaru Street. It leads to the inner yard of the Forburg — a block of houses built according to the integral development plan of 1913. The street and inner spaces of the block are integral parts of the total cityscape.

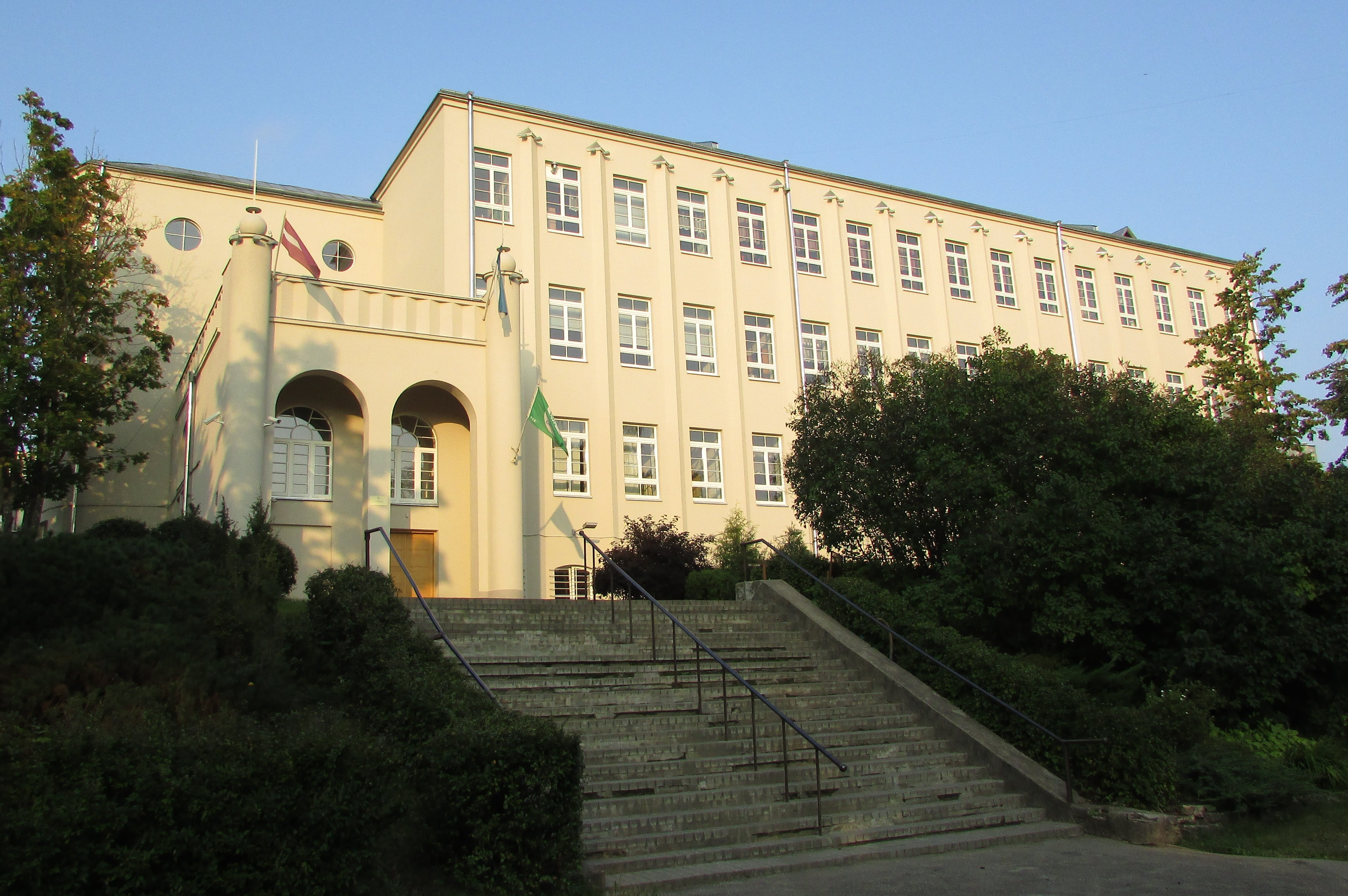
Riga Secondary school No.19, Miglas street 9 (1926-1930)

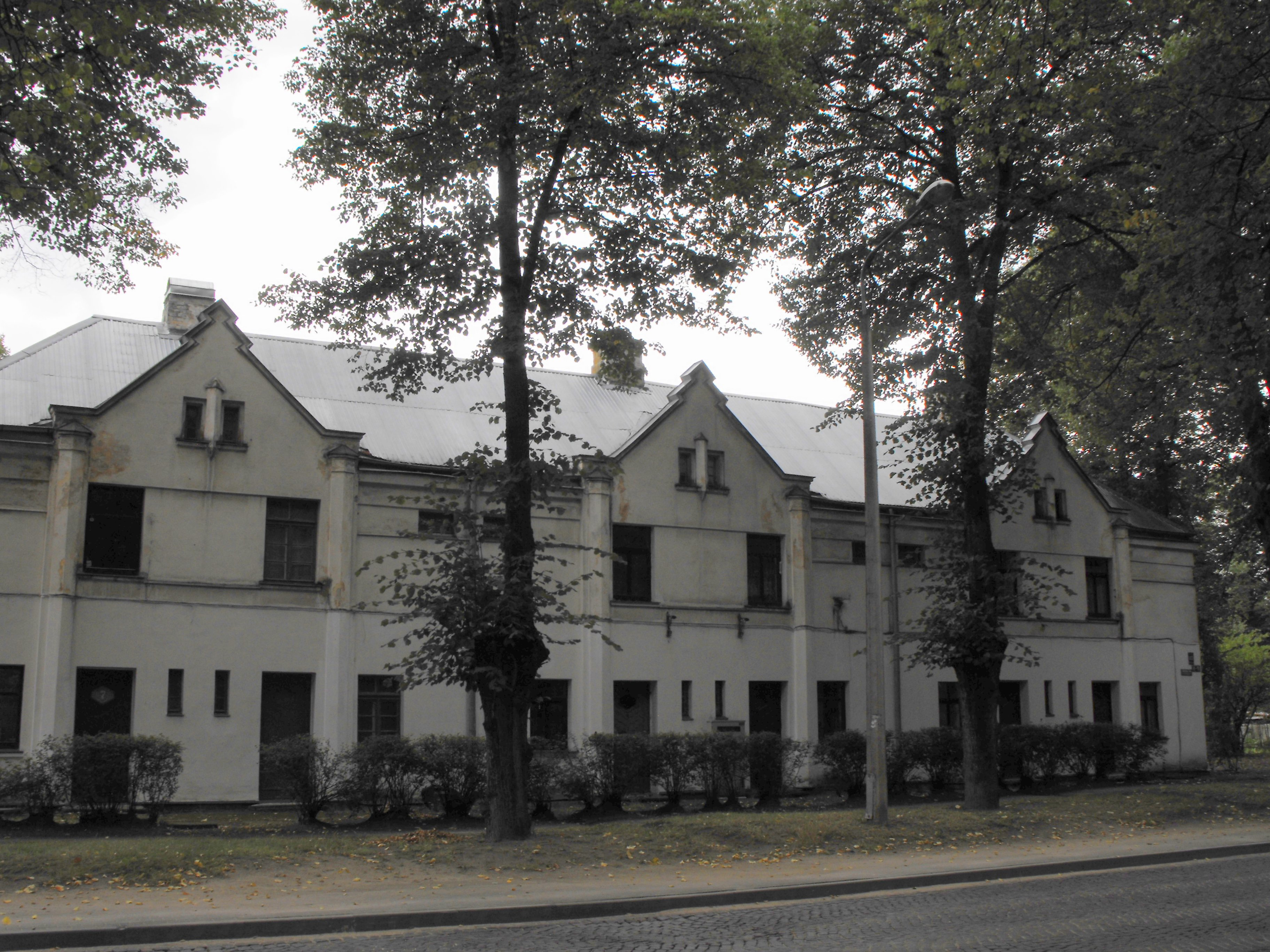
Terraced residential houses at Liepājas street 40

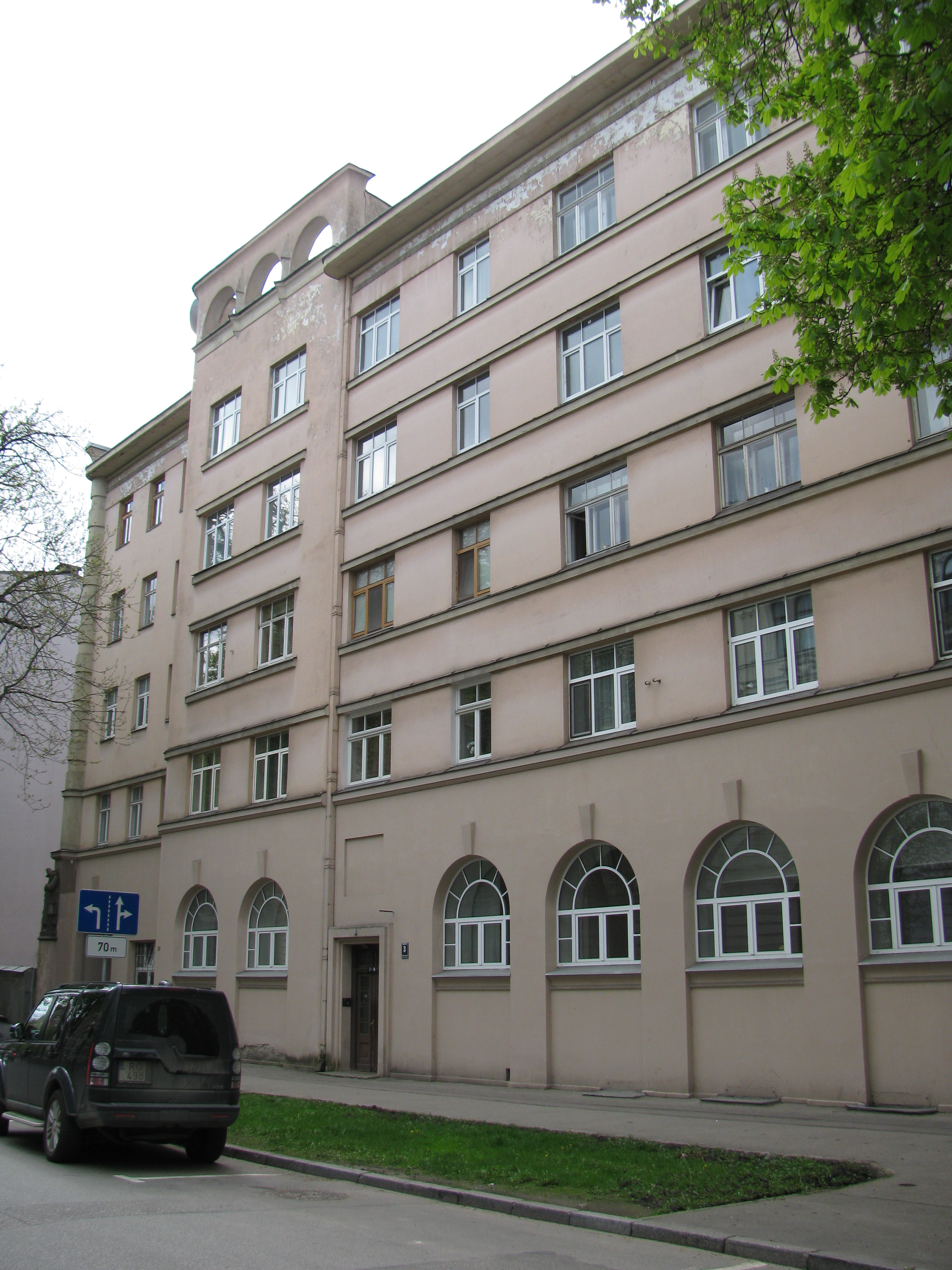
Residential house at Ausekļa street 3 (1927)

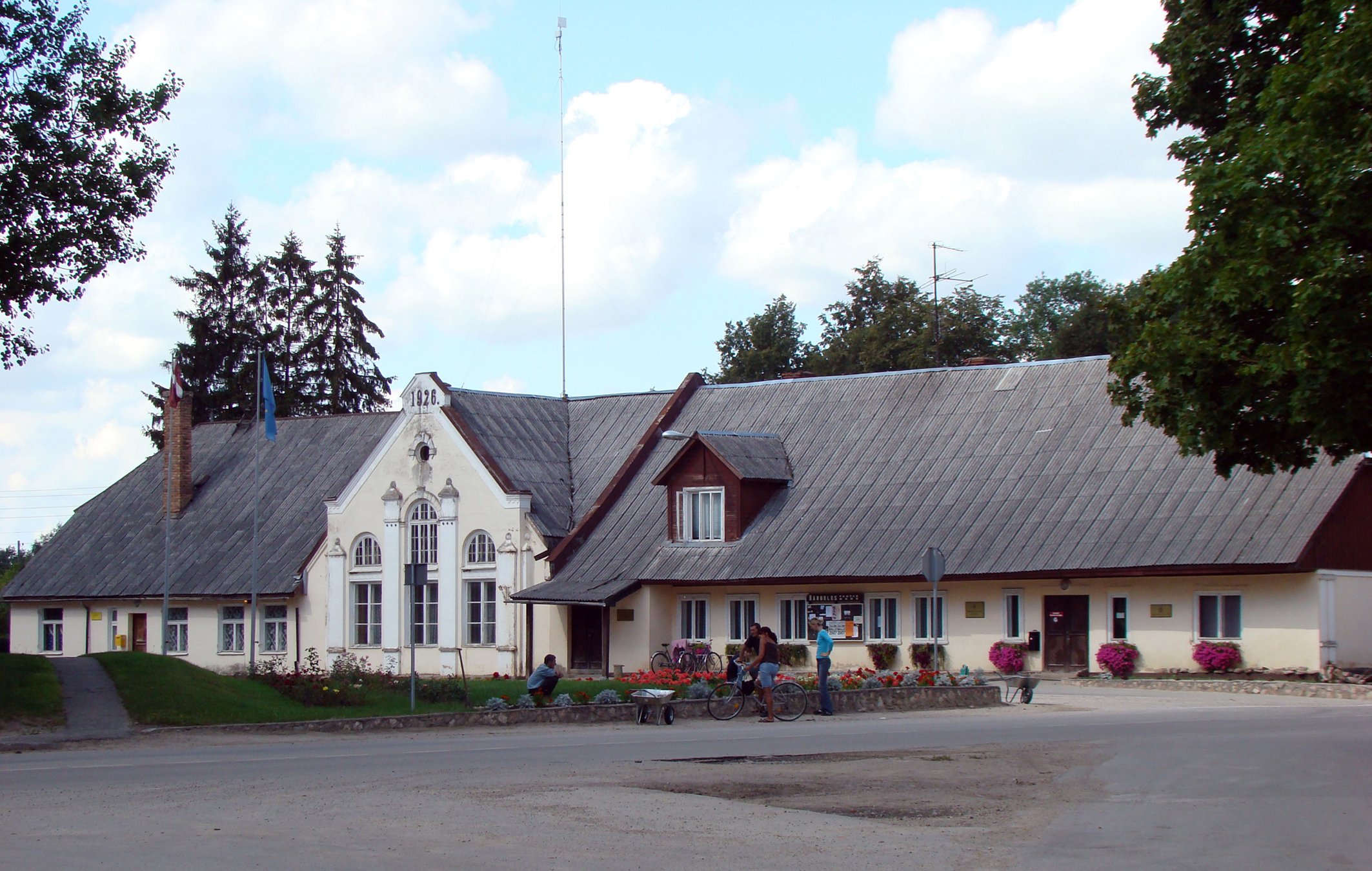
Building of the Agricultural Society Tīrums, Bārbele, Vecumnieki Municipality. (1926)

== Riga Central Market ==
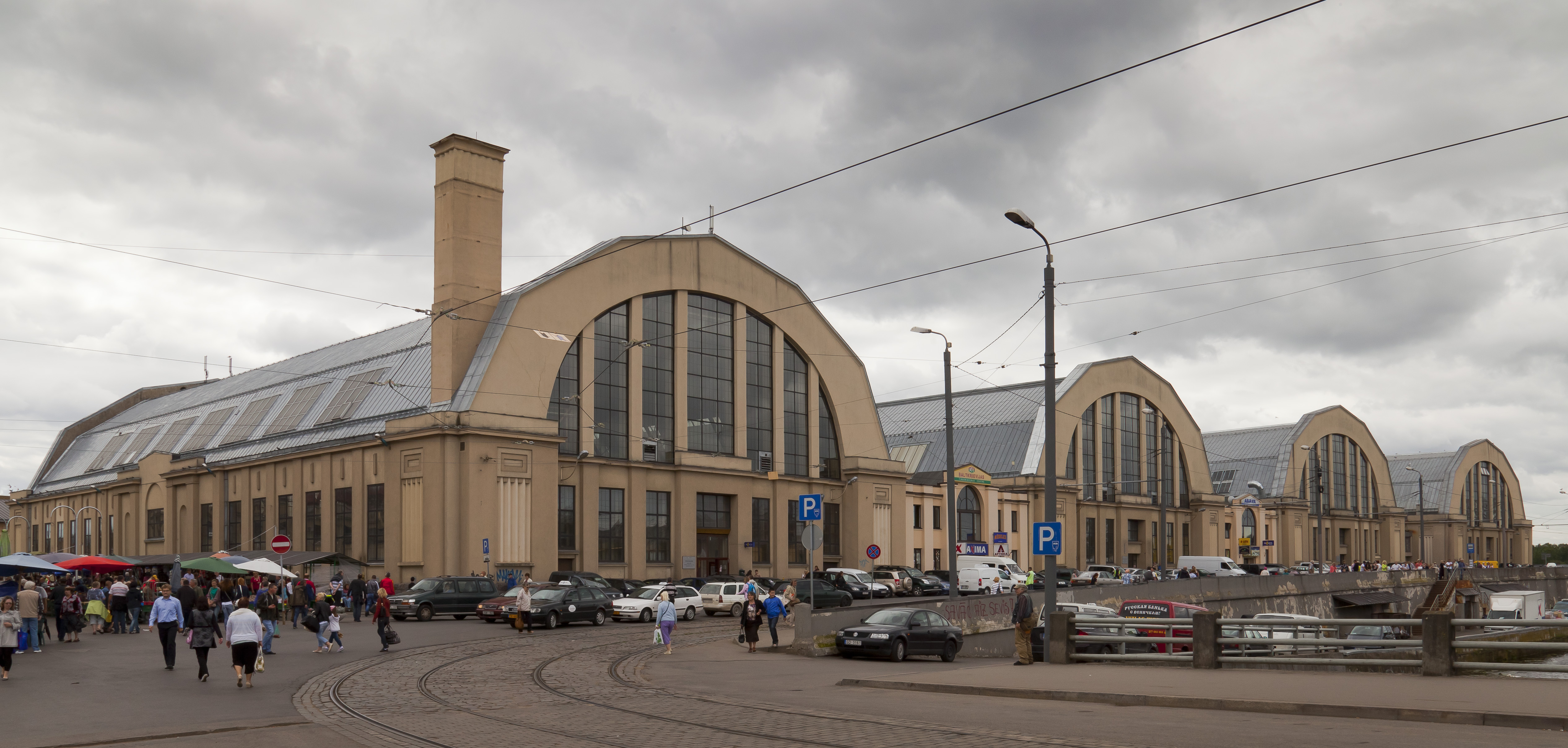
Central Market, Riga

Dreijmanis largest project was the design of Riga Central Market that was then the biggest complex of its kind in Europe. For the construction of the new market, airship hangars were obtained and a competition announced in 1923. The young architect Dreijmanis was among the winners. A market construction office was set up. A detailed design was worked out by the architect A. Pavlov (later he had a large practice in Rēzekne), and the civil engineers V. Isajev and G. Tolstoy. Dreijmanis continued as a consultant during the subsequent building process.

Riga Central Market is a modern trading complex with vast cold store refrigerators in the basement. Three levels were planned for the retail of commodities. Even to this seemingly impersonal architecture of a market, Dreijmanis managed to add several artistic finishing details, which reflect the Art Deco style of the time. The corner mouldings of the pavilions are not only ornamental, but also respond to the tectonics of the building.

== Besides Riga ==
Outside Riga Dreijmanis built a primary school in Allaži (1925), a country club in Ļaudona (1924), designed a country club in Ropaži as well. In the 1930s Dreijmanis built very little, but had strong influence on the development of architectural styles in Latvia. His contributions to newspapers and journals were pointed, sometimes even critical, and for that reason they were effective. Being a strict opponent to any superficial, formal experiments, he often expressed his opinion on styles. For outstanding public service Pāvils Dreijmanis was awarded the Atzinības krusts medal and the Order of the Three Stars.

== Chess player ==
Dreijmanis has been known as chess enthusiast and player. After the World War I, he was one of the Riga chess club founders. In 1924 he participated in the first Latvian Chess Championship, in which he shared 7th-8th place (Hermanis Matisons won).

== Sources ==
- Krastiņš, Jānis (2002). Rīgas arhitektūras meistari 1850-1940 : The masters of architecture of Riga 1850-1940 (in Latvian and English). Riga: Jumava. ISBN 9984-05-450-0. OCLC 52258305.
