= Embūte Castle =

Castle ruins in Latvia

- Courland, Latvia
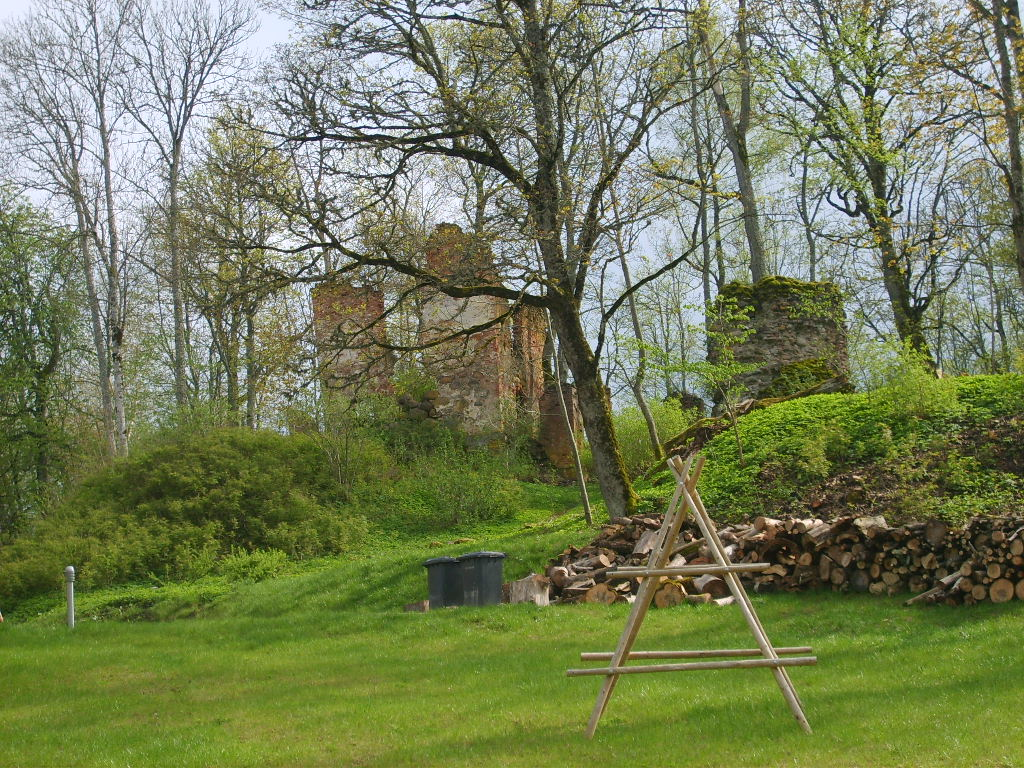

Site information
- Type: Castle
- Condition: Ruins

Location
- Coordinates: 56°30′18″N 21°49′06″E

Site history
- Built: 1265
- Built by: Konrad von Mandern
- Materials: stone

The ruins of Embūte Castle are located in Embūte (German: Amboten), Embūte Parish, South Kurzeme Municipality in the Courland region of Latvia, not far from an ancient hillfort erected by Curonians. It was an ancient Curonian settlement and is mentioned in ancient chronicles as a place with strong Curonian resistance to German crusaders. The bishop's castle was built as a border castle with Lithuania by Livonian Order on a steep hill on the right bank of the Lanka river, which flows into left tributary of the Venta. Later manor house was built using the walls of the former castle, which can be seen in the division of the rooms and the building material. Today, the ruins are surrounded by trees and are in poor condition.

== History ==
Embūte has been known since the end of 1244, when the Curonian wooden castle (German: Amboten) was taken over by the master of the Livonian Order Dietrich von Grüningen. In 1245 during war with Livonian Order, castle was attacked by the Grand Duke of Lithuania Mindaugas, but it was not taken. According to the chronicle of Herman Wartberg in 1253 castle was given to the Bishop of Courland. It came in the hands of the Livonian Order for a short period, but in the end of the thirteenth century it again belonged to the bishop. In 1265 master of the Livonian Order Konrad von Mandern built a stone castle 0.5 km south of the former Curonian wooden castle as a border castle with Lithuania.

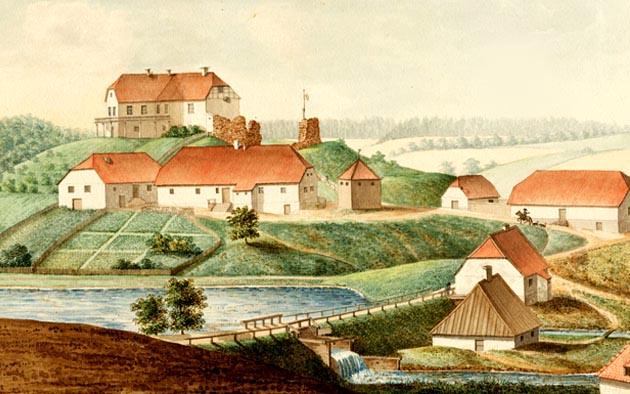
Embūte Manor in 1830. The ruins of the Embūte Episcopal Castle are also present.

Since the 16th-century castle was unused and was repurposed as manor house. In became a centre of big manor and residence for local German landlords.

In 1700 in course of the Great Northern War the castle was destroyed. Some documents from the 18th century tells, that only the castle walls has been preserved. In the same century a manor was erected on the old castle walls. It was expanded in the 19th century by demolishing one of the old gate towers.

The last owner of the castle was the widow of Hans von Hahn. In 1919 manor house was burned down by Bermontians. Local rumors says that the baroness burned the castle in 1920s to avoid it nationalization by the new Latvian government. During the agrarian reforms in Latvia (1921–1930) all manors and land was nationalized and divided by the Latvian government.

After the Second World War, the local Soviet kolkhoz used stones from the castle as building materials.

== Today's Castle ==
Embūte Castle ruins are situated far from the main road, in the sparsely populated region of Courland. Today's ruins are surrounded by trees and in quite bad condition. Only fragments of some walls and towers are visible.
