= Riga Central Market =

General market in Riga

Coordinates: 56.943710°N 24.114904°E

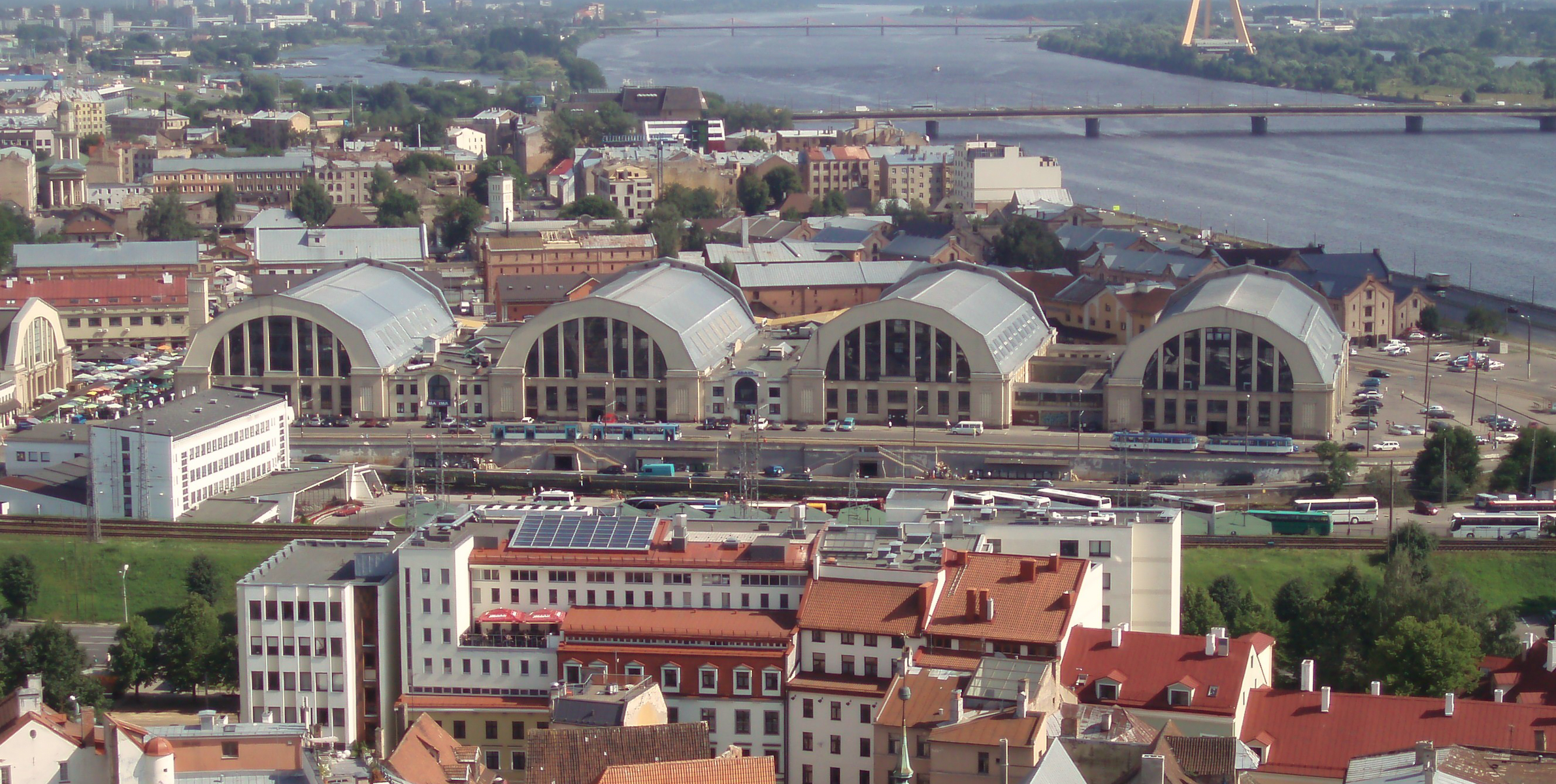
The aerial view of Riga Central Market's pavilions

Riga Central Market (Latvian: Rīgas Centrāltirgus) is Europe's largest market and bazaar in Riga, Latvia. It is one of the most notable structures from the 20th century in Latvia and has been included in the UNESCO World Heritage Site list together with Old Riga in 1998. It was planned from 1922 and built from 1924 to 1930. The main structures of the market are five pavilions constructed by reusing old German Zeppelin hangars and incorporating Neoclassicism and Art Deco styles. The market is 72,300 square metres (778,000 sq ft) wide with more than 3,000 trade stands.

The joint stock company Rīgas Centrāltirgus is currently owned by the Riga municipality, and the chairman of the board since 2010 is Anatolijs Abramovs.

== Overview ==
Currently, due to the rise of supermarkets, the market is showing similar trends and is seen as a cheap shopping place in Riga, however Riga City Council has expressed priority of preserving the market's mission and cultural value. The main goal of the company's board of directors is increase of customer flow throughout the market. They noted that among the problems is petty theft, customer deceit, and homeless people. Administration has determined to take tough measures on sellers that are deceiving customers. In 2009 market renovation plans were proposed and plans conceived in 2010. There are also future plans to join nearby train and bus station into a single complex as well as increase selling of national produce.

== History ==
=== Construction ===
Street view of Riga Central Market's pavilions in 1930s soon after its opening.

Produce has been sold on the banks of Daugava since 1571 and in 1863 trade-stand rows were built. On December 18, 1922, Riga City Council decided to move the crowded and highly unsanitary Daugavmala Market to a new enclosed location in conformity with hygienic and economic requirements. The market's plan was selected in an international competition. One of the highest prizes was received by Riga's architect Pāvils Dreijmanis and engineer S. Žitkovs collaborative proposal to reuse metal frameworks from World War I German Zeppelin hangars Walhalla and Walther, which had been used at Vaiņode Air Base. The initial large-structure design was impractical due to their size and weather conditions and the new buildings only used the top parts of the hangar design. The buildings themselves were constructed from stone and reinforced concrete.

The construction started in June 1924 and finished in autumn 1930, taking seven years instead of the planned five as construction halted during 1926–1928, due to financial problems. The development was overseen by the city council's marketing department head Klāvs Lorencs. The overseeing architects were Pāvils Dreijmanis and P. Pavlovs together with engineers V. Isajevs and G. Tolstojs. The construction was carried out by the stock company "Construction" (Latvian: a/s "Būve"), and market's construction office under the supervision of V. Isajevs. The city of Riga paid nearly 5 million roubles to the state property commission. This was at the time the biggest project in Europe spanning 57,000 square metres (610,000 sq ft). Five pavilions were envisioned with the largest 5,000 square metres (54,000 sq ft) hangar for wholesale and meat processing and smaller ones for retail. Four of them are located side by side and the biggest, fifth, was built perpendicular to them. All buildings had modern central heating and electric lighting. The complex was built in Art Deco style. A wide basement was built under the hangars for storage. Up to 310,000 kilograms (680,000 lb) of goods could be stored in the 27 freezers in 1938. In 1961, during Soviet time, almost 700 metric tons (690 long tons; 770 short tons) of goods could be stored. The products were moved topside with cranes without disturbing traffic and sellers. The basement has three tunnels connecting to the adjacent river bank. Retail sales began November 10, 1930, the same day Daugavmala Market closed. Even before the opening, hangars were used for various expositions and shows during the first half of the year.

Although the Central Market was three times the size of the Daugavmala Market, the majority of space was occupied by offices, warehouses and basements. The rent per square meter exceeded that of other markets and locations. Retail sellers could not afford the rent, and wholesale merchants could not place their workers. This gave rise to high prices. This was solved by making an open-air 1,370 square metres (14,700 sq ft) roofed porch, with a capacity for 170 horse teams. In 1938 a separate horse stable opened. In 1936 the most modern bird slaughterhouse in the state opened.

Juris Dambis, head of the State Inspection for Heritage Protection, says "When Riga Central Market was first opened on November 2, 1930, it was the largest and most progressive marketplace on earth." During the 1930s, the market pavilions were one of the main tourist attractions. A wide and cheap array of produce was available for degustation. Tourists from Germany and England especially appreciated the butter and bacon. The fish pavilion was especially attractive with large, colourful aquariums. The large number of tourists furthered the Central Market's reputation as one of the more grandiose buildings in Europe.

=== During occupations ===
The market was not affected by the first Soviet occupation in 1940. However, the Nazi German occupation lasted for three and a half years. Farmers were not allowed to freely sell their produce and were forced to supply the German Army and the market sold only limited amounts. Beginning September 1, 1941, food cards were required for purchase. During these years first roof repairs were carried out on May 30, 1942. The market's territory was readjusted to be suitable for war times. The two pavilions closest to the Daugava were converted into housing the German 726th supply unit's vehicle engine repair shop. A fire hazardous lumber storage was set nearby to necessitate Opel. Three repair shop office barracks were planned, but only one was active prior to the 1944 Soviet Union occupation.

During the Soviet occupation, the market was renamed Central Kolkhoz Market (Latvian: Centrālais Kolhozu tirgus) in 1949. The Soviet press praised the market as one of the best markets in the Soviet Union. In 1950 nine out of ten farms were unified in kolkhozes during the agriculture collectivisation and by 1961 the majority of goods were supplied collectively by 60 kolkhozes. Daily about 50-70 thousand customers shopped at the market — up to 100 thousand during weekends. 1961 market statistics showed sells of 200,000 metric tons (200,000 long tons; 220,000 short tons) of poultry, 768,000 litres (169,000 imp gal; 203,000 US gal) of milk, about 7 million eggs, and more than 22,000 metric tons (22,000 long tons; 24,000 short tons) of vegetables and fruits.

In the 1980s the market's ammonia based refrigerating plants were replaced with freon machinery. The low-pressure steam heating system was swapped with a connection to the city's central heating system. In 1983 the fruit and vegetable pavilion caught fire, which spread to peat insulation and lasted for tens of hours. In 1987 rat problems were solved in the market.

=== Heritage ===
On October 18, 1983, the Latvian Soviet Socialist Republic's Council of Ministers announced the market as a cultural heritage site. Shortly after Latvia regained independence 1991, market director Leonīds Lapoško showed that the market was in dire condition, especially underground. On January 3, 1995, the city council established stock company Riga Central Market (Latvian: a/s Rīgas Centrāltirgus). In the next half year it merged with Riga Market Company (Latvian: Rīgas tirgus) to form a combined location between the central market's pavilions and outside street bazaar. In August 1998 Riga City Council rented the outside market territory until 2045.

In 1998 the market territory, together with Old Riga, were included in the UNESCO World Heritage Site list. The market's pavilions are five of nine Zeppelin hangars remaining in the world.

On January 15, 2019, the reconstructed Gastronomy Pavilion, which had been closed since the fall of 2016, was opened. The renovation of the gastronomy pavilion cost about 1.7 million euros.

== Architecture ==
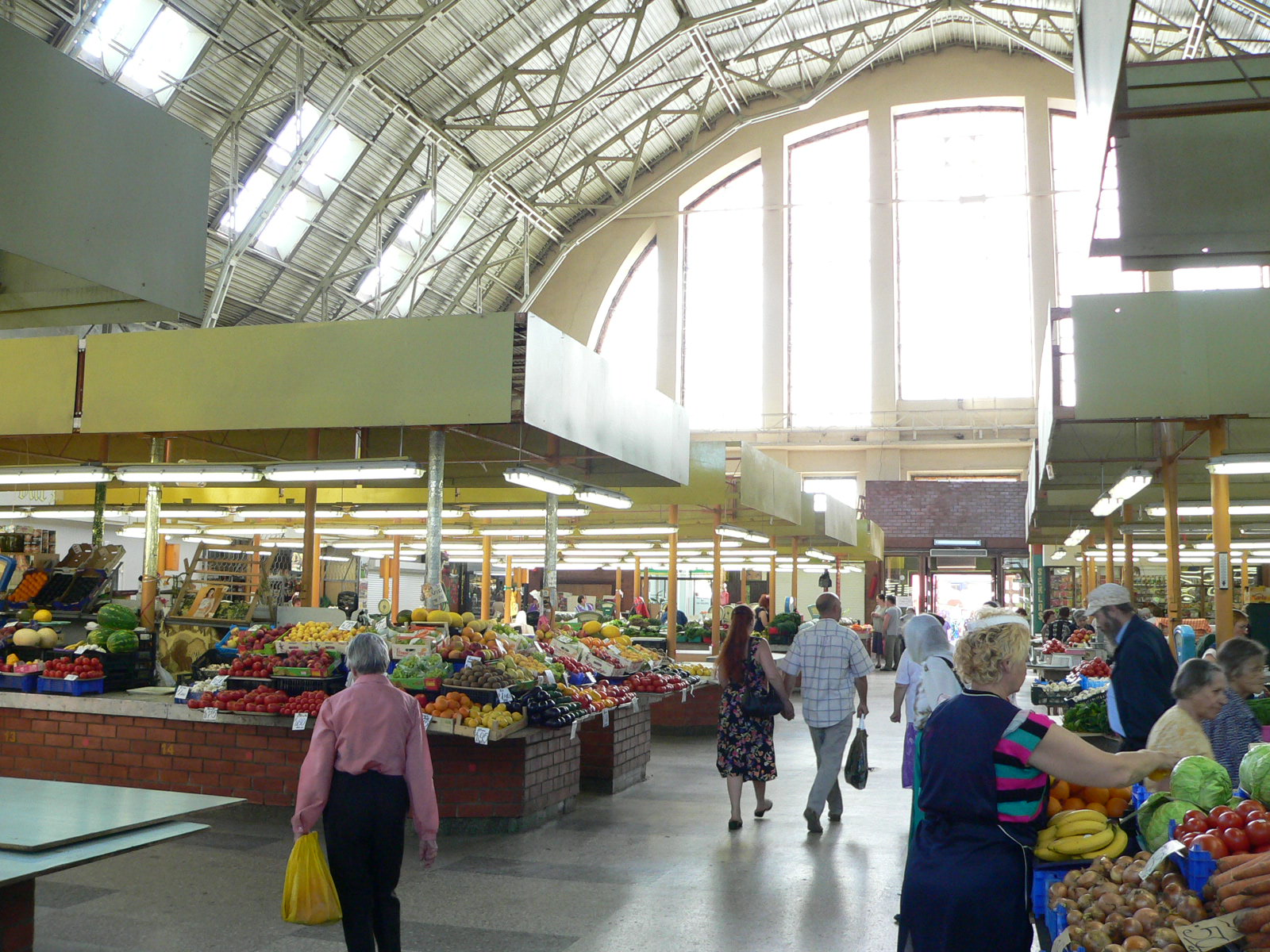
Inside one of the Riga Central Market's pavilions

The architecture was influenced by practical need as well as Neoclassicism. The Zeppelin hangars gave the pavilions their look and only certain parts could be accented with Art Deco style.
