= Vaiņode Air Base =

Former USSR air base

Vaiņode
- Vaiņode, Kuldīga Municipality in Latvia
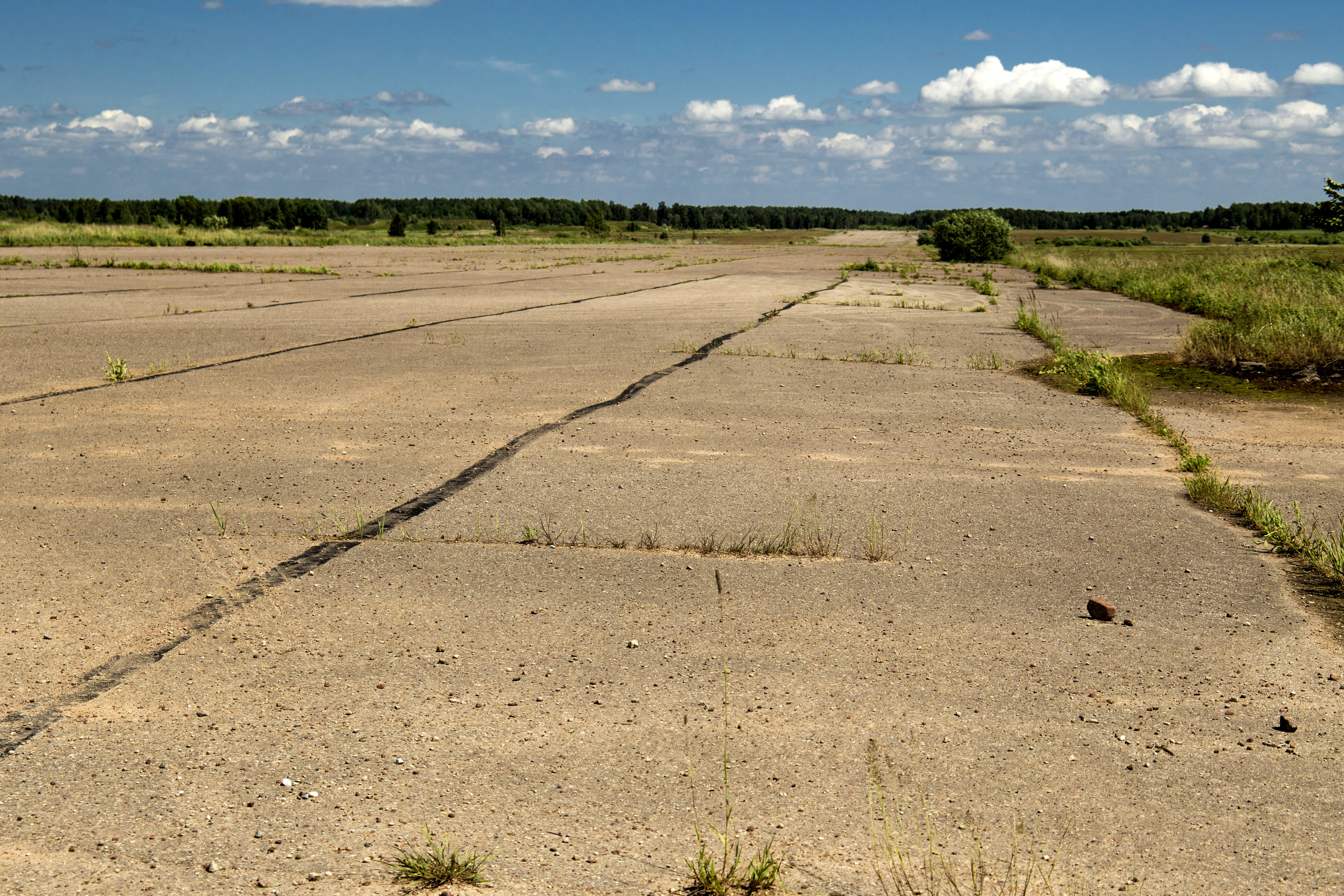

Site information
- Type: Air Base
- Owner: Latvian National Armed Forces
- Operator: Latvian Air Force

Location
- Shown within Latvia
- Coordinates: 56°24′22.9″N 021°53′22.4″E

Site history
- Built: 1945
- In use: 1945 - 1991

Airfield information
- Identifiers: ICAO: EVFA
- Elevation: 158 metres (518 ft) AMSL
Runways
Direction	Length and surface
08L/24R	2,500 metres (8,202 ft) Concrete
08R/24L	2,600 metres (8,530 ft) Concrete
- disused since 1991 after USSR military left, infrastructure destroyed.

Vaiņode (also somewhere written as Vainodo, Vainede, Vaynede, Vaynodo, and Toyvanede) is a former USSR air base in Latvia, located 31 kilometres (19 mi) south of Skrunda. It was abandoned in 1993. It is only 4 kilometres (2 mi) from the border with Lithuania.

== History ==
During World War I it was a German airship base with two 240 metres (787 ft) long airship hangars. After the war, they were dismantled and parts of them reused as top cover of Riga Central Market's pavilion buildings. They are still in use today.

Vaiņode was home to the 54th Guards Fighter Aviation Regiment (54 Gv IAP), in 1967 flying some of the first Sukhoi Su-15 (ASCC: Flagon) aircraft ever fielded. These planes were upgraded to Sukhoi Su-27 (ASCC: Flanker) aircraft in the 1980s, and there is some evidence that Mikoyan-Gurevich MiG-23 (ASCC: Flogger) aircraft were flown. The 54th Regiment was withdrawn to Savasleyka in the Moscow Military District after 1990.

The 54th Guards IAP PVO was activated in May 1941 as the 237th Fighter Aviation Regiment (IAP) equipped with the Yakovlev Yak-1. On 3 February 1943 it became the 54th Guards IAP; "Kerch" designation from Apr 1944; 1944 equipped with Bell P-39 Airacobra, as part of the 1st Guards IAD; reequipped with Su-15 in 1967, Su-15TM from the 2nd half of the 1970s, and Su-27 from the 2nd half of the 1980s.

== Today ==
The site has been derelict since Latvian independence from the USSR in 1991. Part of the air base was demolished between 1995 and 1997. Some of the concrete plates were used to improve the infrastructure in Liepāja Port. Most of the area is a nature reserve.
