= Embūte Parish =

Parish of Latvia

- parish of Latvia
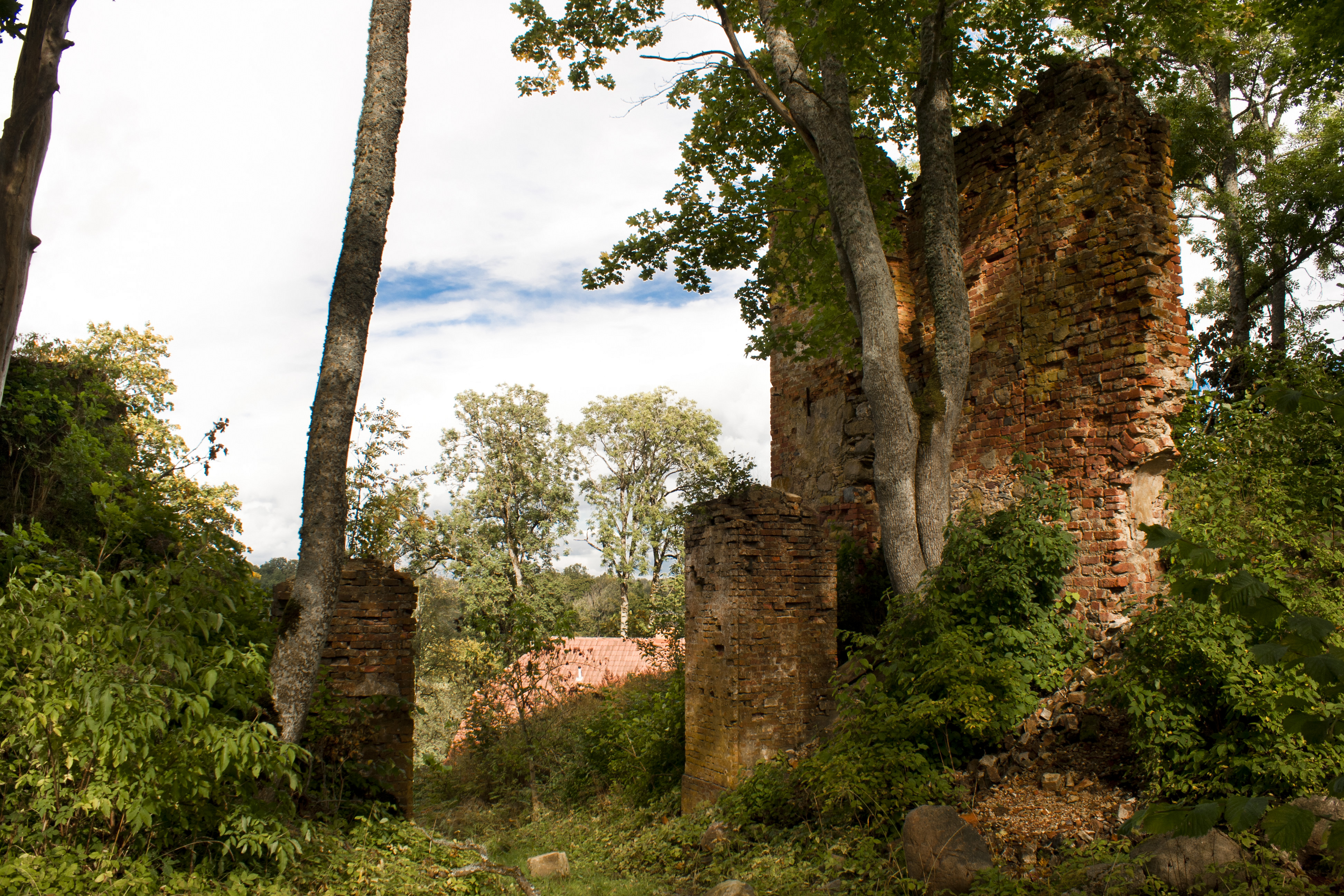

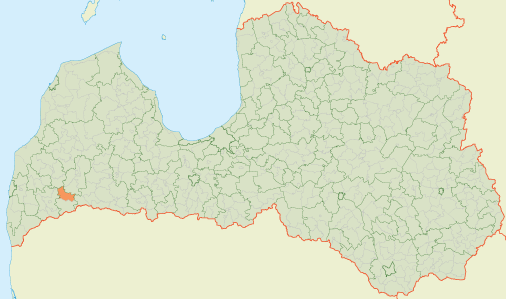
- 56°30′18″N 21°49′29″E
- Country: Latvia

Area
  - Total: 114.26 km^{2} (44.12 sq mi)
  - Land: 114.26 km^{2} (44.12 sq mi)
  - Water: 3.08 km^{2} (1.19 sq mi)

Population (1 January 2024)
  - Total: 286
  - Density: 2.5/km^{2} (6.5/sq mi)

Embūte Parish (Latvian: Embūtes pagasts) is an administrative unit of South Kurzeme Municipality in the Courland region of Latvia. The parish has a population of 414 (as of 1/07/2010) and covers an area of 117.6 km^{2}.

== Villages of Embūte parish ==
- Dēsele
- Dinsdurbe
- Embūte
- Vībiņi

== See also ==
- Embūte castle
