= Dienvidrietumu rajons (Liepāja) =

Neighbourhood of Liepāja, Latvia

Coordinates: 56°29′20″N 21°00′08″E

Dienvidrietumu rajons (Latvian: Dienvidrietumu rajons) or Southwestern region is one of the neighbourhoods of Liepāja, Latvia.

It is one of the modern neighborhoods of Liepāja, built in the 1960s. It is located near the southern border of the city, on the coast of the Baltic Sea.

== History ==
Between 1899 and 1908, southern fortifications were built south of the city between the Baltic Sea coast and the Pērkone canal. After 1934, the Southern Suburbs were formed, where the newly designed Saldus, Paurupe, Embūte, Kandava, Priekule, Tukums, Vaiņode, Svēte, Pape, Nida, Pampali, Usma, Dunika, Roja, Ciecere, Reina Forest, Industry, Ugāle, Sārnatu were named, Oars, Kalēta, Ilmāja, Kalvene, Rāvas, Gramzda, Dzērve, Ulmale, Amata, Tebra, Ķoniņu, Dunalkas, Rudbāržu streets, Venta and Daugava avenues. At present, Paurupe, Embūte, Kalēta, Ilmājas, Gramzdas, Aizputes and Gaviezes streets have disappeared from these.

After the Second World War in 1946, the city of Liepāja was divided into three administrative districts, which included Vecliepāja, Jaunliepāja and Ziemeļu rajons. The southern suburbs along the Klaipėdas highway and Ganību Street remained under construction for a long time until the city border.

At the beginning of the 1970s, the construction of a new residential array, which was called the Southwestern residential area, began, and on June 23, 1972, the Liepāja tram line was opened to Vaiņodes Street. In 1976, Liepāja A. Pushkin Secondary School No. 2 started working in a newly built building at Liedaga Street 5.

In 2005, only 8% of the total population of Liepaja lived in the South-West district, while 26% lived in Vecliepaja, 22% in the Ziemeļu priekšpilsēta, 16% in Ezerkrasts, 10% in Karosta, 6% in Tosmare, 8% in Jaunliepāja, 6% in the Zaļā birze. %, but in the Jaunā pasaule <1% of the total population. At that time, 35% of the population in the south-western district was of retirement age and had the lowest proportion of young people and children in Liepāja.

In 2013, the extension of the Liepāja tram line from the South-West District to Ezerkrasts was completed, envisaging a tram turn circle in the immediate vicinity of Liepājas ezers.
