= Mirdza Ķempe =

Soviet and Latvian poet, writer and translator

- Born: 9 February 1907; Liepāja, Russian Empire
- Died: 12 April 1974 (aged 67); Riga, Latvian SSR, Soviet Union
- Occupations: Writer, poet, translator
- Spouse(s): Eriks Ādamsons, Linards Naikovskis

Mirdza Ķempe (later Naikovska) (9 February [O.S. 27 January] 1907 – 12 April 1974) was a Soviet and Latvian poet, writer and translator. She was a recipient of the State Prize of Latvian SSR (1958), USSR State Prize (1967), and the Order of the Red Banner of Labour.

== Biography ==
Mirdza Ķempe was born into a working-class family in Liepāja, Latvia. From 1914 to 1926, she lived in Tosmare at Ģen. Baloža st., 47; later she and her family lived at Bernatu st., 41 in Liepāja. In 1915–1919, she studied at the 1st Liepāja primary school (now the 5th Liepāja school). Ķempe graduated from the 1st Liepāja secondary school in 1925. Her first verse, "Ne jums!", was published in the "Kurzemes Vārds" newspaper in 1923. In the same year, she translated Pushkin's Mozart and Salieri into the Latvian language. In 1927, she entered the University of Latvia in Riga. Because of lack of money she had to drop out of the university and in 1928 Ķempe started to work as a continuity announcer for Rīgas radiofons. In 1931, she married writer Eriks Ādamsons.

She translated works from Russian, English, German, Spanish and French. During World War II, she was evacuated to Moscow, Astrakhan and Ivanovo. She wrote plays, lyric miniatures and verses.

== Death and legacy ==
She was buried in Līvu cemetery in Liepāja.

On 9 February 1989 a monument to Mirdza Ķempe was opened in Liepāja (architect Ligita Ulmane), another in Riga. A street in Ezerkrasts district of Liepāja is named after her.

== Poetry ==
Mirdza Ķempe published 15 collections of poetry, including "Rīta vejš" (1946), "Gaisma akmenī", "Ērkšķuroze" (Dog-rose, 1972), "Mīlestības krāšņais", "Dzintara spogulis" (1968), "Mirkļu mužiba" etc.

Ne jums!

"Ne jums es vaicāšu: kas grēks, kas kauns?
Par velti draudiet man ar tumsas baismu!
Es pati savu dzīvi celšu –
Vienalga man, kur ceļam reiz būs gals..."

Manai Liepājai

"Jūras meita, Zemes māsa.
Mana Liepāja, ko mīlu.
Tavām acīm dzelmes krāsa,
Kurā atspīd debess dzīle."

== Awards and honours ==
She was awarded State Prize of Latvian SSR (1958), USSR State Prize (1967) and the Order of the Red Banner of Labour. In 1971 she received Visva-Bharati University honorary doctor diploma for her works on Urdu language.

== Selected works ==
- Кемпе, Мирдза (1982), Избранное. Стихотворения и лирические миниатюры, Moscow, RU: Художественная литература
- Ķempe, Mirdza (1981), Kopoti raksti. Pirmais sējums, Riga, LV: Liesma
