= Tosmare =

Neighbourhood of Liepaja, Latvia

Coordinates: 56°33′11″N 21°02′51″E

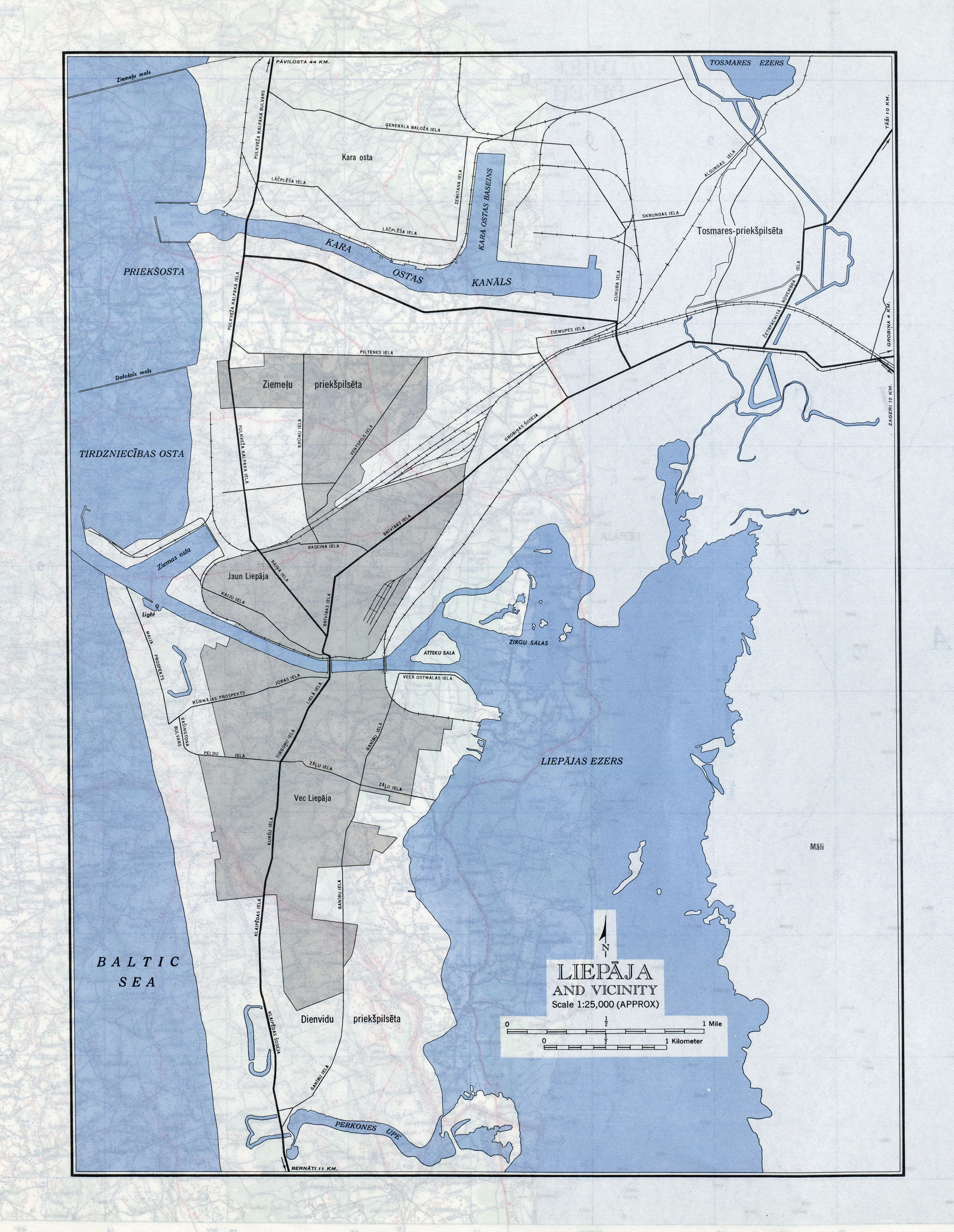
Tosmare shown as "Tosmares priekšpilsēta" [suburb], including the Zaļā birze neighbourhood, 1954 U.S. Army map

Tosmare is a district (neighbourhood) of Liepāja, Latvia near the neighbourhood of Karosta and Tosmare Lake. It is located in the north-eastern part of the city.

== Shipyard ==
Tosmare is well known mostly because of the Tosmare Shipyard (Liepāja Northern Shipyard since 2020) currently owned by SIA LZK (formerly by Rīgas kuģu būvētava). The shipyard was founded in 1900 and has two graving docks, and was used by the inter-war Latvian Navy.

== Notable residents ==
The Latvian poet Mirdza Ķempe lived here from 1914 to 1926.
