= Riga Shipyard =

Company based in Riga, Latvia

Coordinates: 57.028°N 24.121°E

JSC Riga Shipyard
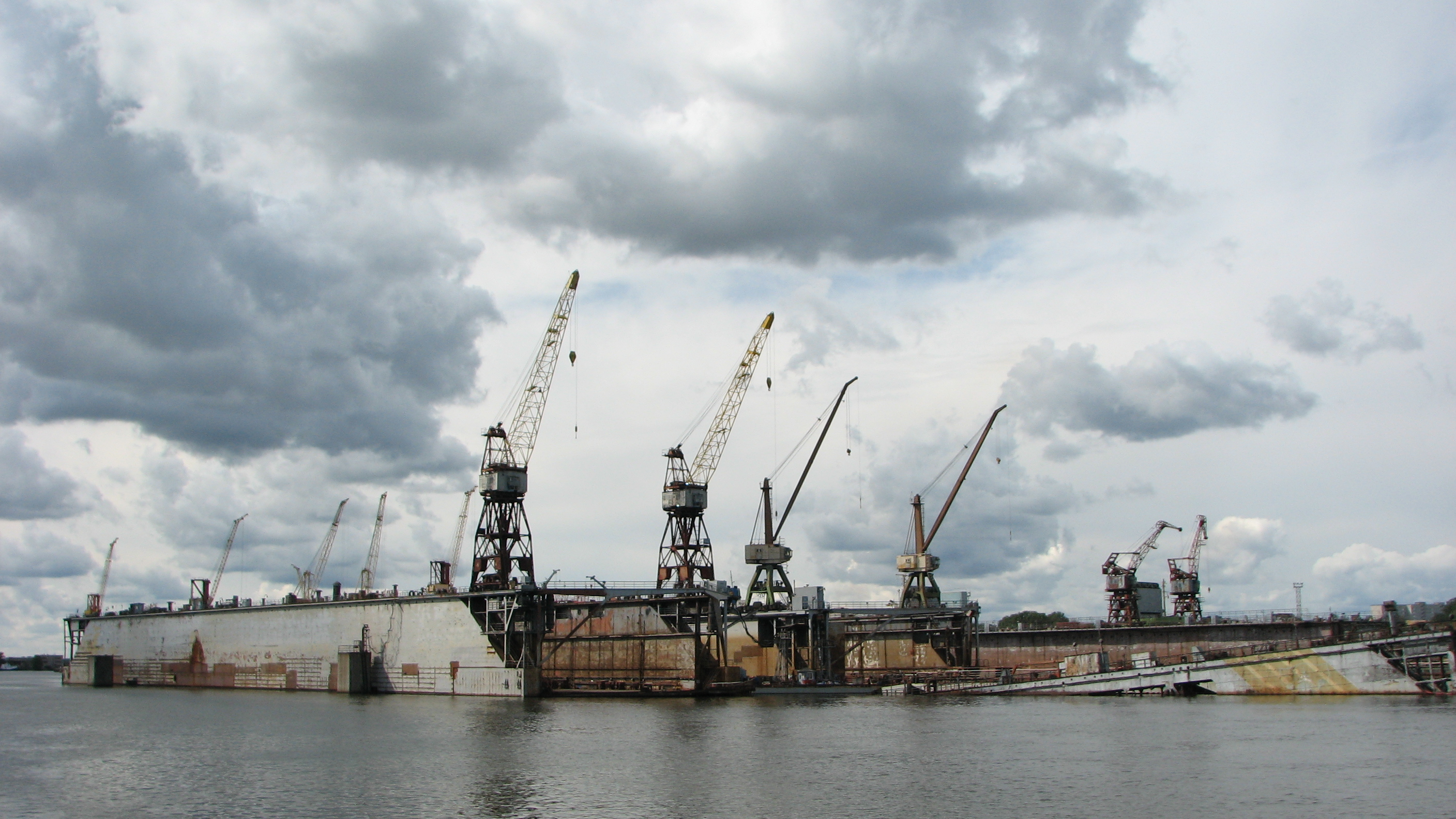
- Riga Shipyard dry docks in Vecmīlgrāvis
- Native name: Latvian: AS Rīgas kuģu būvētava
- Company type: Joint stock company
- Traded as: Nasdaq Baltic: RKB1R
- Industry: Shipbuilding, Metalworking
- Founded: 1913; 113 years ago
- Headquarters: Gāles iela 2, Riga, Latvia
- Area served: Europe
- Key people: Jānis Skvarnovičs (Chairman); Einārs Buks (CEO)
- Products: Patrol Boats, Fishing Vessels, Workboats, Ferries, Barges, Oil tankers, Tugboats
- Revenue: 1,674,927 euro (2022)
- Net income: 1,006,722 euro (2022)
- Total assets: 7,712,263 euro (2022)
- Number of employees: 38 (2022)
- Website: www.riga-shipyard.com

Riga Shipyard (Latvian: Rīgas kuģu būvētava) is a Latvian shipyard as well as one of the largest shipyards in the Baltic region. The shipyard has 9 berths, 3 docks and 2 slipways on the banks of Daugava river channels. The yard is capable to accommodate Panamax size vessels for dry-docking and Aframax size vessels for afloat repairs.

Established in 1913, the enterprise was decimated by both world wars, although revived both times afterwards. During the Soviet occupation, the shipyard was called the Riga Ship Repair Factory (Rīgas Kuģu remonta rūpnīca, RKRR). Riga Shipyard was privatized in 1995. The Riga Shipyard has repaired more than 100 seagoing vessels per year and has built more than 150 hulls, some partially outfitted, since 1997.

According to press, in 2013 suffered €1.6 mln losses in 2013 and €1.5 mln in 2014, almost going bankrupt in 2014. In 2020 Latvia's Financial and Capital Markets Commission (FKTK) fined the shipyard for violation of the Financial Instruments Market Law. According to the FKTK, the shipyard didn't provide audited financial statements for 2018 and interim financial statements for the first nine months of 2019. The shipyard was ordered to immediately provide all the necessary documents.

Among the vessels built by the Riga Shipyard are five Skrunda-class patrol boats for the Latvian Naval Forces (in cooperation with the German Abeking & Rasmussen shipyard). The contract was signed in 2007 and the last boat entered service in March 2014.

The football club FK Jūrnieks was originally founded as the shipyard's official team.

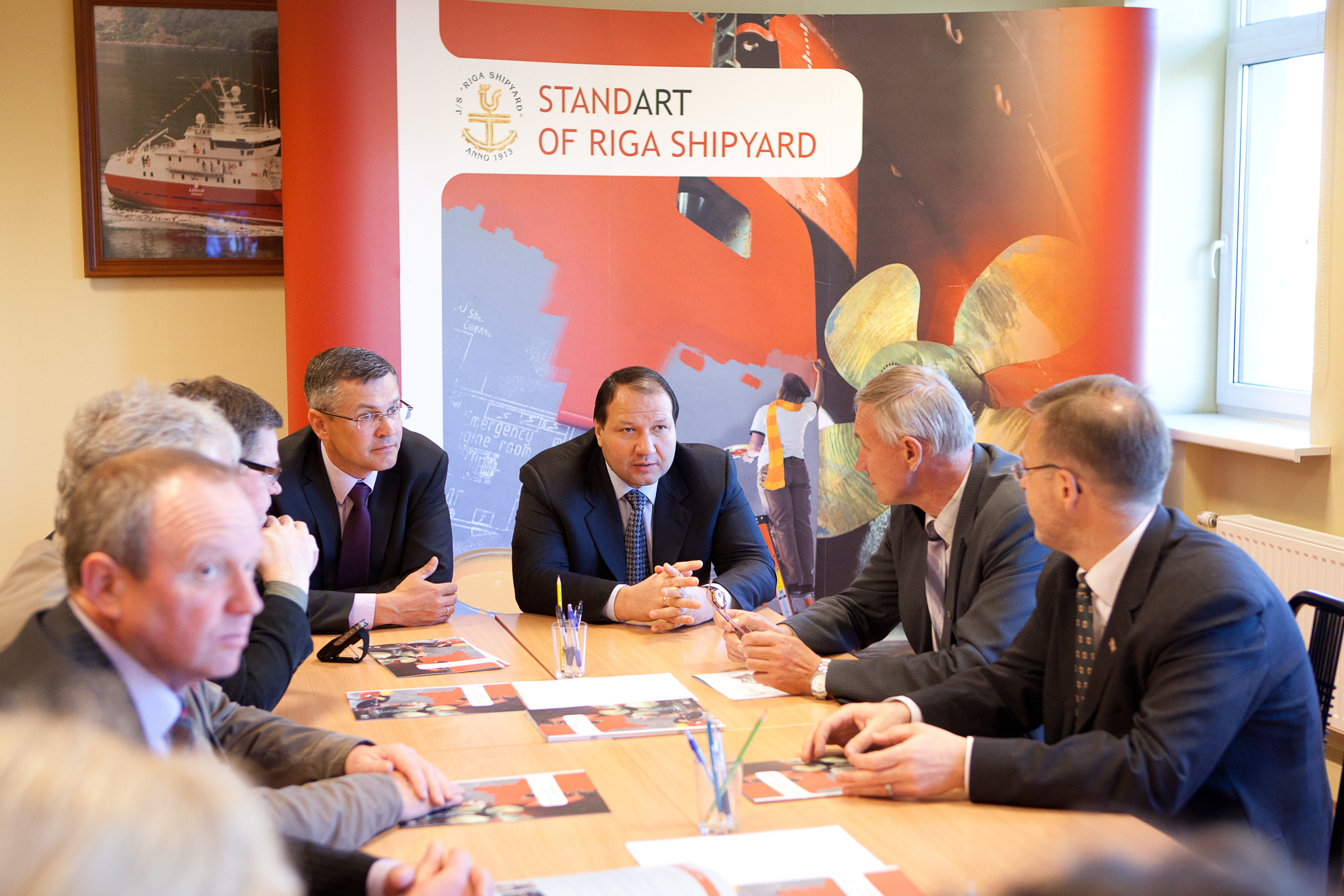
Members of the Saeima and former director Vasīlijs Meļņiks at the shipyard in 2011

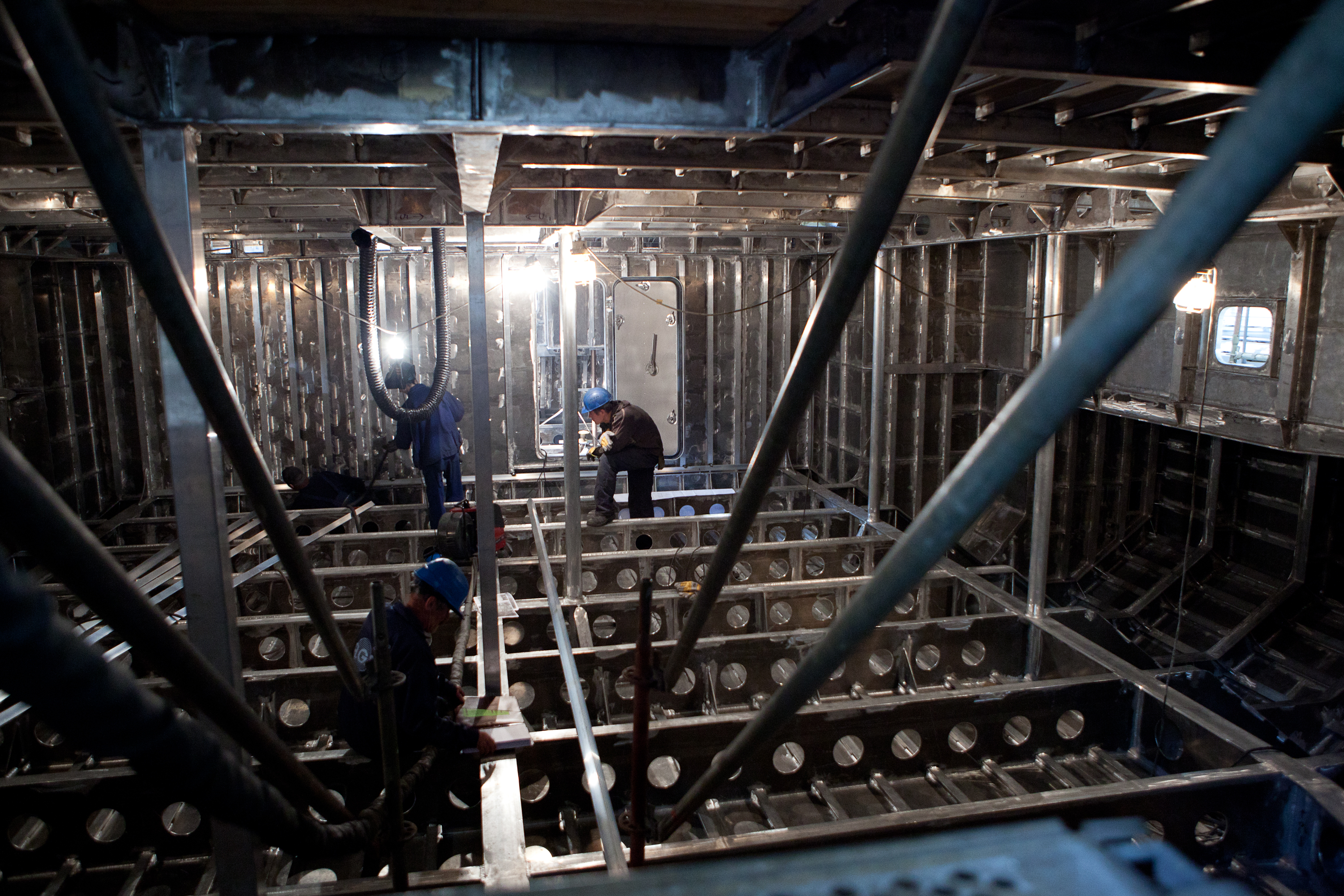
Work on a ship hull

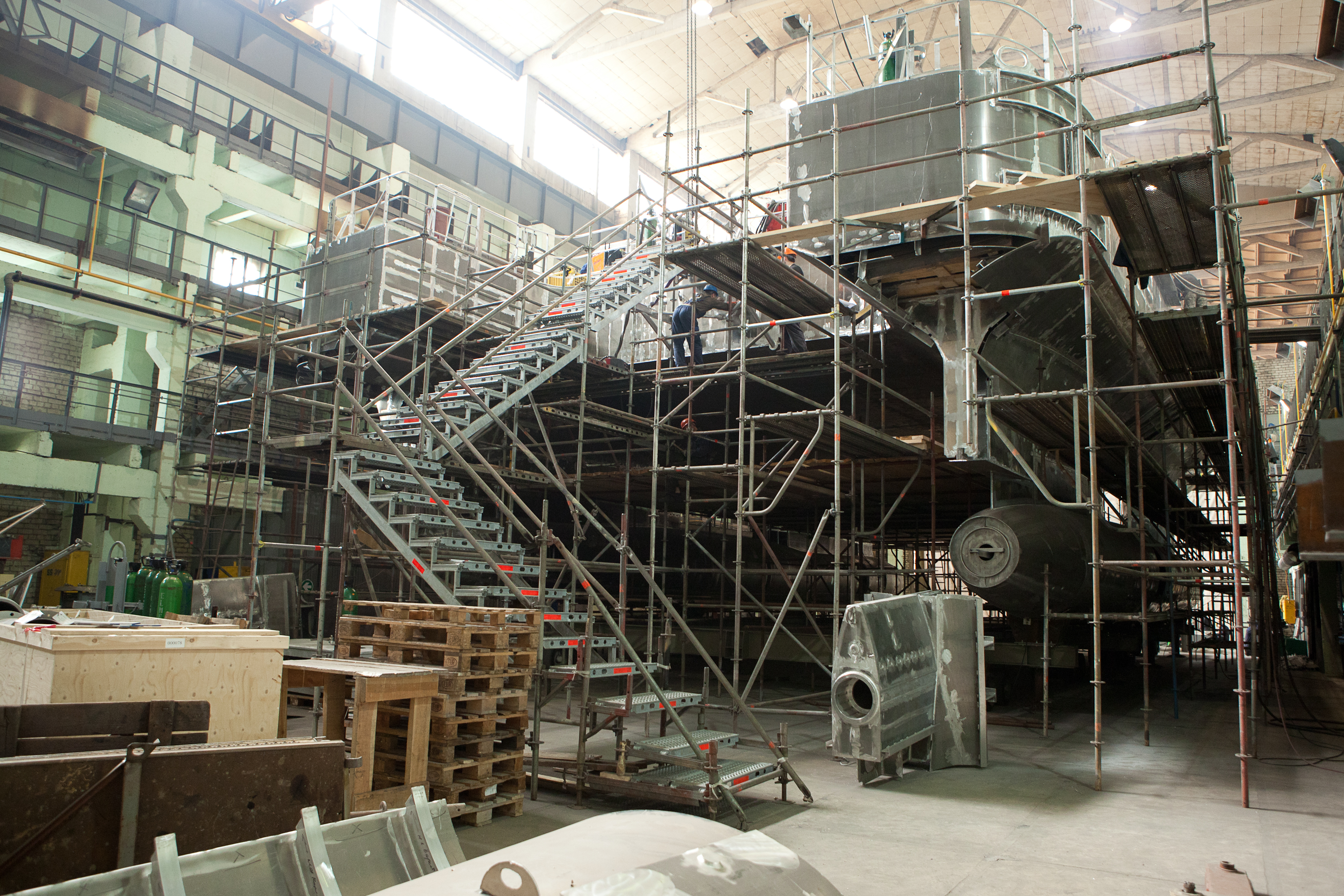
Inside the works

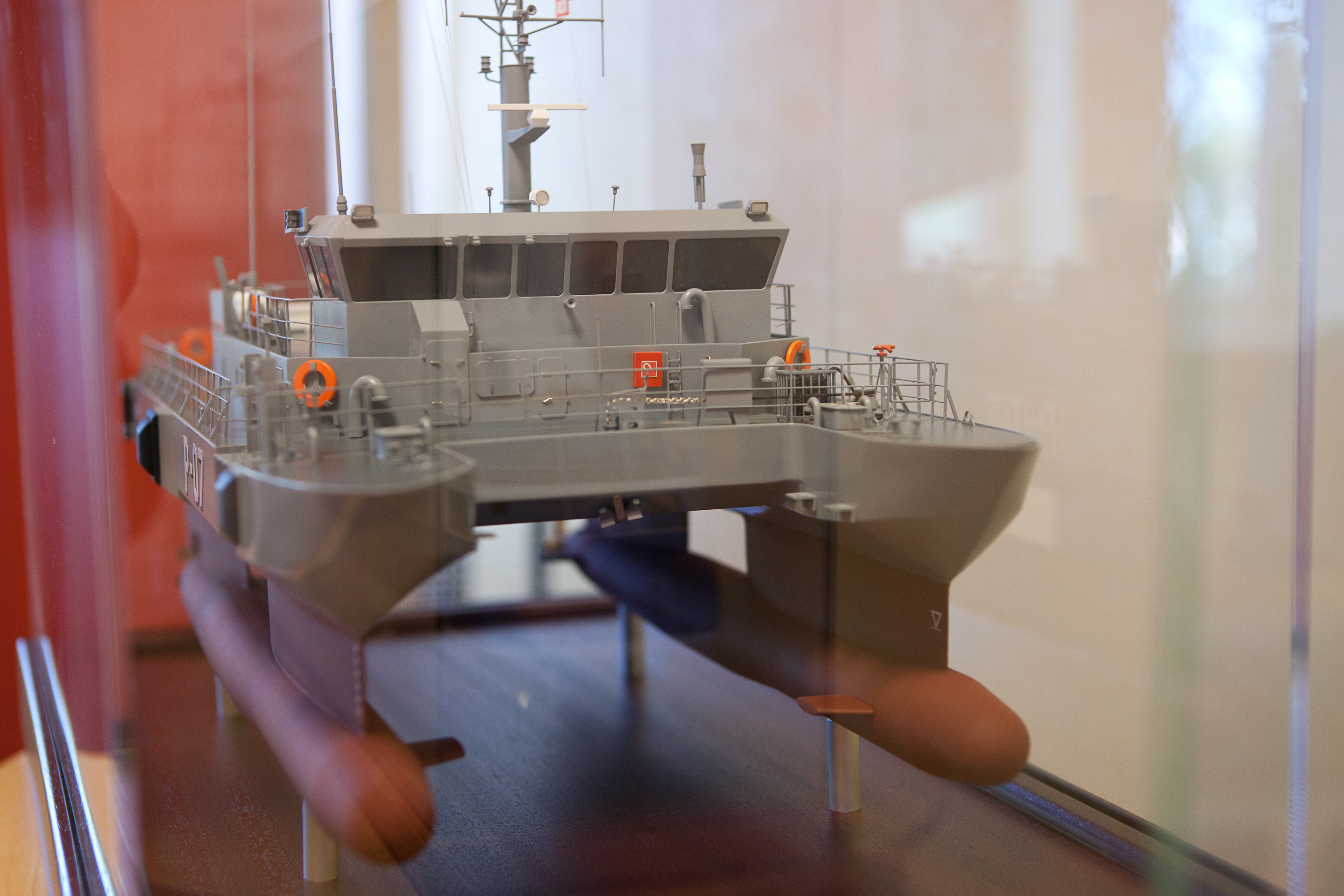
A scale model of a Skrunda-class patrol boat, built by the shipyard

== See also ==
- Baltic Workboats
- Tosmare Shipyard in Tosmare, Liepāja
