= Skrunda-class patrol boat =

SWATH patrol vessels of the Latvian Navy

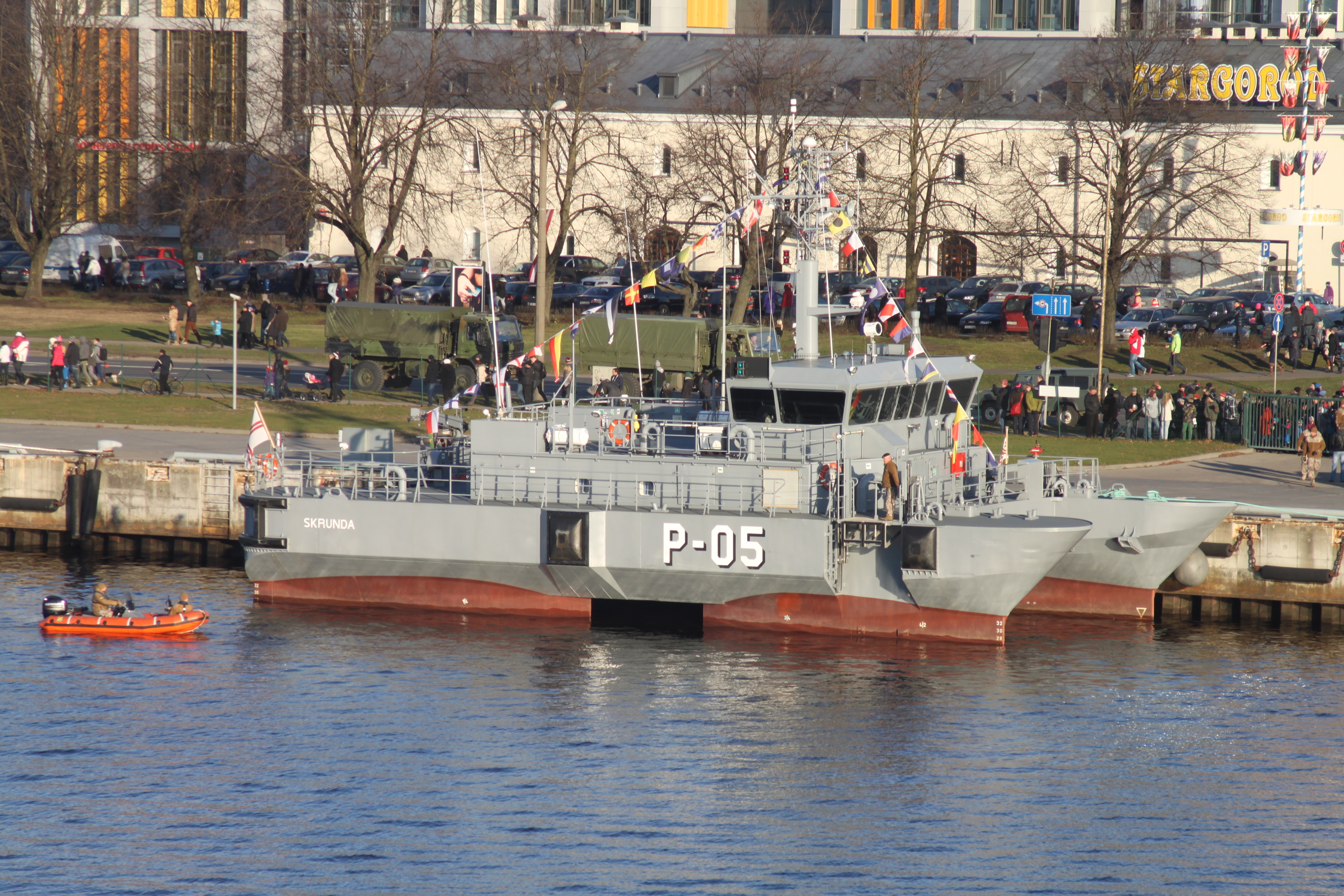

Class overview
- Name: Skrunda class
- Builders: Abeking & Rasmussen; Riga Shipyard
- Operators: Latvian Naval Forces
- Preceded by: Storm class
- In commission: 2011–present
- Planned: 5
- Completed: 5
- Active: 5

General characteristics
- Type: Patrol boat
- Displacement: 125 tons
- Length: 25.7 m (84 ft 4 in)
- Beam: 13.5 m (44 ft 3 in)
- Draft: 2.7 m (8 ft 10 in)
- Propulsion: 2 x MAN D 2842 diesel engines and Servogear CPPs, 1,620 kW (2,170 hp)
- Speed: 20 knots (37 km/h; 23 mph)
- Range: 1,000 nmi (1,900 km; 1,200 mi) at 12 knots (22 km/h; 14 mph)
- Boats & landing craft carried: 1 x RIB for shallow water pursuit
- Complement: 8–10 (depending on mission)
- Sensors & processing systems: Raytheon X-band radar and electro optic sensors
- Armament: Modular Mission Module with payload up to 6 tons; 2 × 12.7 mm (0.50 in) machine guns

The Skrunda class is a class of SWATH patrol vessels used by the Latvian Navy. The main duties of the vessels include fisheries inspections, search and rescue, environmental protection, sovereignty enforcement, and participation in NATO and EU operations.

== Description ==
The Skrunda class was ordered in 2008 and built in cooperation by Abeking & Rasmussen Shipyard in Germany and Riga Shipyard in Latvia between 2009 and 2013. The class and the five vessels are named after towns and cities in Latvia from each of the five historical regions of Latvia, where important battles for Latvia's independence took place. The design is based on the well proven Abeking & Rasmussen 25-metre (82 ft) SWATH Pilot boat design, which is known for its excellent seaworthiness, offering motions in high sea state similar to conventional monohull ships three to four times its size. Skrunda-class vessels are able to perform 100% of their duties in waves as high as 3.5 metres (11 ft). The propulsion system was designed specifically for the Skrunda class and places two MAN D 2842 diesel engines in the lower torpedo hulls, driving Servogear controllable pitch propellers via Servogear reduction gearboxes.

Tasked to monitor and control the Latvian and EU territorial waters and exclusive economic zone, the Skrunda class can perform a number of different missions by changing the mission module between the bows of the two hulls, which adheres to the dimensions of a 20-foot (6.1 m) ISO container and has a payload of 6 tons. A Mission Module may contain weapons systems, equipment for hydrographic surveying, environmental protection, support for divers, or mine countermeasure operations.

== Armament ==
The standard armament consists of two 12.7-millimetre (0.50 in) machine guns. In addition, one Mission Module can be installed with a weapons system that weighs up to 6 tons.

== Vessels in class ==
Pennant Number	Name	Shipyard	Launched	In service
P-05	Skrunda	Abeking & Rasmussen, Germany	20 January 2011	18 April 2011
P-06	Cēsis	Abeking & Rasmussen, Germany	23 November 2011	2 April 2012
P-07	Viesīte	Riga Shipyard, Latvia	11 April 2012	22 August 2012
P-08	Jelgava	Abeking & Rasmussen, Germany	16 April 2013	24 July 2013
P-09	Rēzekne	Riga Shipyard, Latvia	14 October 2013	20 March 2014

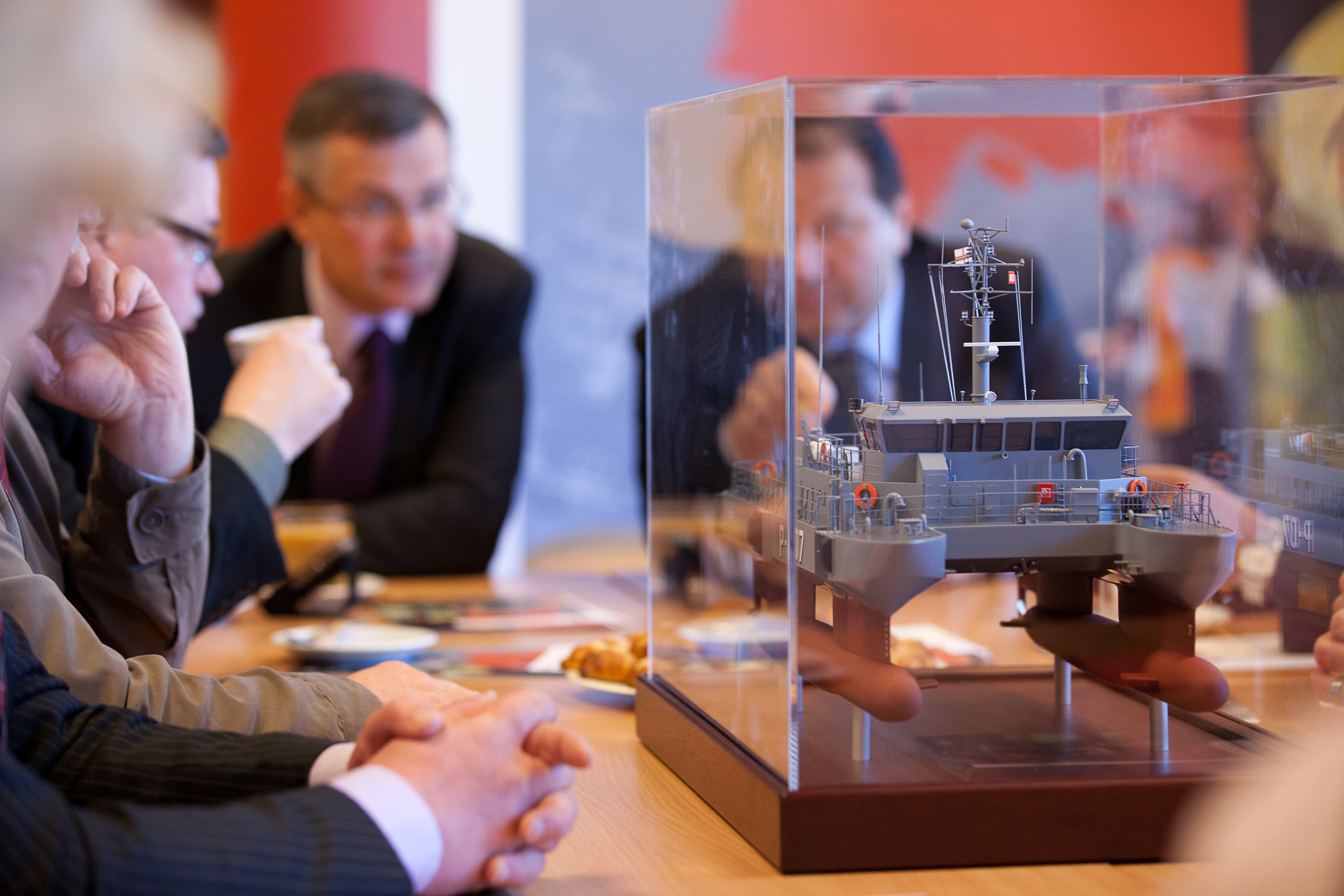
A scale model of a ship, presented to members of the Saeima on a visit to the Riga Shipyard in 2011

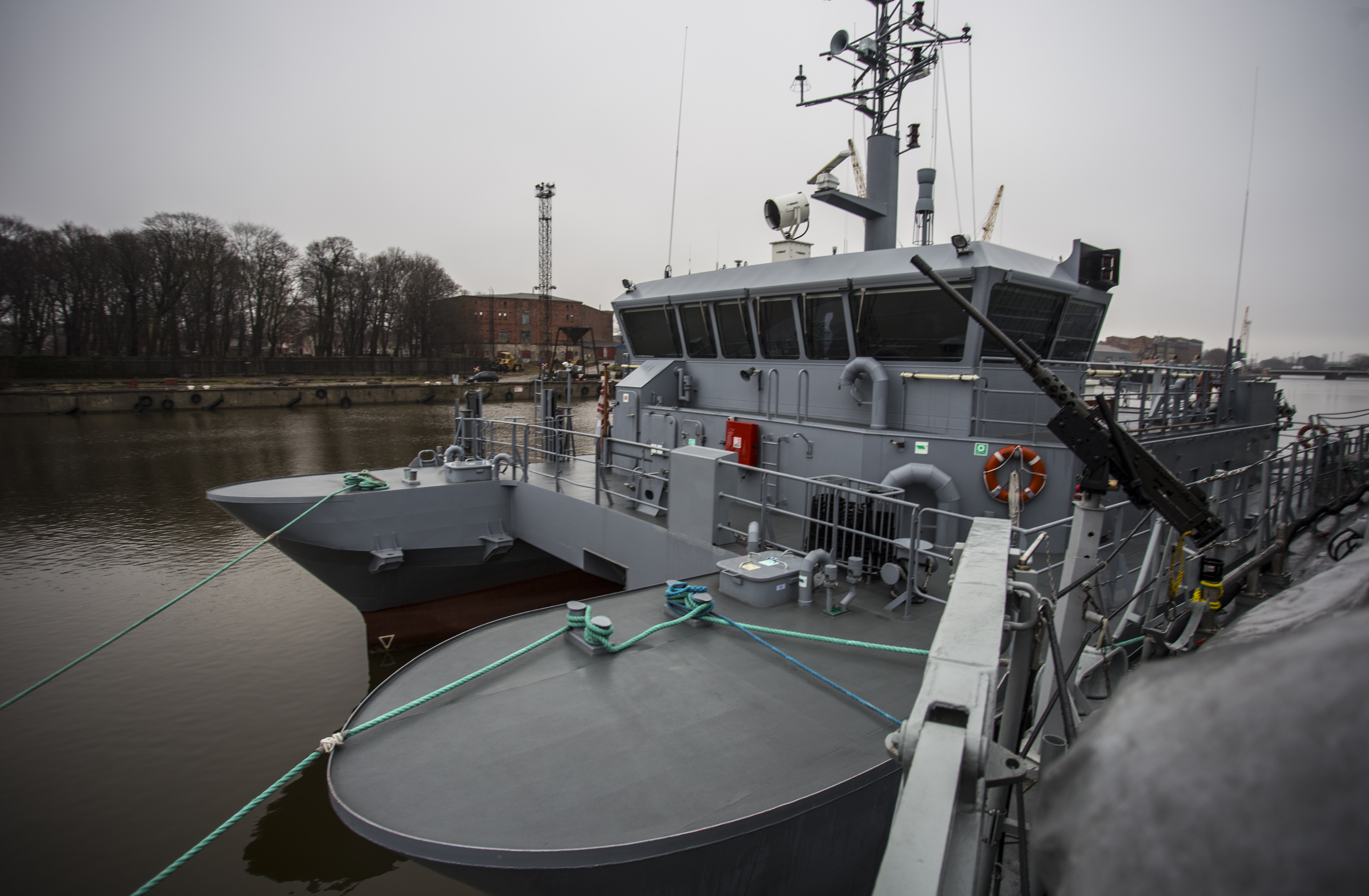
The P-05 Skrunda, displaying its M2 Browning machine gun

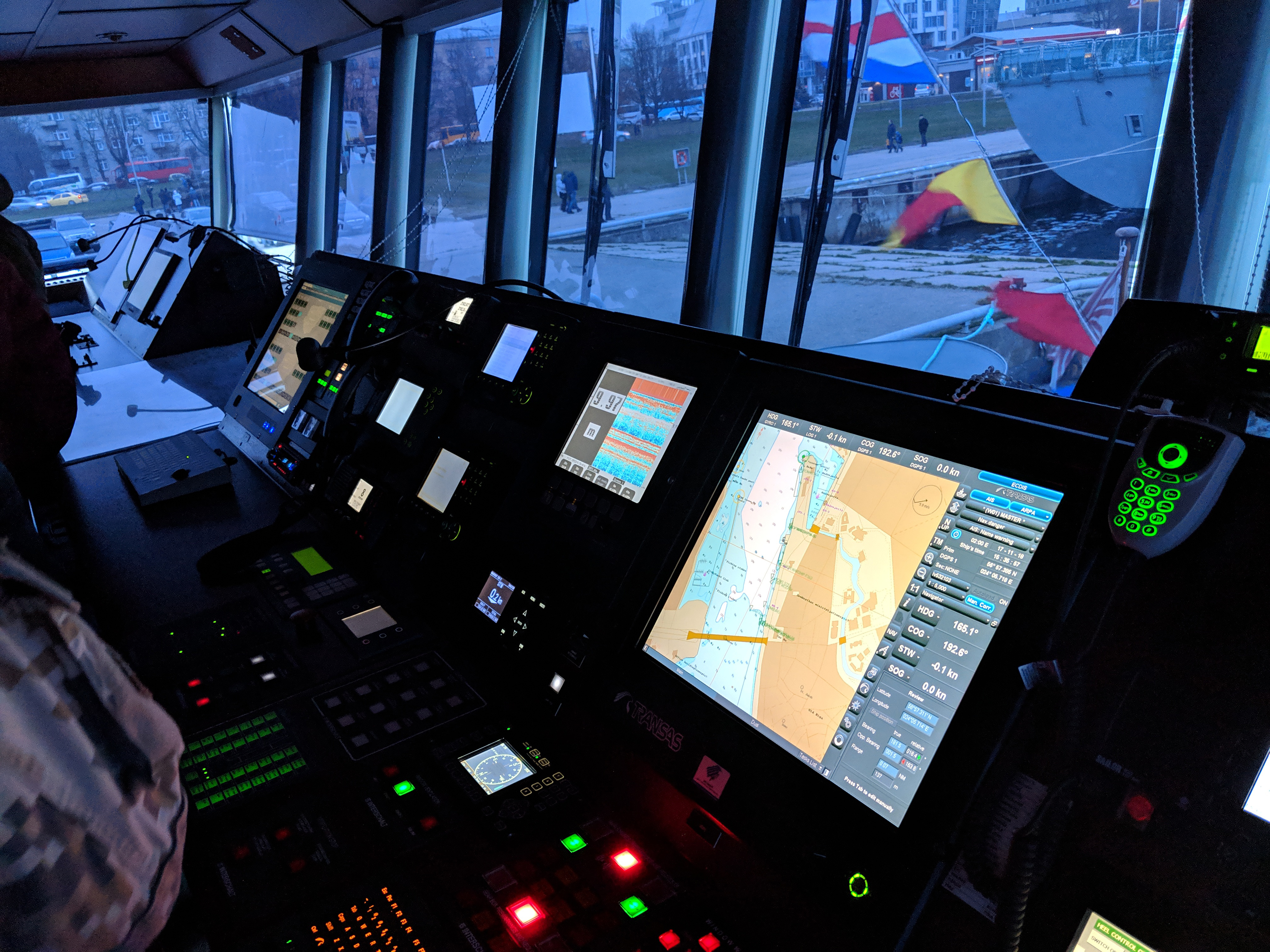
Interior of the deck

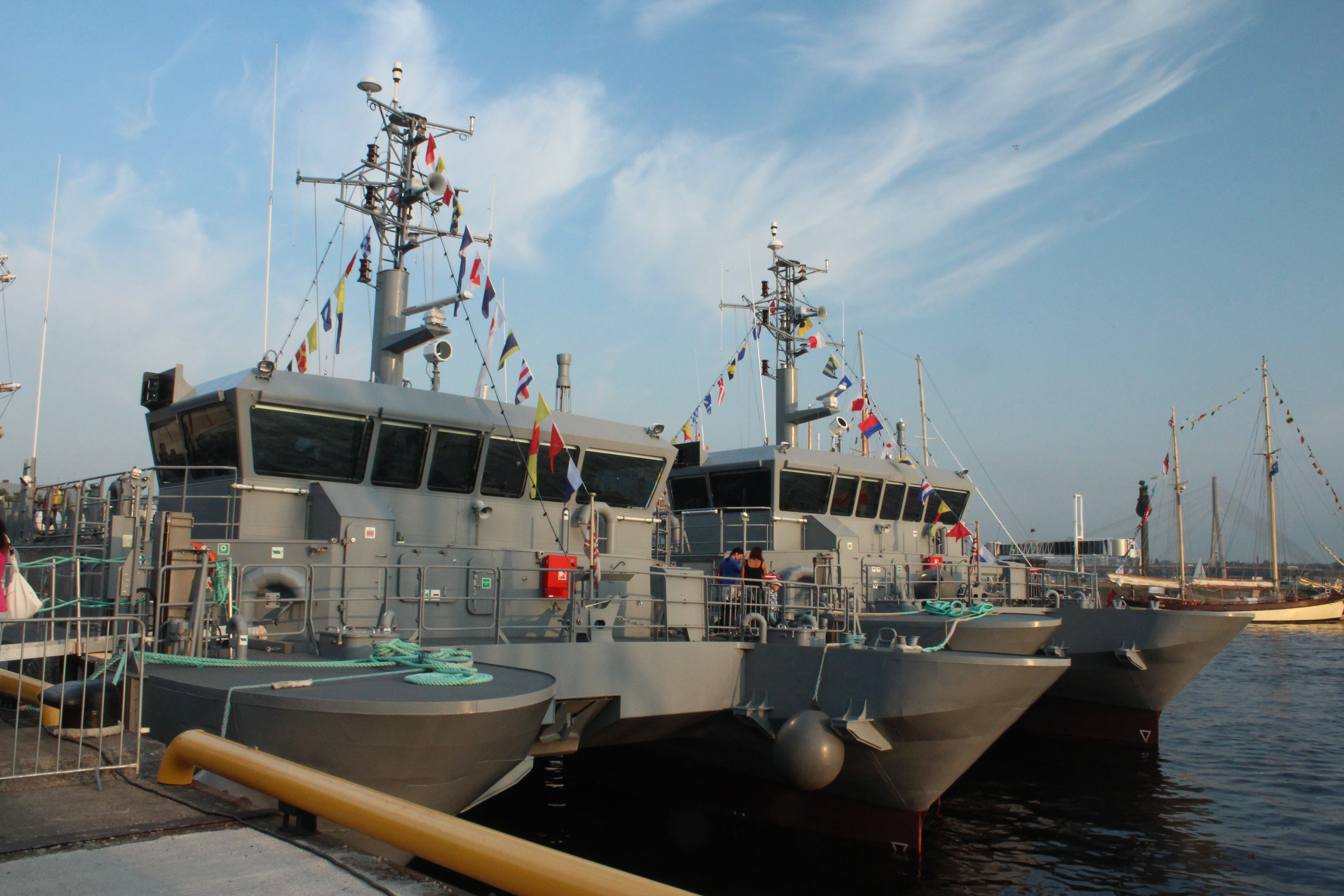
P-05 Skrunda and P-07 Viesīte side-by-side on an open day in Andrejsala
