= Eriks Ādamsons =

Latvian novelist

- Born: 22 June 1907; Rīga, Russian Empire (Now Latvia)
- Died: 28 February 1946 (aged 38); Rīga, Latvian SSR
- Occupations: writer, poet, translator
- Spouse(s): Mirdza Ķempe, Elvīra Berta Padega
- Writing career
- Pen name: Eriks Rīga

Eriks Ādamsons (22 June 1907 – 28 February 1946) was a Latvian writer, poet and novelist.

== Biography ==
Eriks Ādamsons was born in Riga on 22 June 1907. In 1926 he started law studies in Latvian University. He made his first publication in 1924. In the 1930s he fully devoted himself to literature. Ādamsons also worked as translator (he knew: Russian, German, English and French languages). He married young Latvian writer Mirdza Ķempe in 1931, but their marriage broke apart shortly before World War II.

In the years of German occupation he worked in book store and also in lumbering. His works were banned by German authorities, so he published under the pseudonym Eriks Rīga. In those years his health declined and he caught tuberculosis. In 1943 he started collect materials for book about Latvian painter Kārlis Padegs. This work was never finished. In 1944 Eriks Ādamsons married the widow of Kārlis Padegs, Elvīra Berta Padega, who also suffered from tuberculosis. In 1945 they had a son Askolds, but he died after a few months. In 1946 Ādamsons health declined very fast and he died in Biķernieki sanatorium on 28 February 1946. He is buried at the Rainis Cemetery in Riga.

== Literature ==
Eriks Ādamsons was known as an aesthete in life and also in his works. His novels and poems are sometimes called ornamental literature because of attention to smallest details. His poetry is referred to through dekadence, baroque, rococo and jugendstil. His biggest influences were works by Oscar Wilde and Knut Hamsun.

== Works ==
- Sudrabs ugunī (Silver in Fire, poems, 1932)
- Smalkās kaites (Delicate Ailments, short stories, 1937)
- Ģerboņi (Coats of Arms, poems, 1937)
- Čigānmeitēns Ringla (Gipsy Girl Ringla, a long poem for children, 1939)
- Saules pulkstenis (Sun Clock, poems, 1941)
- Lielais spītnieks (The Great Stubborn, short stories, 1942)
- Koklētājs Samtabikse (Kokle Player in Velvet Pants, a long poem for children, 1943)
- Sava ceļa gājējs (Walking His Own Way, a novel, 1943–1944)
- Sapņu pīpe (The Pipe of Dreams, late poems, 1951)
