= Ziemeļu priekšpilsēta (Liepāja) =

Neighbourhood of Liepaja, Latvia

Coordinates: 56°31′57″N 21°00′46″E

Ziemeļu priekšpilsēta (North suburbs) is a modern neighborhood in Liepāja, Latvia. Located south from Karosta next to Jaunliepāja. In the recent years there has been a high crime rate and it is considered as an unsafe neighborhood.
