= Jaunā pasaule (Liepāja) =

Neighbourhood of Liepāja, Latvia

Coordinates: 56°32′14″N 21°04′53″E

Jaunā pasaule (the New World) is a neighborhood of Liepāja, Latvia. It is located near the east border of the city, south of the Zaļā birzeneighborhood and the Jelgava–Liepāja Railway. The neighborhood is home to Liepāja Bus Park and various businesses, as well as residential areas.
