= Vecliepāja =

Neighbourhood of Liepaja, Latvia

Coordinates: 56°30′N 21°01′E

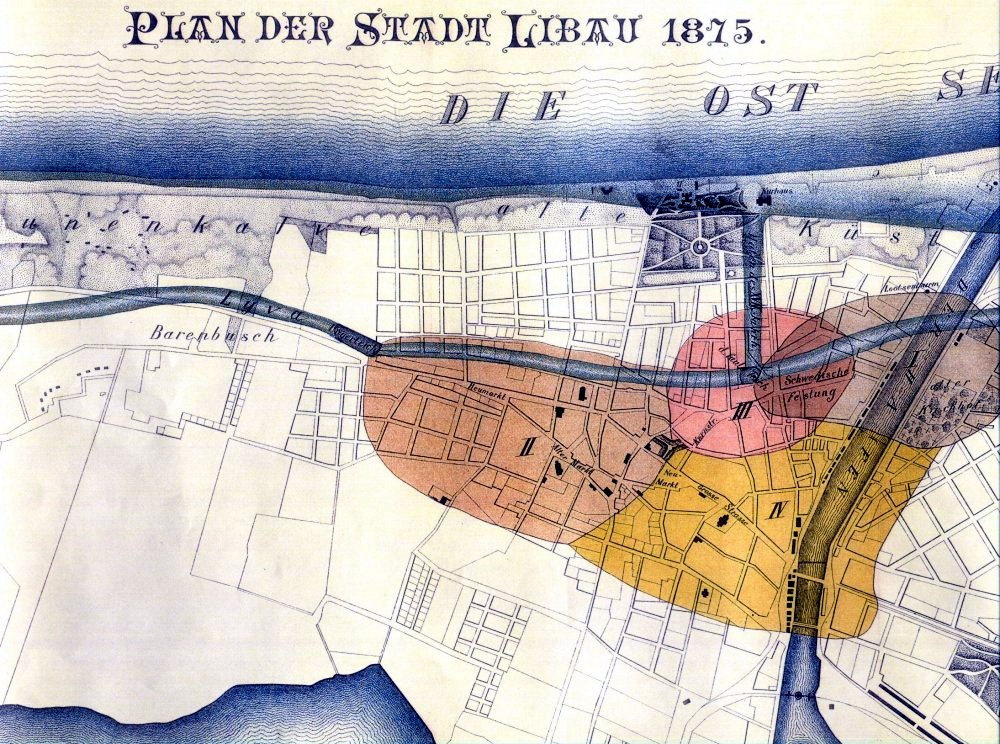
Vecliepāja (1875)

Vecliepāja (Old Liepāja) is the largest and oldest district in Liepāja, Latvia.
