= Ezerkrasts =

Neighborhood in Liepāja, Latvia

Coordinates: 56°28′56″N 21°01′12″E

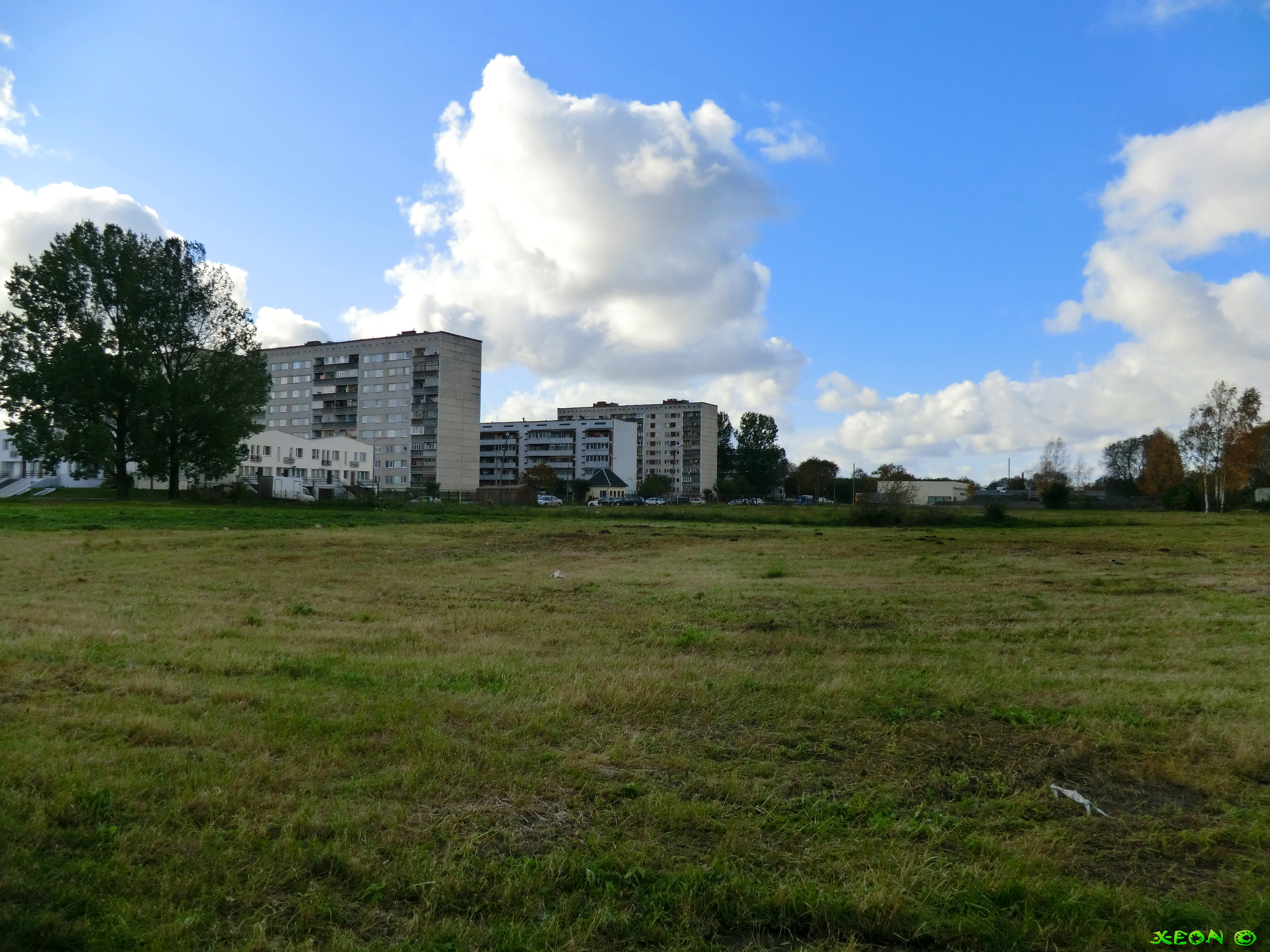
Apartments in Ezerkrast 2

Ezerkrasts is one of the largest and most modern neighbourhoods of Liepāja, Latvia. It is located near the southern border of the city, on the western coast of Liepāja lake. Ezerkrasts named so after the naming contest in 1975, in which this name was selected from 108 other variants.

Ezerkrasts consists of three parts called Ezerkrasts 1, Ezerkrasts 2 and Ezerkrasts 3.
