= Jaunliepāja =

Neighborhood in Liepāja, Latvia

Coordinates: 56°31′12″N 21°00′47″E

Jaunliepāja is one of the neighbourhoods of Liepāja, Latvia.
