= Zaļā birze =

Place neighbourhoods of Liepāja

Coordinates: 56°32′58″N 21°04′55″E

Zaļā birze (Green grove) is one of the modern neighbourhoods of Liepāja, Latvia and is located in the north-eastern part of the city. The Zaļā birze neighborhood hosts the Liepāja Central Hospital and the Liepāja Business Center.
