= Velnciems =

Neighbourhood of Liepaja, Latvia

Coordinates: 56°31′51″N 21°01′40″E

Velnciems (Devil's village) is one of the oldest districts of Liepāja, Latvia. Located near Lauma's district, at the east side of the city.

== History ==
According to a legend it was named by Peter The Great during his visit to Liepāja in 1697. Velnciems consists mostly of private one or two store houses. Liepāja Medical College is located in Velnciems.
