= Kuldīga district =

District of Latvia

Coordinates: 56°58′07″N 21°58′18″E

Kuldīga district Kuldīgas rajons
- District
- Coat of arms

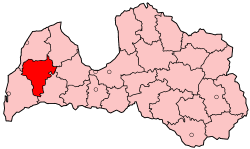
- Country: Latvia

Area
  - Total: 2,499.87 km^{2} (965.21 sq mi)

Population
  - Total: 37,119
  - Density: 14.848/km^{2} (38.457/sq mi)
- Website: 85.15.239.241

Kuldīga district (Latvian: Kuldīgas rajons) was an administrative division of Latvia, located in Courland region, in the country's west. It was organized into a city and thirteen parishes, each with a local government authority. The main city in the district was Kuldīga.

The district was located in the western part of Latvia on both sides of the Venta River. It had borders with 5 other former districts: Ventspils, Talsi, Tukums, Saldus and Liepāja. The borders of the district that it had when it was dissolved were established in 1950.

Districts were eliminated during the administrative-territorial reform in 2009, and Kuldīga district was split into Alsunga Municipality, Kuldīga Municipality and Skrunda Municipality.

The district occupied an area of 2,499.87 km^{2}, has a population of 37,119 — 13,335 in the main town of Kuldīga.

== Economy ==
Railroads in Kuldīga district connect Riga to Liepāja and Liepāja to Ventspils, the latter being closed for public traffic. Also, one of the main roads in Latvia — route A9 from Riga to Liepāja goes through the territory. The main industries are agriculture, wood processing, forestry, and fish farming.

== Terrain ==
The Piejuras Plains lie in the north-western part of the district. In the middle of the district are the Rietumkurzemes Heights with hills that are 100–120 m above sea level, the highest point being Vardupe Kalns with a peak at 140 m. In the northeast side of the district are the Austrumkurzemes Heights at 60–110 m above sea level. Hilly relief covers 35% of the district territory. There are more than 40 rivers longer than 5 km, and 48 lakes bigger than 1 km^{2}. The largest rivers are the Venta River and the Abava River. Forests cover about 48% of the district territory.

The average temperature in January is about -3 °C, in July +16.8 °C. The amount of precipitation is 600–700 mm per year.

== Cities and parishes of the Kuldīga district ==
- Kuldīga town
- Skrunda town
- Alsunga Parish
- Ēdole Parish
- Gudenieki Parish
- Īvande Parish
- Kabile Parish
- Kurmāle Parish
- Laidi Parish
- Nīkrāce Parish
- Padure Parish
- Pelči Parish
- Raņķi Parish
- Renda Parish
- Rumba Parish
- Rudbārži Parish
- Snēpele Parish
- Turlava Parish
- Vārme Parish
