= Bandava =

Former principality in Latvia

Eldership of Bandava Bandava
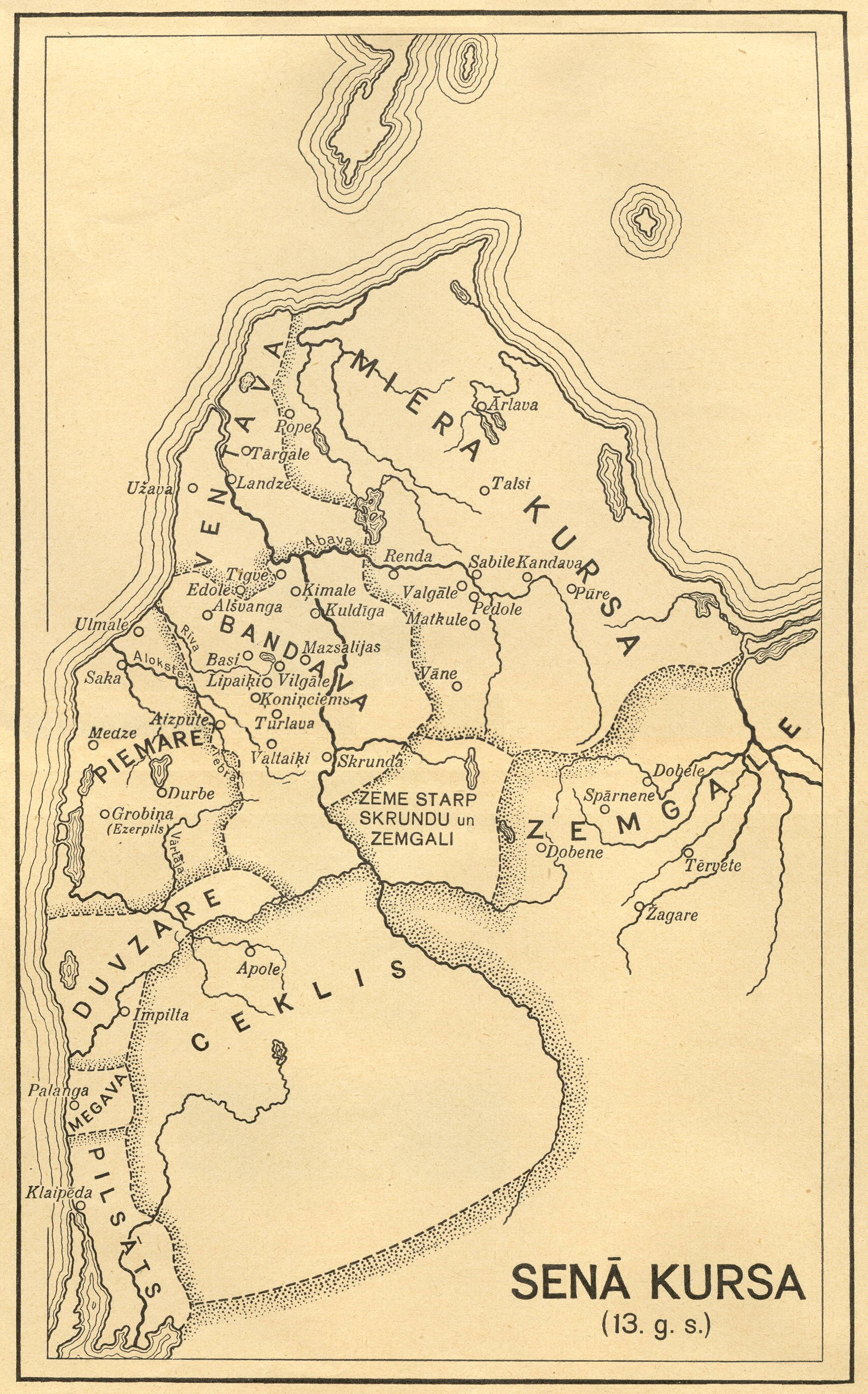
- Capital: Kuldīga; 56°58′N 21°58′E
- Common languages: Curonian language

Bandava (in Latvian and Lithuanian; Latin: Bandowe) was an old Curonian land which existed in the territory of the Latvia during the late Iron Age until it was conquered and divided in 1253 by Bishopric of Courland and Livonian Order.

== History ==
It is first mentioned in the biography of Bishop Ansgar ("Vita Anskarii") written by Bishop Rimbert of Bremen (lived before 888 AD). It is also mentioned in the January 17, 1231 treaty between the Baldwin von Alna and Curonians.

In the April 4, 1253 treaty it was split between Bishop of Courland and Order of Livonia.

== Geography ==
The country was located between Ventava, Ceklis, Piemare, Duvzare and the Baltic Sea on the present territory of Ventspils district and Kuldīga district in Latvia with the administrative center near the modern-day Kuldīga.

It included some of the following villages (villae): Valtaiķi, Sermīte, Vepele, Libiņi, Skrunda, Jērnieki, Turlava (Lipaiķi), Alsunga, Arsene, Asene, Ursuļi, Urāle, Ardone, Pakare, Nikte, Šķēde, Snēpele, Vilgāle, Kormale, Ķimale, Īvande, Tigve, Karitanke, Velži and Manestute.

In the treaty of April 4, 1253, concluded by the Bishop of Courland Heinrich and the Master of the Livonian Order, the land of Bandava was divided into two parts. The north-eastern part with Kuldīga Castle near Venta river was received by the Livonian Order, but the south-western part with Aizpute and Embūte castles was further ruled by the Diocese of Kurzeme.

The settlements of Bandava referred to in the Agreement in the part of the Livonian Order (two thirds of Bandava):

- Walteten — Valtaiķi (Laidi Parish),
- Sargamiten — Sermīte (Laidi Parish),
- Wepele — Vaipas (Kazdanga Parish),
- Lippeten or Lippayten — Lipaiķi (Turlava Parish),
- Libben — Libiņi (Turlava Parish),
- Scrunden — Skrunda,
- Irien or Yrien — Jērnieki vai Dziras (Nīgrande Parish),
- Turlowe — Turlava (Turlava Parish),
- Alswangen — Alsunga,
- Asen — Āžu mājas (Kazdanga Parish),
- Arsen — Ārzes or Ārdze (Laidi Parish),
- Iherusalem or Iursalen — Ursuļi (Kazdanga Parish),
- Arolde or Aralden — Urāle (Aizpute Parish),
- Arden — Ardone (?) (Aizpute Parish),
- castellatura Dzerbithen — Raņķu (Irbes?) pilskalns (Raņķi Parish),
- Mesete or Masote — ? (Raņķi Parish),
- Packare — Pakare?,
- Nicken or Nitthen — Nikte (Vārme Parish),
- Scheden — Šķēde (Vārme Parish),
- Pavelden or Paiulden — Snēpele (Snēpele Parish),
- Villegale — Vilgale (Kurmāle Parish),
- Eze — Īvandes mācītājmuiža (Īvande Parish),
- Kewele or Kewalen — Ķimale (Īvande Parish),
- Kormale or Kormalen — Kurmāle (Kurmāle Parish),
- Kemalen — Ķimale (Padure Parish),
- Ywande — Īvande (Īvande Parish),
- Togowe or Tigwen — Tigas (Padure Parish).

The settlements of Bandava in the part of the bishop of Kurzeme mentioned in the agreement (one third of Bandava):

- Amboten — Embūte, (Embūte Parish),
- Kalten — Kalši, (Vaiņode Parish),
- Baten — Bāte, (Vaiņode Parish),
- Waruwe — Vārve, (Tadaiķi Parish),
- Elkene — Elkuzeme, (Vaiņode Parish),
- Assiten — Asīte, (Priekule Parish),
- Rese — Rēzas, (Embūte Parish),
- Cepse — Sepene, (Embūte Parish),
- Padoren — Tāšu Padure, (Kalvene Parish),
- Selde or Celde — Cildi, (Kazdanga Parish),
- Lene — Lēņi, (Rudbārži Parish),
- Nodingen or Nedingen — Nēdinga, (Embūte Parish),
- Parbonen — Pērbone, (Kalvene Parish),
- Kalnien or Kalven — Kalvene, (Kalvene Parish),
- Apussen — Vecapūze, (Rudbārži Parish),
- Hasenpotten — Aizpute,
- Iameten — Jamaiķi, (Turlava Parish),
- Scherenden or Zerenden — Cerenda or Cindari, (Gudenieki Parish),
- Adze — Adze, (Gudenieki Parish),
- Pewe — Pievika (Gudenieki Parish).

== Bibliography ==
- Švābe, Arveds (1938), Straumes un avoti, Rīga
- Bielenstein, August Johann Gottfried (1892), Die Grenzen des lettischen Volksstammes und der lettischen Sprache in der Gegenwart und im 13. Jahrhundert, St. Petersburg
