= Kurmāle Parish =

Parish of Latvia

- parish of Latvia
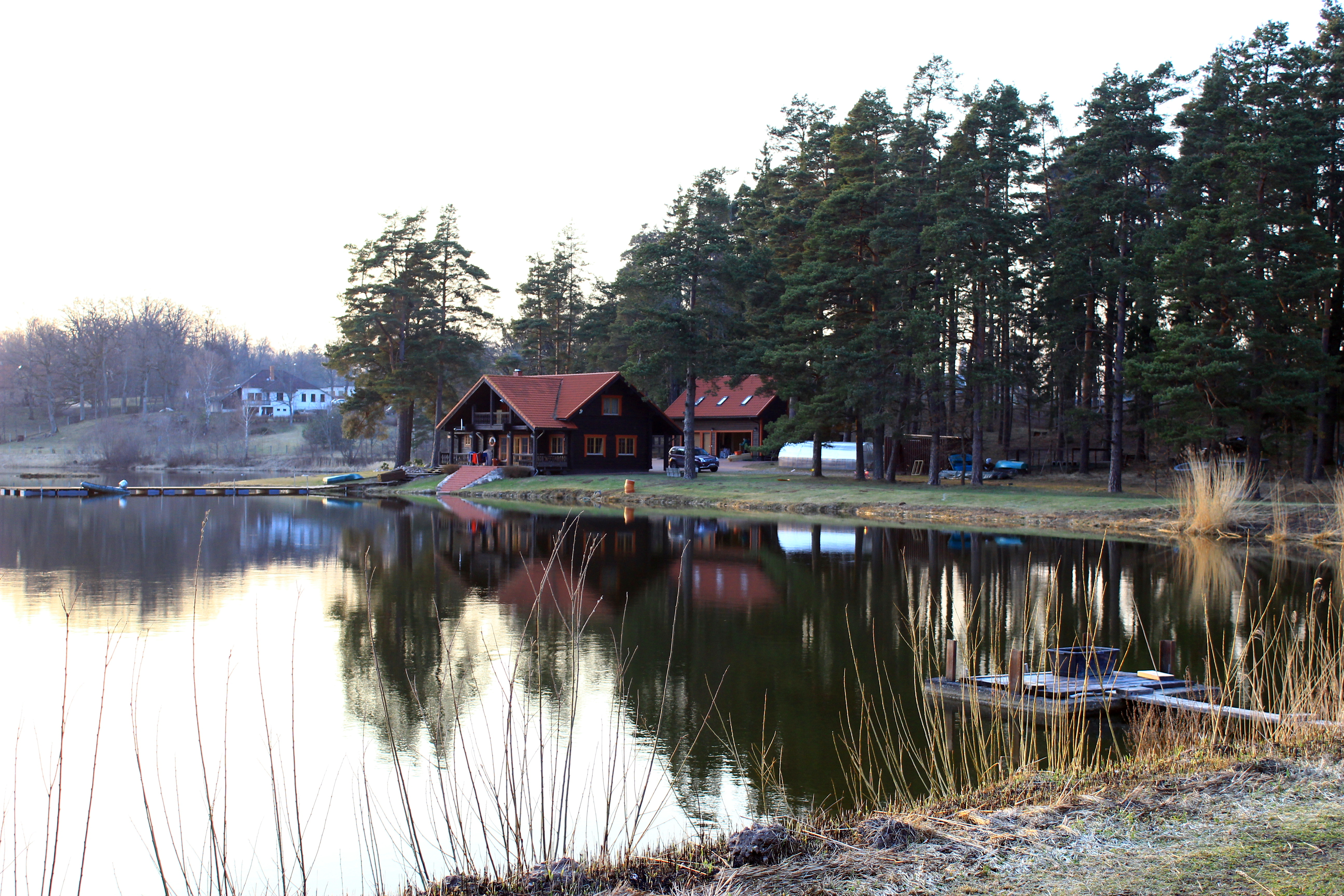

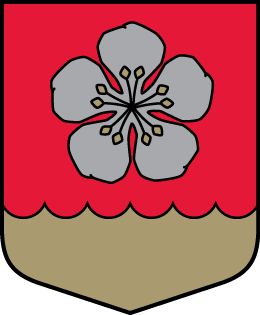
- Coat of arms

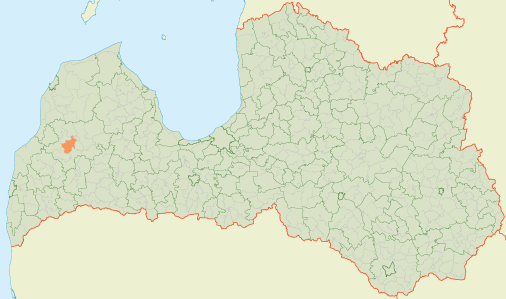
- 56°54′35″N 21°51′17″E
- Country: Latvia

Area
  - Total: 113.89 km^{2} (43.97 sq mi)
  - Land: 109.04 km^{2} (42.10 sq mi)
  - Water: 4.85 km^{2} (1.87 sq mi)

Population (1 January 2025)
  - Total: 1,854
  - Density: 16/km^{2} (42/sq mi)
- Website: kurmale.lv

Kurmāle Parish (Latvian: Kurmāles pagasts) is an administrative unit of Kuldīga Municipality in the Courland region of Latvia. The parish has a population of 2209 (as of 1/07/2010) and covers an area of 113.68 km^{2}.

== History ==
Kurmale Parish is the central part of Bandava, the ancient Curonian kingdom. In ancient documents, Kurmale was first mentioned in the treaty of the Pope's vicar Baldwin of Alna in 1253 with the Curonians, afterwards Livonian Order took control of Kurmali, and it was called Cormelele in the Latin texts and Kormalen in the German texts.

In 1253, the treaty also mentions Vilgale-Willegale. Planica's writings refer to Plentzen in 1335, Planezen in 1841, Klanici Manor in 1912, and Planica Parish with Planica, Jatele, Pauline and Zaļo Manors in 1938.

=== Archeological sites ===
The ancient Bandava land within the boundaries of Kurmale parish has been populated even before these times. The archeological artifacts of these earlier times has been found at the Kurmale castle mound between the Yuks, Rundāle and Meņģi, Grotleja and Sudmalleju ancient burial ground. In the 1920s, antiques were found at Vilgāle Lake, on the hillside near Bauži House.

The historical site of the Karate hill between the Saddle and Kurmale hillfort, almost all has been removed in process of construction of the Edole road in the 1970s. In 16th and 17th century that was a place for punishment of witches. Those convicted are buried in the Saddle Cemetery.

In the territory of the present Kurmale Parish there were historically Ernst Manor (German: Gut Ernsthof), Jatele Manor (German: Gut Jahteln, Jātele), Kurmale Manor (German: Gut Kurmahlen, Kurmāle), Planica Manor (German: Gut Planetzen, Alejas), Taurkalne Manor (German: Gut Tauerkaln), Vilgale Manor (German: Gut Wilgahlen, Vecvilgāle ), Zaļā Manor (German: Gut Grünhof, Zaļāmuiža).

=== Revolution of 1905 ===
In 1905 Kurmali and Planica were also taken over by the revolutionary movement of the impoverished Latvian people. Strikes spread to Manors of Jatele, Planica and Kurmale. Local teacher Krišs Newz called for the fight for rights of local Latvian population. Jātele manor was burnt. In December, farmers from the surrounding parishes gathered in Planica forest to "confiscate" the money for dragoons salaries from Kuldiga to Aizpute, but the dragoons took a different route. In the same month, the revolutionaries of the parish were shot or rounded up and sent to katorga.

Much has been written about the extraordinary cruelty of Baron Silvio Bradrich of Kurmale in dealing with the revolutionaries. Old Kurmale residents have said that he was the only such person during challenging revolt.

=== Latvian agrarian reform ===
After Latvian Land Reform of 1920 took effect, on September 15, 1925, the six grade elementary school of Kurmale started operating in Pelči Palace, which until then was located in the same building with the Board of Kurmale Parish on the Kuldiga-Aizpute road. The former parish office, a red brick building, is one of the oldest buildings in the parish.

=== Fate of German colonists ===
After the revolution of 1905, German colonists were deported to Kuldiga County on the initiative of some German barons. Colonists accounted for 35% of population in Kurmale parish and 37% in Planicas.

The Germans had several schools which in 1924 moved to the newly built "Illuminating school". However, in the autumn of 1939 the Germans had to leave their Kurzeme homes and relocate to Germany.

=== Period of Soviet rule ===
On June 14, 1941, and again on March 25, 1949 total of 85 Kurmale residents and 145 Planica residents has been deported by Soviet authorities to Siberia.

When the administrative division of free Latvia was destroyed in Soviet Latvia, the Kurmaale parish was also reorganized, adding Planica Parish and part of Turlava Parish. In the eastern part of the old parish, a new one was established - Ievkalnu parish (now Pelči Parish). In 1950 there were 4 villages in Kurmale and Planīca parishes: Kurmāle, Planīca, Vārdupe and Ievukalns.

The first director of "Vilgāle" farm was Ilmārs Meņģis, and from 1963 to 1992 the farm was managed by Ottis Komarovskis. With good knowledge and skill in farming, being active, responsive, hospitable, Komarovsky was the only one in the Kuldiga district who worked as a farm manager for almost 30 years. During this time, a modern village was built on the shores of Lake Vilgale with multi-storey residential buildings, a government building, a kindergarten, a stage, a mechanical workshop and a sauna.

== Modern period ==
The present Kurmāle parish is located within the boundaries of the Soviet era and is called Kurmāle (with the long "à").

== Villages of Kurmāle parish ==
- Alejas (Planīca)
- Jātele
- Kurmāle
- Priedaine (Kurmāle Parish)
- Smiltnieki (Upīškalns)
- Vecvilgāle
- Vilgāle
- Zaļāmuiža

== Notable people ==
- Actor Ēvalds Valters was born in 1894 in Egleniekos, Planica Parish.
- Mārtiņš Kalns, a secretary and poet of the Kuldīga Town Board, was born in 1909 in the Saddle of Kurmāle Parish.
- Mirdza Dreimane, a ceramicist born in 1922 in Mazruļļi in Kurmaale Parish
- Gaida Grundberga, a sculptor born in 1928 in 'Ozolaine'
- Eduards Berklavs, a soviet dissident and Latvian statesman, one of the founders of the Latvian National Independence Movement, was born in 1914 in Kurmale Parish.
