= List of power stations in Latvia =

The following page lists the largest operational power stations in Latvia, with installed capacity of 20 MW or more.

Station	Town	Coordinates	Type	Capacity (MW)	Completed	Notes
Pļaviņas Hydroelectric Power Station	Aizkraukle	56.5822027°N 25.2373123°E	Hydroelectric	883.5	1965	
Rīga Thermal Power Station-2	Rīga	56.9170000°N 24.2759000°E	Natural gas	881	1974	
Riga Hydroelectric Power Plant	Salaspils	56.8513187°N 24.2720389°E	Hydroelectric	402	1974	
Aizpute Solar Farm	Aizpute parish		Solar	265	2026	
Ķegums Hydroelectric Power Station	Ķegums	56.7406744°N 24.710784°E	Hydroelectric	264.1	1940	
Rīga Thermal Power Station-1	Rīga		Natural gas	158	1955	
Tārgale Solar Park	Tārgale parish		Solar	148	2026	
Jēkabpils Solar Farm	Jēkabpils		Solar	120.8	2026	
Laflora Energy Wind Farm	Līvbērze parish		Wind	109	2026	
Vārme Solar Farm	Vārme Parish		Solar	94	2026	
Stelpe Solar Farm I	Stelpe Parish		Solar	72.5	2026	
Stelpe Solar Farm II	Stelpe Parish		Solar	72.5	2026	
Tārgale Wind Park	Tārgale parish		Wind	58.8	2022	
Jelgava Thermal Power Station	Jelgava		Biomass	23	2013	Heating capacity - 45 MW
Pope Wind Farm	Pope parish		Wind	20.7	2012	9 turbines
Ventspils Thermal Power Station	Ventspils		Coal, biomass	20		

== See also ==
- List of power stations in Europe
- List of largest power stations in the world
