= Pelči Palace =

Building in Latvia

Coordinates: 56°55′012″N 21°57′57″E

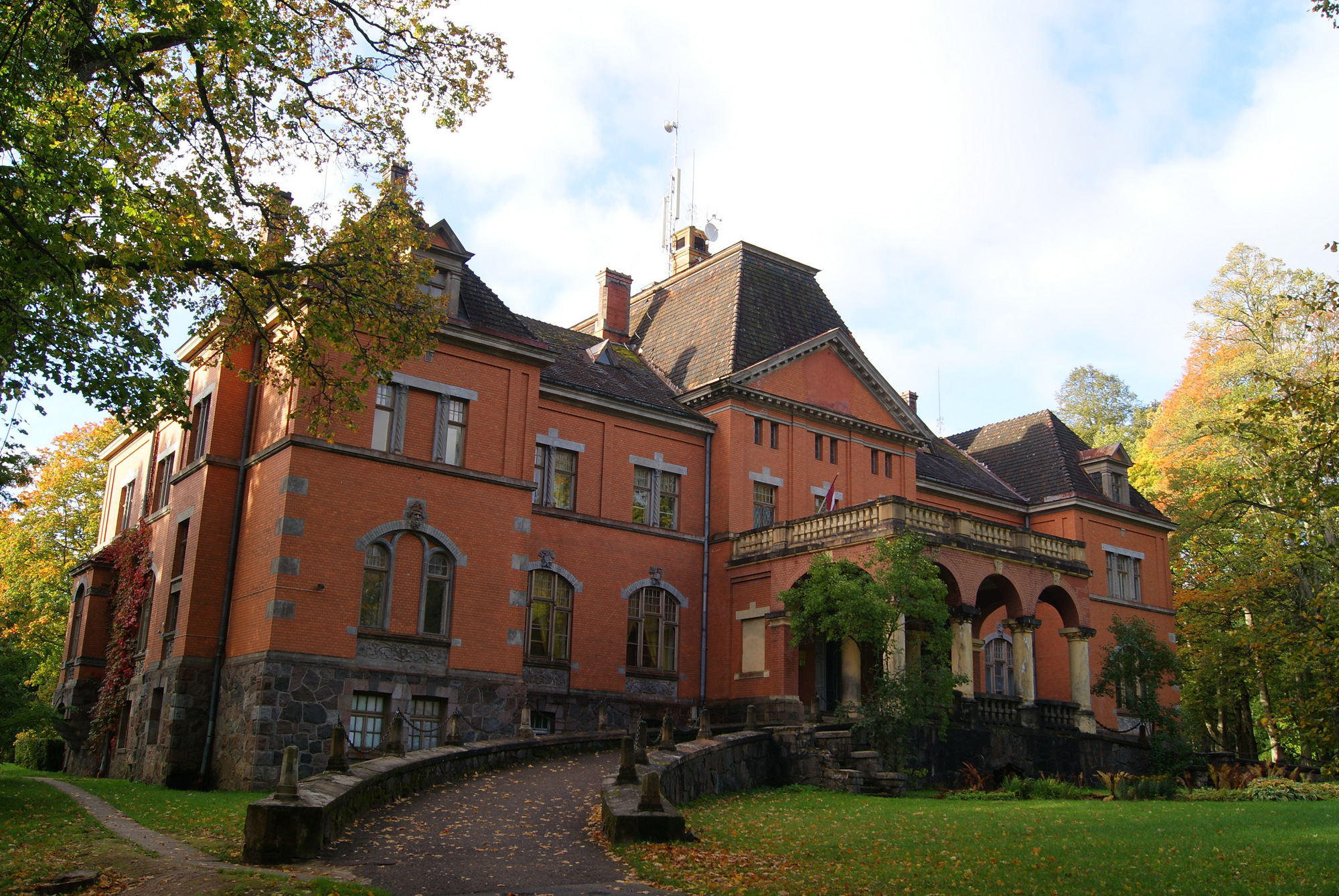
- Interactive map of the Pelči Palace area

General information
- Architectural style: Art Nouveau, Neo-Renaissance
- Location: Kuldīga municipality, Latvia
- Construction started: 1903
- Completed: 1904
- Client: von Lieven family

Design and construction
- Architect: Wilhelm Neumann

Pelči Palace (Latvian: Pelču muižas pils; German: Schloss Pelzen) is a palace located in the Pelči Parish of Kuldīga Municipality, in the Courland region of Latvia. Built during the time of Prince Anatoly Lieven, it is regarded as one of the early Latvian manors which felt the influence of early Art Nouveau, although presently it also shows German Neo-Renaissance, and Baroque features.

== History ==
The palace was built from 1903 to 1904 in Art Nouveau style by architect Wilhelm Neumann (1878 in Germany – 1919 in Riga). All building parts, starting with the front doors, windows, wrought iron roof, shutter closure and all the finishing with interior panels, stair railings, were designed by Neumann. The palace is considered a building of exceptional aesthetic level on all elements of the finishing with high quality facilities and innovative technical equipment. The palace basement has a modern drainage system and water supply. Kilns heat the palace through the first central heating system from the Kuldiga region.

The interior decoration and stairway elements, however, felt the impact of the neo-renaissance decorative style. The first storey of the palace is used for the estate owners needs. The western corner is arranged with a large library. A balcony with a luxurious winding staircase and beautifully styled bookcases heated with warm air from the central heating, has been preserved. The second storey, used for guests, contains a living room, photography room, and exit to a wide balcony. Located in the basement, the kitchen is provided with large stoves and ovens, a bakery, wine and kitchen cellars, as well as a warehousing. In 1922 the Pelči palace was adapted to needs of a school however.

Since late 19th. century Pelči Palace was property of von Lieven family. Family owned the palace until 1920 when after Latvian agrarian reforms all manors and their lands was nationalised and partitioned. In 1922 a local secondary school was located in the palace. During first half of the 1945 headquarters of the Army Group Courland was located in the palace. After the war palace was still used as a school which continues to operate today.

=== Pelči park ===
The Pelči park is 9.21 ha. In 1902 the reconstruction project (extended to the old plantation-based area) was developed by the Riga Park Director Georg Kuphaldt. Most of the park was designed as a free planning landscape park, except for the greenery immediately around and south of the palace used for regular planting programming. Close of the palace there is a stable, an ice cellar, a taskmaster's and manor workers' house.

In 1904 two large semi-circular flowerbeds with symmetrical flower and shrubs compositions were created next to the palace. Regular planning plantations in baroque gardens with the so-called typical embroidered parquet remain. Concentrated in the southern part of the park, conifers - pine, fir, larch, are found to the west of the palace. In the 1980s the inventories identified 48 species of trees and shrubs, including rarities such as a late cherry, service-berry maple, a variety of trees, many red oak and beech.

== See also ==
- List of palaces and manor houses in Latvia

== Sources ==
- Zarāns, Alberts (2006). Latvijas pilis un muižas. Castles and manors of Latvia (in Latvian and English). Riga. ISBN 9984-785-05-X. OCLC 72358861.
