= Vārme Manor =

Manor house in Latvia

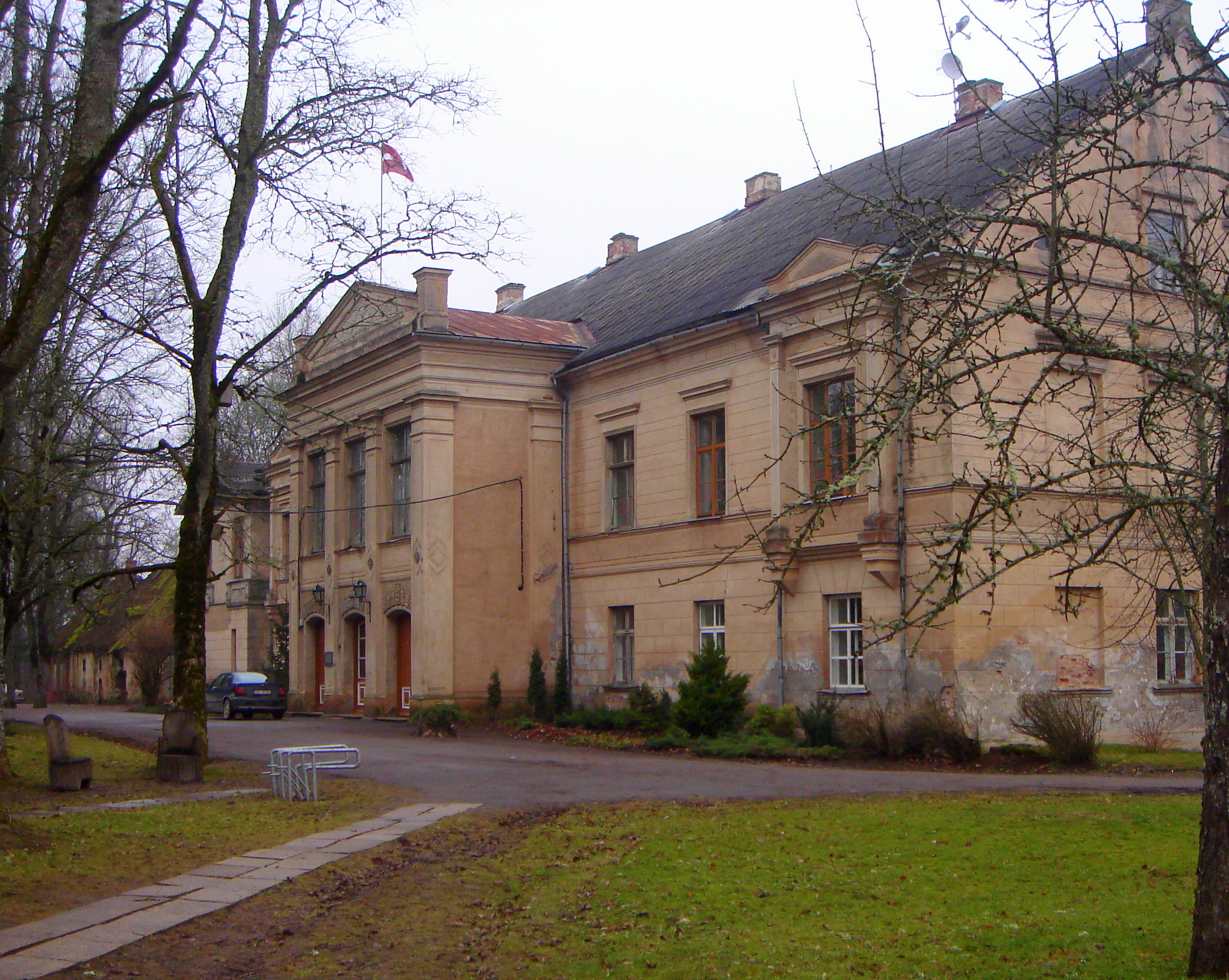

- Location within Latvia

General information
- Location: Vārme Parish, Kuldīga Municipality, Courland, Latvia
- Coordinates: 56°52′26″N 22°14′10″E
- Completed: 1830
- Client: Baron Brinken

Vārme Manor (Latvian: Vārmes muižas pils) is a manor house in Vārme Parish, Kuldīga Municipality, in the historical region of Courland, in western Latvia.

== History ==
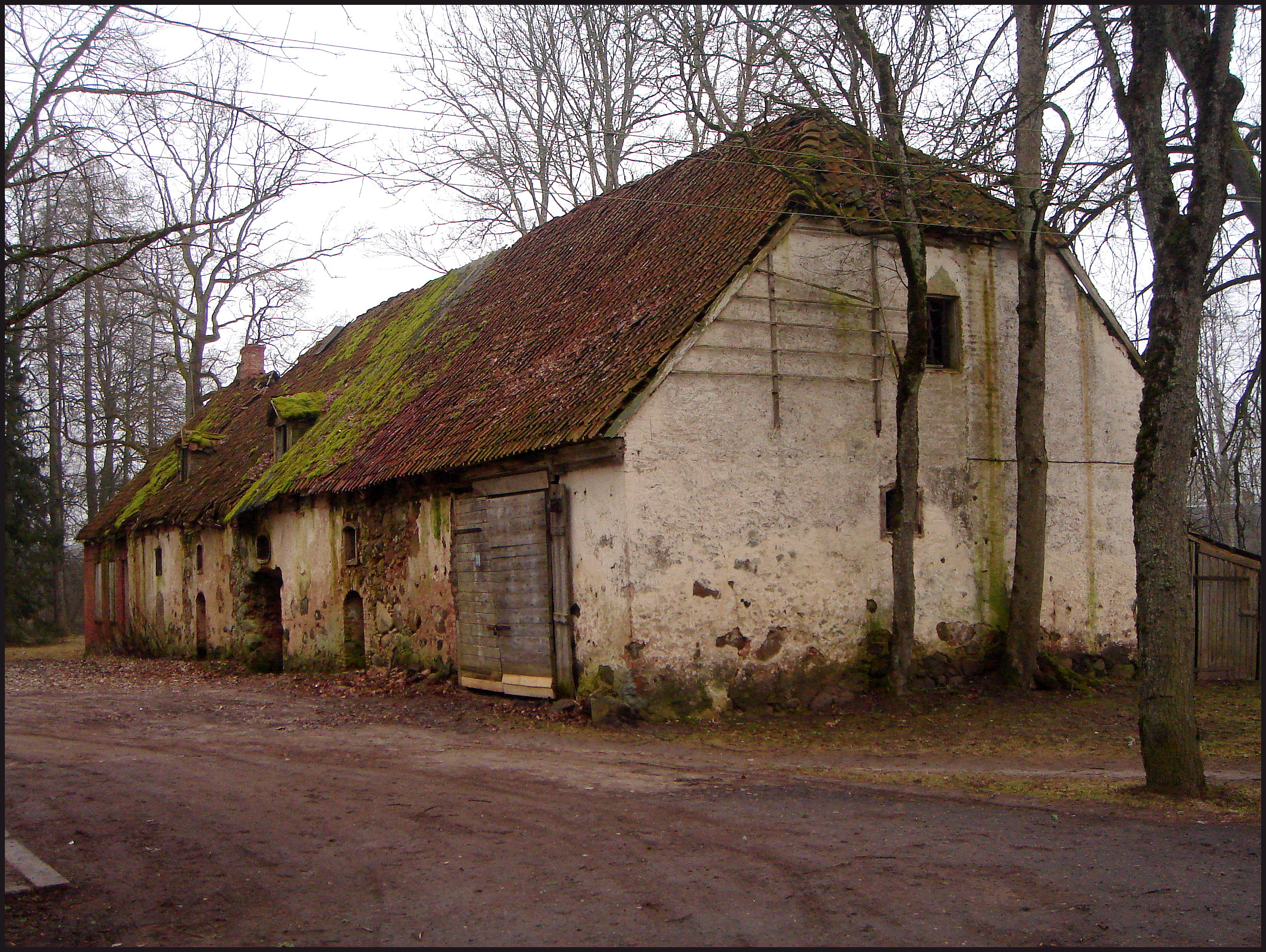
Manor's barn.

The manor house was built in 1830 by Baron Brinken. Since 1926 it houses the Vārme primary school. In May 2016, the school celebrated its 90th anniversary.

== Manor park ==
Rare tree species grow in the formerly manor and now school park - Weymouth pine, Mountain pine, European larch, Dotted hawthorn, European beech, American ash, White walnut, White aspen, Balsam poplar, Silver poplar.

== See also ==
- List of palaces and manor houses in Latvia
