= Zaļā Manor =

Manor house in Latvia

- Courland, Latvia

Site information
- Type: Manor
- Code: LV-3332, Latvia
- Owner: Vilgāle primary school

Location
- Location within Latvia
- Coordinates: 56°52′51.6″N 21°49′13.9″E

Site history
- Built: 1775
- Materials: Brick

Zaļā Manor (Latvian: Zaļā muiža, German: Gut Grünhof) is a manor house in the historical region of Courland, in Vilgāle, Kurmāle Parish, Kuldīga Municipality, Latvia. It serves as the student boarding residence for the Vilgāle primary school.

== See also ==
- List of palaces and manor houses in Latvia
