= Rumba Parish =

Parish of Latvia

- parish of Latvia
- Coat of arms

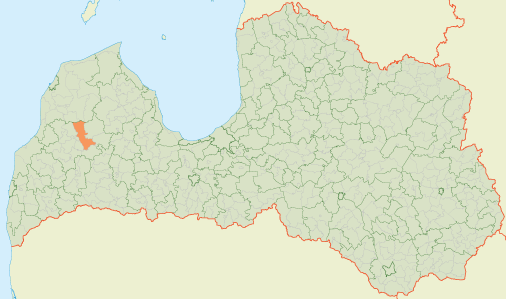
- 56°59′45″N 22°03′26″E

- Location within Latvia
- Country: Latvia

Area
  - Total: 226.19 km^{2} (87.33 sq mi)
  - Land: 219.5 km^{2} (84.7 sq mi)
  - Water: 6.69 km^{2} (2.58 sq mi)

Population (1 January 2026)
  - Total: 1,365
  - Density: 6.219/km^{2} (16.11/sq mi)

Rumba Parish (Latvian: Rumbas pagasts) is an administrative unit of Kuldīga Municipality in the Courland region of Latvia. The parish has a population of 1665 (as of 1/07/2010) and covers an area of 225.92 km^{2}.

== Villages of Rumba parish ==
- Bauņi (Novadnieki)
- Dragūnciems
- Ēdas
- Griķi (Lejas)
- Ķīkciems
- Mežvalde
- Rumbenieki
- Veldze
- Venta

== See also ==
- Curonian Kings
