= Piemare =

Historical region of Latvia

Eldership of Piemare Piemare
- c. 1000–1253
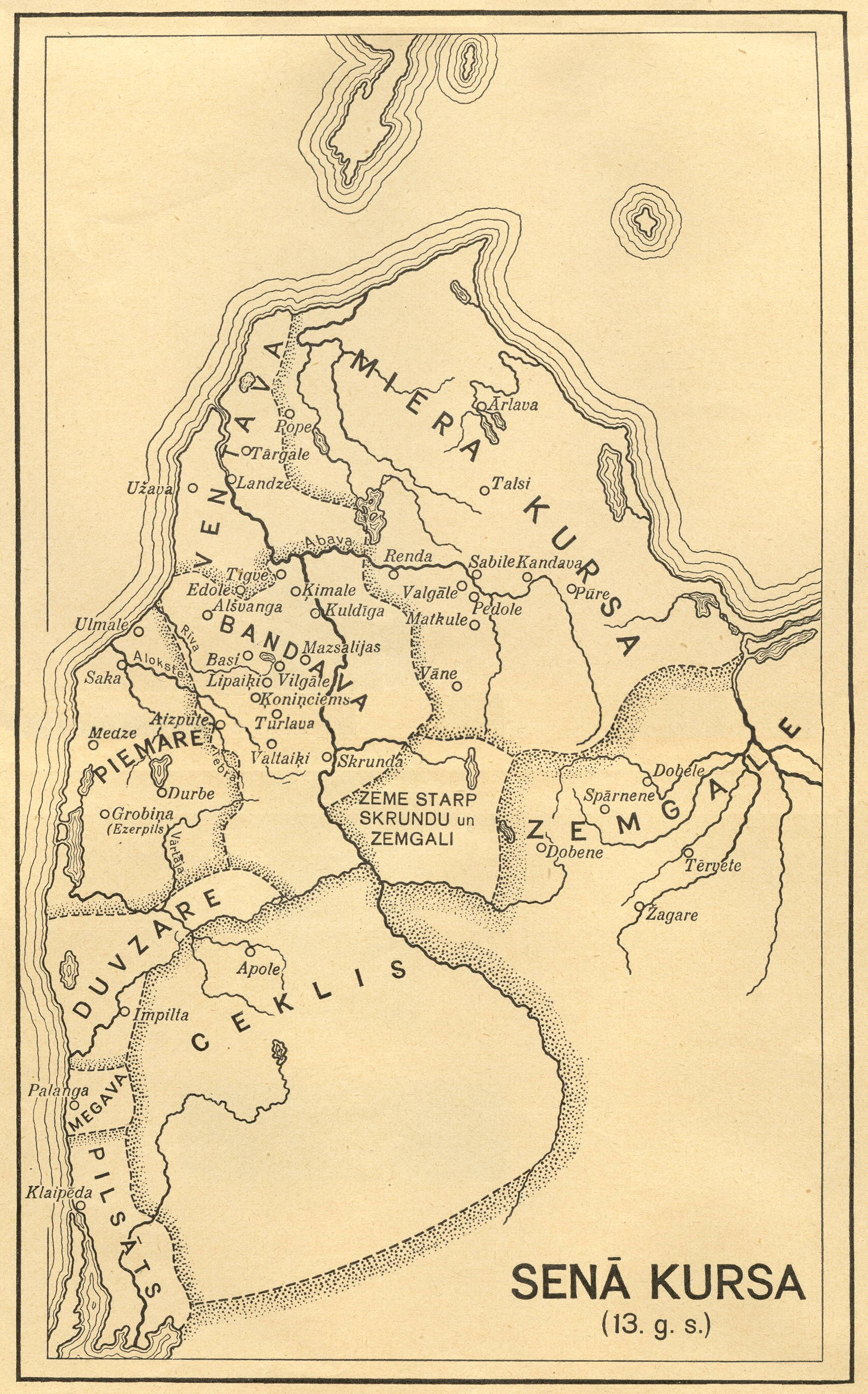
- Capital: Ezerpils (Jūŗpils, Seeburg); 56°32′15″N 21°10′03″E
- Common languages: Curonian
- Government: Principality
  - Prince (rex): Lammekinus (last)
- History
  - Established: c. 1000
  - Disestablished: 1253
Succeeded by
Bishopric of Courland; Livonian Order

Piemare (Lithuanian: Piemarė; Latin: Bihavelanc) was one of the main Curonian kihelkonds with an administrative center in Esestua (Seeburg) before the 13th century. It was located between Bandava, Duvzare and the Baltic Sea on the territory of present Liepāja district in Latvia. For the first time, the territory was mentioned in the memorandum between Lammekinus, king of Esestua and Baudouin of Aulne Abbey, cistercian monk, vicelegate of Pope Gregory IX on 28 December 1230. Toponyms were named in partition agreement between the Bishop of Courland and the Livonian Order in 1253. The territory included the following settlements (Latin: villae): Vārtaja, Tadaiķi, Ūsaiķi, Ilga, Līpa, Gavieze, Vārve, Padone, Peke, Okte, Ģelži, Lindale, Troista, Ievade, Dzēre, Boja, Droga, Krote, Apriķi, Ilmede, Diždupļi, Mazdupļi, Grobiņa, Neres, Stroķi, Tāši, Aistere, Vērgale, Rīva, Medze, Līva, Razge, Perkone, Dunalka, Prūši, Karkele, Dzintere, Saliena and Saka.

== Bibliography ==
- Švābe, Arveds (1938), Straumes un avoti, Rīga
- Bielenstein, August Johann Gottfried (1892), Die Grenzen des lettischen Volksstammes und der lettischen Sprache in der Gegenwart und im 13. Jahrhundert, St. Petersburg: Eggers, ISBN 3-7777-0983-2
- Registra Vaticana, volume 15, fol. 155-r, ep. 185, Vatican Secret Archives
