= Līna Čanka =

Latvian corporal and war hero (1893–1981)

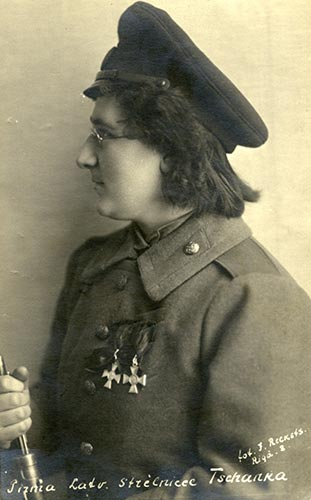
- Born: November 5, 1893; Renda Parish, Courland, Russia
- Died: June 9, 1981 (aged 87); Reģi, Kuldīga district, Latvian SSR, Soviet Union
- Spouse: Robert Freudenfeld
- Military career
- Allegiance: Russia; Latvia
- Branch: Imperial Russian Army; Latvian Land Forces
- Service years: 1915 – 1920
- Rank: Kaprālis
- Nickname: "Jānis Čanka"
- Units: 3rd Kurzeme Latvian Rifle Regiment; 5th Cēsis Infantry Regiment
- Conflicts: World War I; Eastern Front; Christmas Battles; Latvian War of Independence

Līna Čanka was a Latvian Corporal of World War I and Latvian War of Independence. She was within the 3rd Kurzeme Latvian Rifle Regiment under the pseudonym of "Jānis Čanka" and was known as the first woman to be a recipient of the Order of Lāčplēsis, the highest military award of Latvia.

== Military career ==
Līna Čanka was born on November 5, 1893, in an agricultural family of the farm "Mežziles" within the vicinity of the Renda Parish with 4 sisters and 1 brother. At the beginning of World War I, her family went as refugees to Ukraine, but Līna stayed in Riga where with her deceased brother's documents and the nickname "Jānis", she voluntarily joined the Latvian Riflemen. She then enlisted in the 3rd Kurzeme Latvian Rifle Regiment and participated in all the battles of the regiment on the Riga front. During the war, she'd often repeat the phrase:

I wish you knew how beautiful it is in the positions. The music of the crackling shrapnel and grenades - it cannot be described, it can only be felt, enjoyed . When there is no shooting for a while, everyone walks as if dead, but starts shooting - just like at a concert.

After her true sex was revealed in 1915, she continued to serve within the Pavasaru manor in Sloka and despite being wounded, she remained in the frontlines and continued the battle under continuous enemy fire until she was wounded a second time. In 1916, she participated in all the battles for the defense of Nāves Sala in the summer and fought in the Christmas Battles at Tīreļpurvs, as a senior paramedic and selflessly continued her service under continuous enemy fire. During her service within Russia, she was awarded the Order of Saint George, III and IV class as well as promoted to the rank of corporal.

After the departure of the Latvian Riflemen to Russia and the collapse of the front, she remained in Latvia and voluntarily joined the Latvian army in September 1919 and served in the 5th Cēsis Infantry Regiment.

== Retirement and Burial ==
She retired in 1920 and in May 1921, received a new farm in Lielrendas named "Virsaiši" where she became a farmer during the era of Latvian independence. She also received the Order of Lāčplēsis, III Class in 1921 and in 1927, she was awarded the Order of the Three Stars, IV Class. She later married Robert Freudenfeld. During the Great Depression however, she got into financial debt and had to take a loan in order to pay off the debt but when she had to pay off the loan, despite going for the Council of the Military Order of Lāčplēsis for financial aid, the debt was too great and was forced to sell her farm in 1934 and had to settle for a smaller one at Kannieniekos, Matkule Parish.

Her new property didn't last long either as it was sold in 1937 and bought an even smaller farm called "Laimas" at Milzkalne Parish, Tukuma district. They then sold that farm in favor of "Eglītes" in the Zalenieki Parish. During the late 1930s, it was reported that Čanka willingly stayed away from public life, preferring to live a simpler life with her husband. After the outbreak of World War II, her foster son enlisted in the Latvian SS Volunteer Legion and Čanka opened a canteen for the legionnaires along with her husband as well as delivering supplies of food and goods to Latvian legionnaires serving in the Eastern Front.

After the Second World War, she became a repressed citizen of the Latvian SSR, losing all of her property. She spent the rest of her life in the Reģi nursing home in Kuldīga district where she would die on June 9, 1981. In 1989, she was reburied in her family cemetery in Renda Parish.
