= Letter of 17 Latvian communists =

Letter of 17 Latvian communists (Russian: Письмо 17 латышских коммунистов, Latvian: 17 latviešu komunistu vēstule) was an anonymous protest letter written in Russian from 1968 to 1971 by the former deputy chairman of the Council of Ministers of Latvian SSR Eduards Berklavs and distributed with the permission of 16 of his supporters from the Communist Party of Latvia. The same year it was smuggled outside the Soviet Union and published in the Western media in 1972.

The letter accused the Communist Party of the Soviet Union of "Great Russian chauvinism" and the "forced assimilation" of Latvians and other non-Russian people of the Soviet Union. It describes the Soviet effort to settle as many Russians, Belarusians and Ukrainians into Latvian SSR and other Baltic republics as possible and the resulting skewed ethnic composition and low Latvian language proficiency among certain professions such as industrial workers, engineers, technicians, directors of industrial enterprises, officials and doctors among other things.
