= Wilhelm Neumann =

Baltic German architect and art historian (1849–1919)

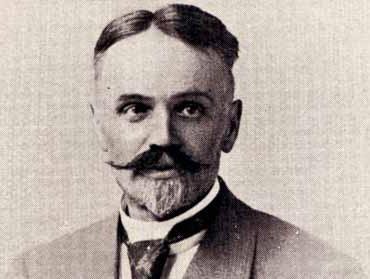
- Born: October 5, 1849; Grevesmühlen, Grand Duchy of Mecklenburg-Schwerin (Now: Germany)
- Died: March 6, 1919 (aged 69); Riga, Latvia
- Known for: architecture, art history
- Movement: Historicism

Carl Johann Wilhelm Neumann (Latvian: Kārlis Johans Vilhelms Neimanis; Russian: Карл Иоганн Вильгельм Нейман; born 5 October 1849 in Grevesmühlen – died 6 March 1919 in Riga) was a Baltic German architect and art historian.

Neumann's family moved to Kreutzburg (then in Russian Empire) during Wilhelm's childhood. When he was 15 years old, he worked as an apprentice at Paul Max Bertschy's engineering office during the construction of the Riga–Dünaburg Railway. After this he studied at the Riga Polytechnicum, and beginning 1875 at the Imperial Academy of Arts in Saint Petersburg.

Beginning 1873 Neumann worked as an architect in Dünaburg (Daugavpils), and 1878 he was promoted to be chief architect of Dünaburg. In 1887 he began to publish art historical publications. In 1895 he moved to Riga, where numerous prominent buildings in the style of historicism was created, amongst these the Peitav Synagogue. Furthermore, Neumann was the planner of many manor buildings in the Baltic governorates and public buildings such as Kurland Provincial Museum and Athenaeum.

Between 1899 and 1901 Neumann taught at the polytechnicum. In 1905 he became director of the Riga Art Museum, a building that was designed by himself. After 1906 Neumann focused on his art historical works.

Neumann died on 6 March 1919 at the age of 69.

== Gallery ==
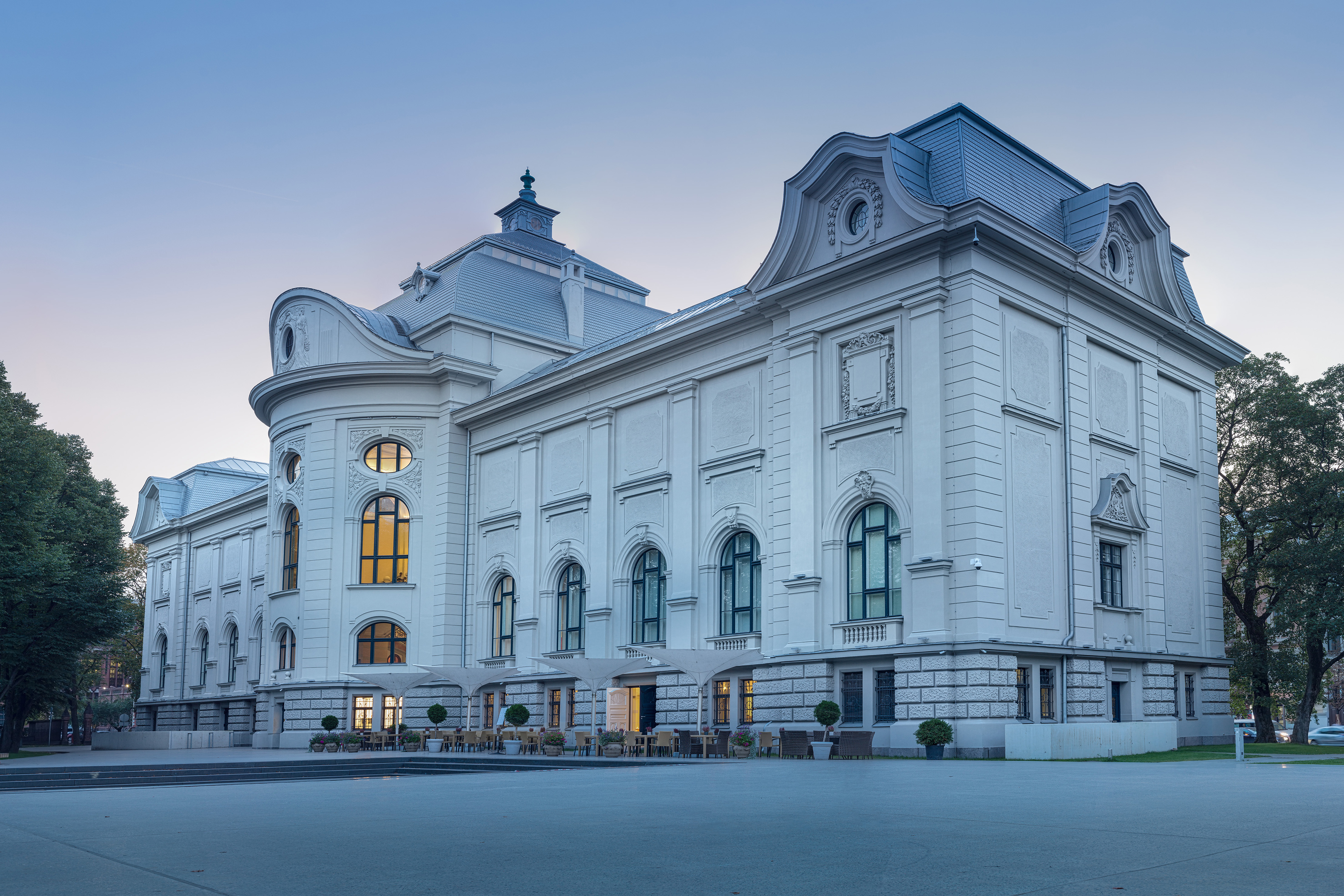
Building of the Latvian National Museum of Arts (1905)

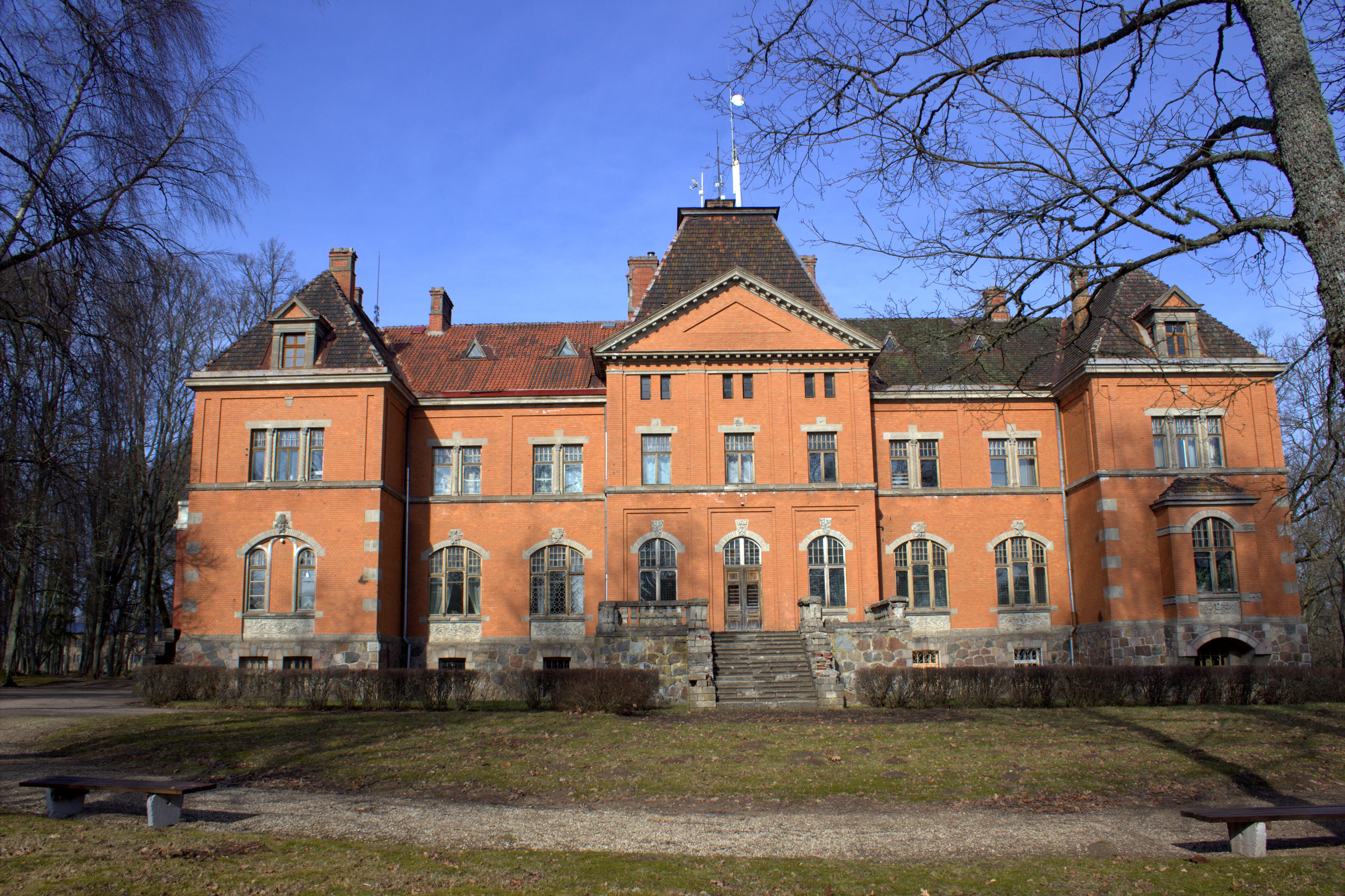
Pelči Palace (1903-1904)

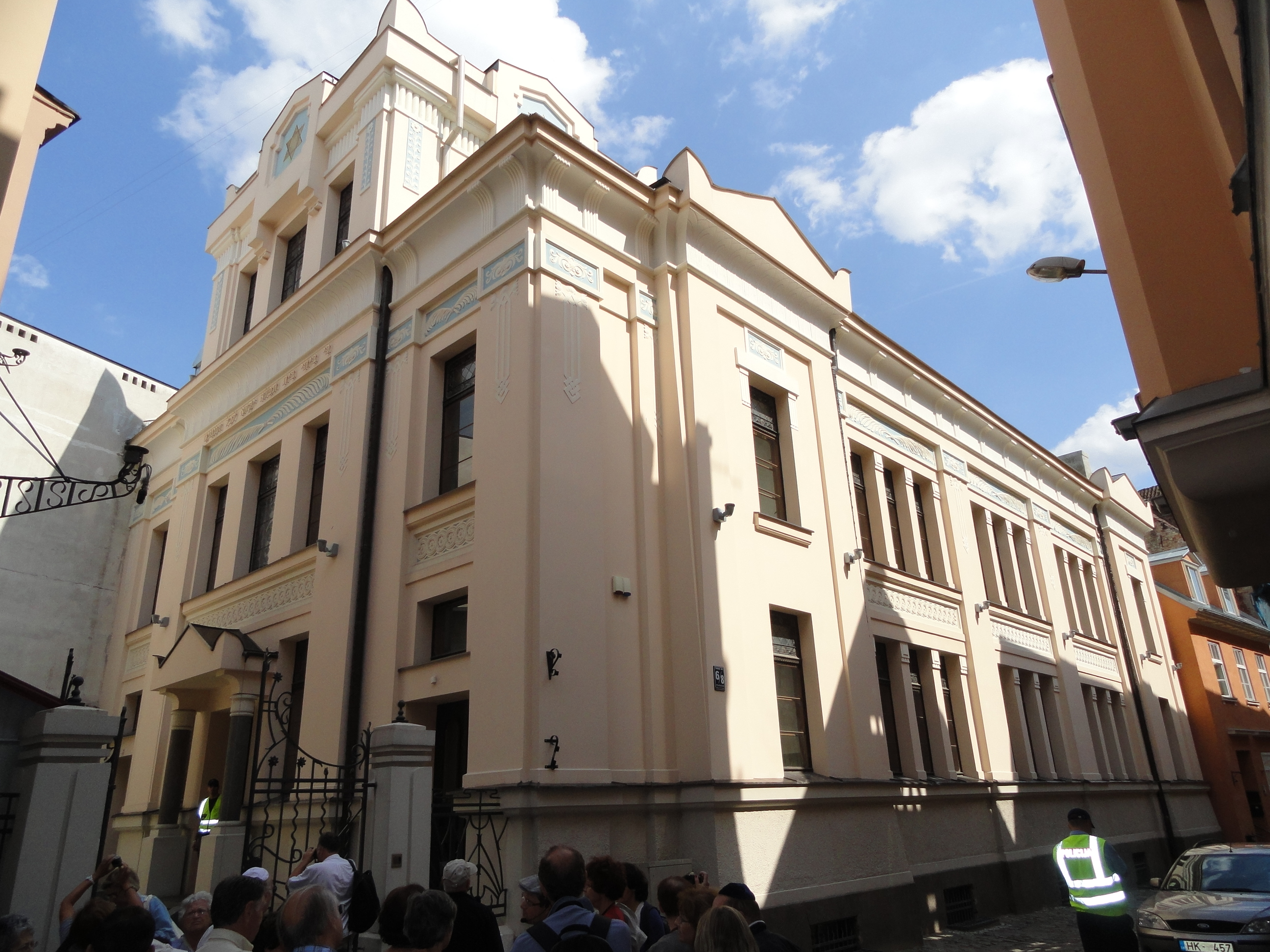
Peitav Synagogue in Riga (1903-1905)

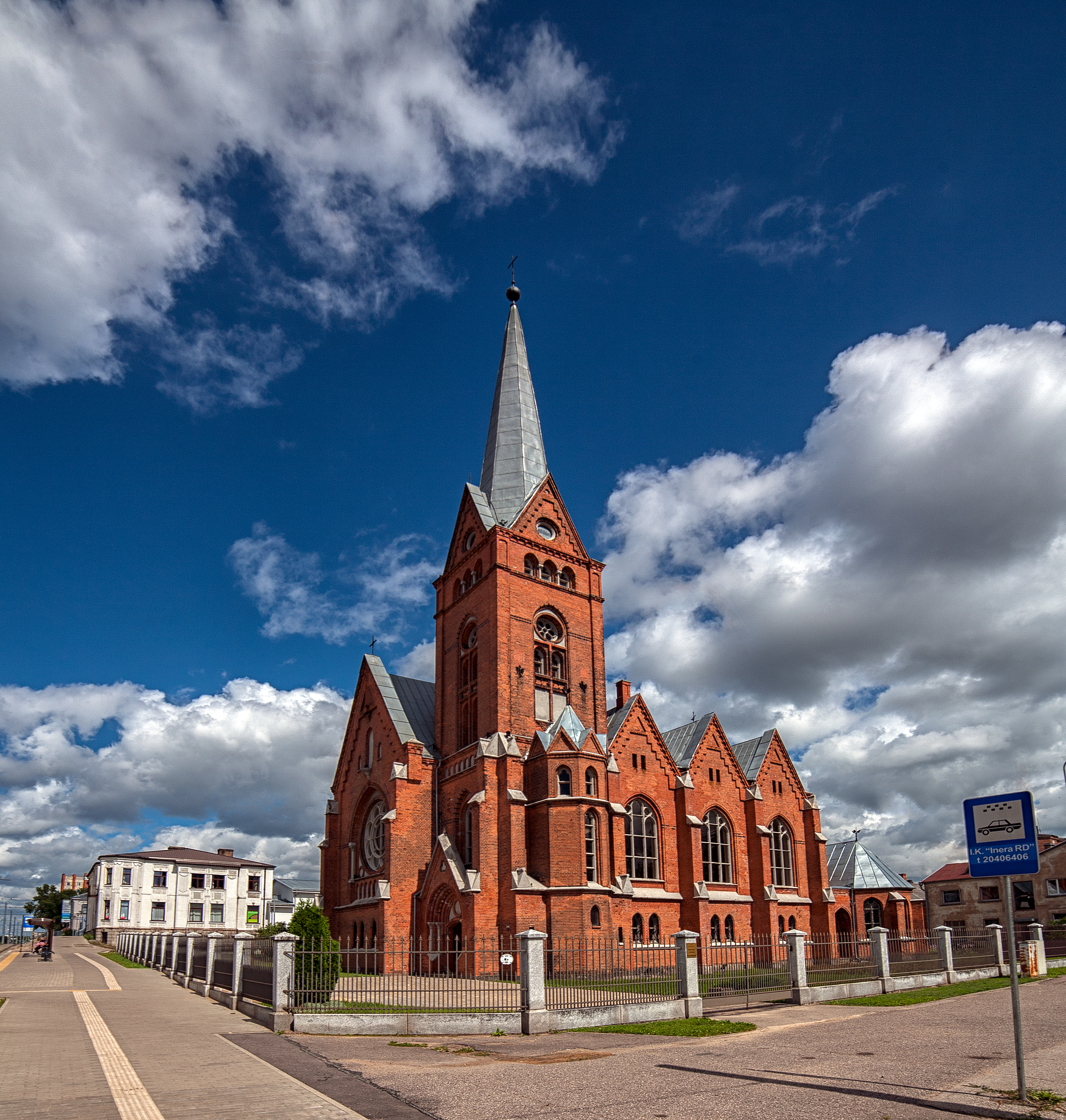
Evangelical Lutheran Church of Martin Luther in Daugavpils (1893)

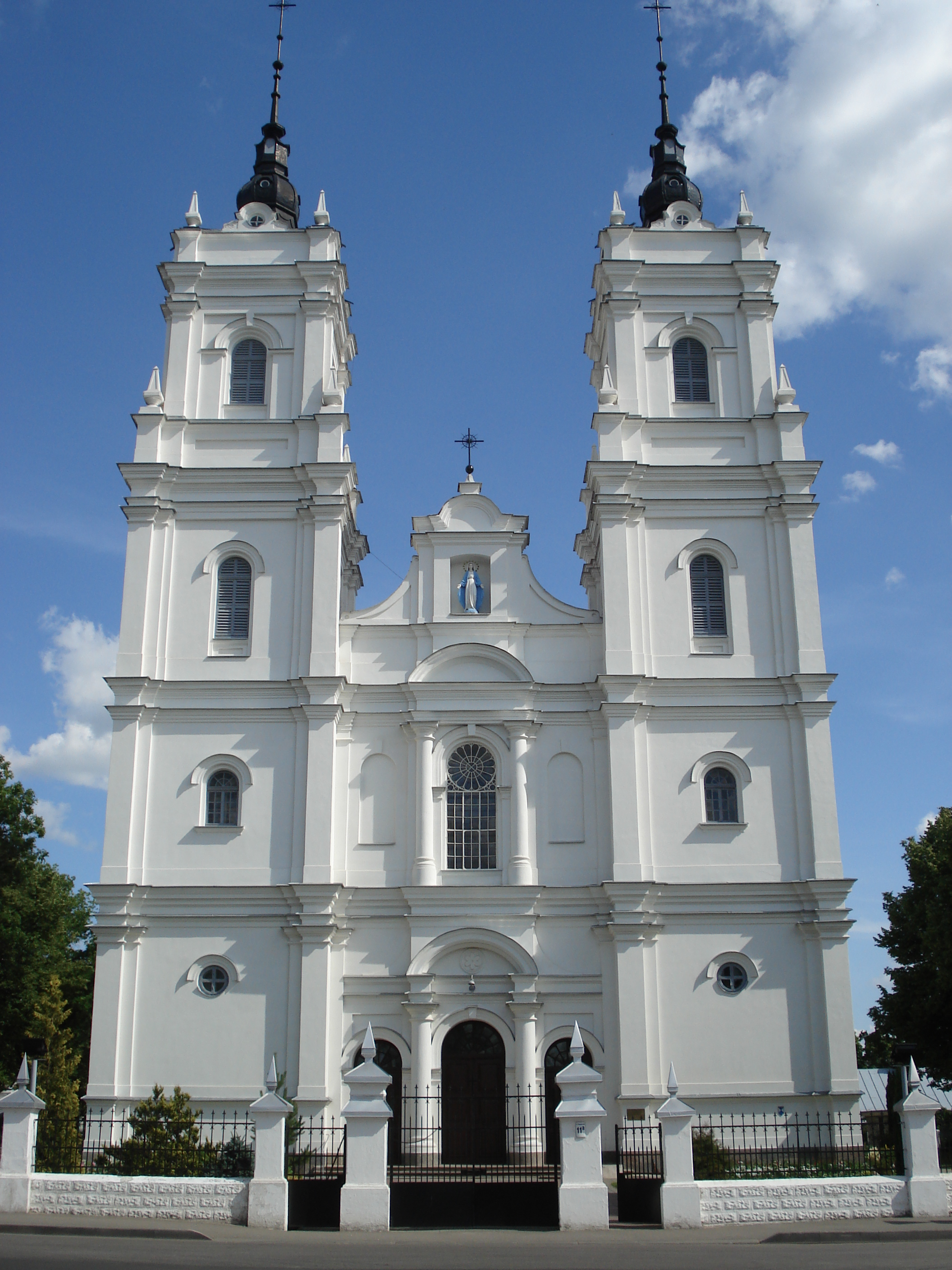
Roman Catholic Church of the Immaculate Conception of Blessed Virgin Mary in Daugavpils (1903–1905)

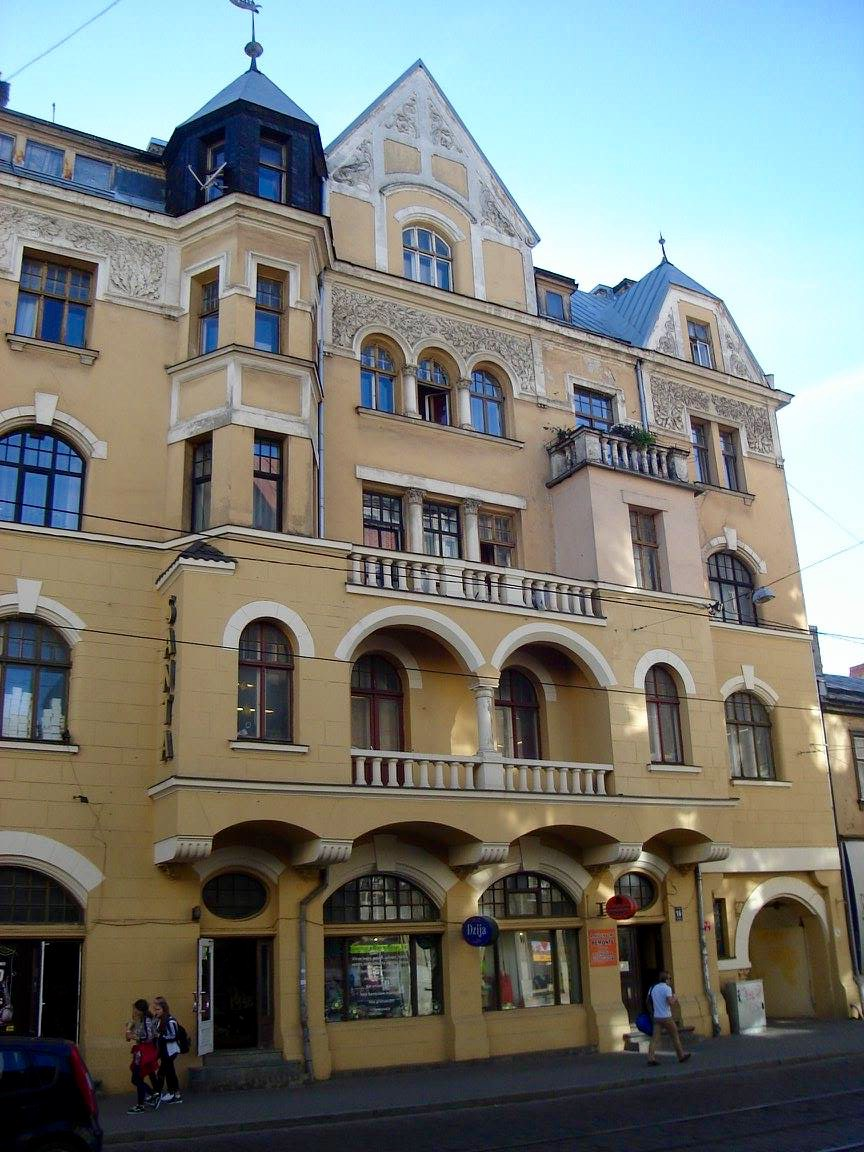
Residential building on the Matīsa street 16, Riga. (1902).

== Literature ==
- E. Grosmane. Vilhelms Neimanis Latvijas mākslas vēsturē., Rīga, 1991, 7.-21. lpp.
- Jānis Krastiņš. Rīgas arhitektūras meistari 1850–1940, Jumava, 2002
- Peter Wörster: „Der Vater der baltischen Kunstgeschichte“. Wilhelm Neumann – Architekt, Kunsthistoriker und Denkmalpfleger. In: Jahrbuch des baltischen Deutschtums, Bd. 55 (2008), Lüneburg 2007, S. 83-100.
