= Ēdole Parish =

Parish of Latvia

- parish of Latvia
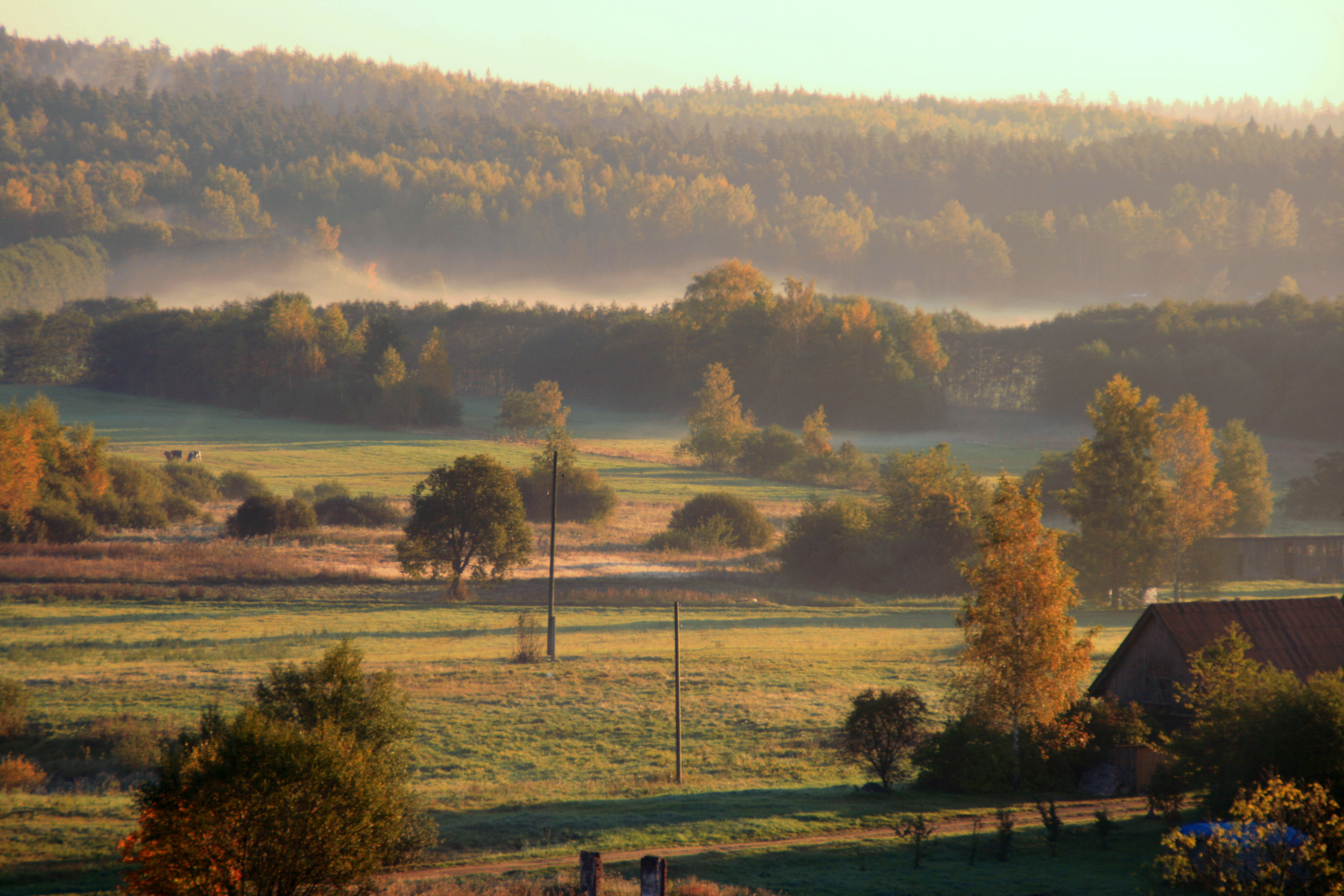
- Foggy morning in Ēdole.

- Coat of arms

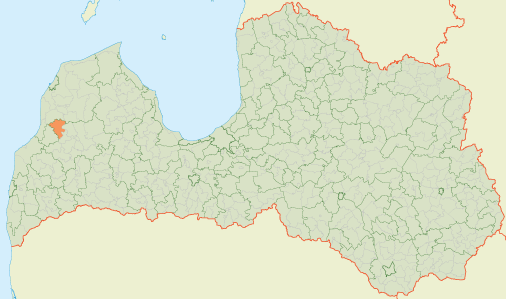
- Coordinates: 57°03′03″N 21°41′04″E
- Country: Latvia

Population (1 January 2026)
  - Total: 741
- Time zone: Eastern European Time
- Postal codes: LV-3310, LV-3313

Ēdole Parish (Latvian: Ēdoles pagasts) is an administrative unit of Kuldīga Municipality in the Courland region of Latvia. The parish has a population of 1021 (as of 1/07/2010) and covers an area of 144.49 km^{2}.

== History ==
In the territory of modern Ēdole parish, Ēdole manor (German: Gut Edwahlen) and Post manor (German: Gut Possenhofen) were historically located. In 1935, the area of Ēdole Parish of Ventspils district was 162.5 km² and 2191 inhabitants lived there. In 1945, Selsoviets, the soviet village councils were established in Ēdole, Kāpu and Tērande, but in 1949 they were liquidated. The village of Ēdole belonged to Alsunga (1949-1956) and after 1956 to Kuldīga districts. The village of Ēdole was joined in 1951 by the liquidated Kāpu village and the territory of the Mērurins kolkhoz in the Tērande village, and in 1977 by the liquidated Īvande village. In 1990, the village was reorganized into a parish. In 1992, Īvande Parish separated from Ēdole Parish. In 2009, Ēdole parish was included as an administrative territory in Kuldīga Municipality.

== Villages of Ēdole parish ==
- Ēdole (parish center)
- Mātras

== See also ==
- Ēdole Castle
