= Mārtiņš Peniķis =

Latvian general

- Born: November 6, 1874; Turlava Parish, Russian Empire (Now Latvia)
- Died: February 18, 1964 (aged 89); Riga, Latvian SSR
- Military career
- Allegiance: Russian Empire; Latvia
- Branch: Army
- Rank: General
- Conflicts: Russo Japanese War; World War I Latvian War of Independence
- Awards: Order of St. Stanislaus; Order of St. Anna; Order of St. George; St. George Sword; Order of Lāčplēsis; Order of the Three Stars; French Order of the Legion of Honour; Order of Polonia Restituta; Estonian Cross of Liberty; Lithuanian Order of Vytis; Finnish Order of the White Rose; Order of the White Eagle

Mārtiņš Peniķis (6 November 1874 – 18 February 1964) was a Latvian general and commander in chief of Latvian Army from 1928 to 1934. He was awarded with Order of Lāčplēsis and Order of the Three stars.

== Biography ==
Mārtiņš Peniķis was born 6 November 1874 at Atālmauli homestead, Turlava Parish, Courland Governorate in an ancient family of Curonian Kings. He studied at the Kuldīga city school.

In 1896, he enlisted in the Russian Imperial Army and served in the 133rd Simferopole Infantry Regiment. In 1900 he started studies in the war school and graduated in 1902. He was promoted to the rank of podporuchik and deployed to 121st Harkov Infantry Regiment. During the Russo-Japanese War he saw action in many battles including the Battle of Mukden. In 1913 he was admitted to the Nikolai Military Academy.

=== First World war ===
In the early stages of the First World War, Peniķis served as a company commander in Galicia and in battles around Kraków. He was wounded in December 1914. In 1915, he was promoted to the rank of colonel and participated in battles in Belorussia. In autumn of 1916 he was transferred to the Latvian Rifleman units and became commander of 2nd Riga Latvian Rifleman Regiment. He led his regiment in the Christmas Battles and at the Battle of Jugla in autumn of 1917. After the October Revolution, Peniķis left the army and stayed in German-occupied Vidzeme, where he was interned. He was released in November 1918.

=== Latvian War of Independence ===
In December 1918, he enlisted in the new Latvian Army and became the commander of Courland Military District. In June 1919, he became commander of all Latvian units around Liepāja. In September he became chief of the all military schools but when the attack of the Bermontians started he returned to active service. He became commander of the 2nd Vidzeme Infantry Division and replaced Jorģis Zemitāns as commander of the southern front. On 10 November, his division started a massive counterattack and liberated Torņakalns and other parts of Pārdaugava. Later he participated in the liberation of Latgale. In August 1920, Peniķis was promoted to general and became chief of the staff of the Latvian Army.

=== Later life ===
From 1921 to 1924, Peniķis was general inspector of the army. From 1928 to 1934, he was commander in chief of the Latvian Army. In 1934, he reached the maximum service age and retired. In retirement he researched Latvian history and worked as military lecturer. He has published several books about military history.

During the Nazi occupation of Latvia in the World War II Peniķis was offered the post of general inspector of a newly formed Latvian Legion however he refused the offer. At the end of the Second World War he emigrated to Germany however, in 1945, he decided to return to the new Latvian Soviet Socialist Republic. He was not repressed and continued to research military history. Mārtiņš Peniķis died on 18 February 1964 at the age of 89 in Riga. He is buried at the Riga Forest Cemetery.

== Awards ==
- Latvia: Order of the Three Stars, 1st Class (14 Nov 1928)
