= Curonians =

Medieval Baltic tribe

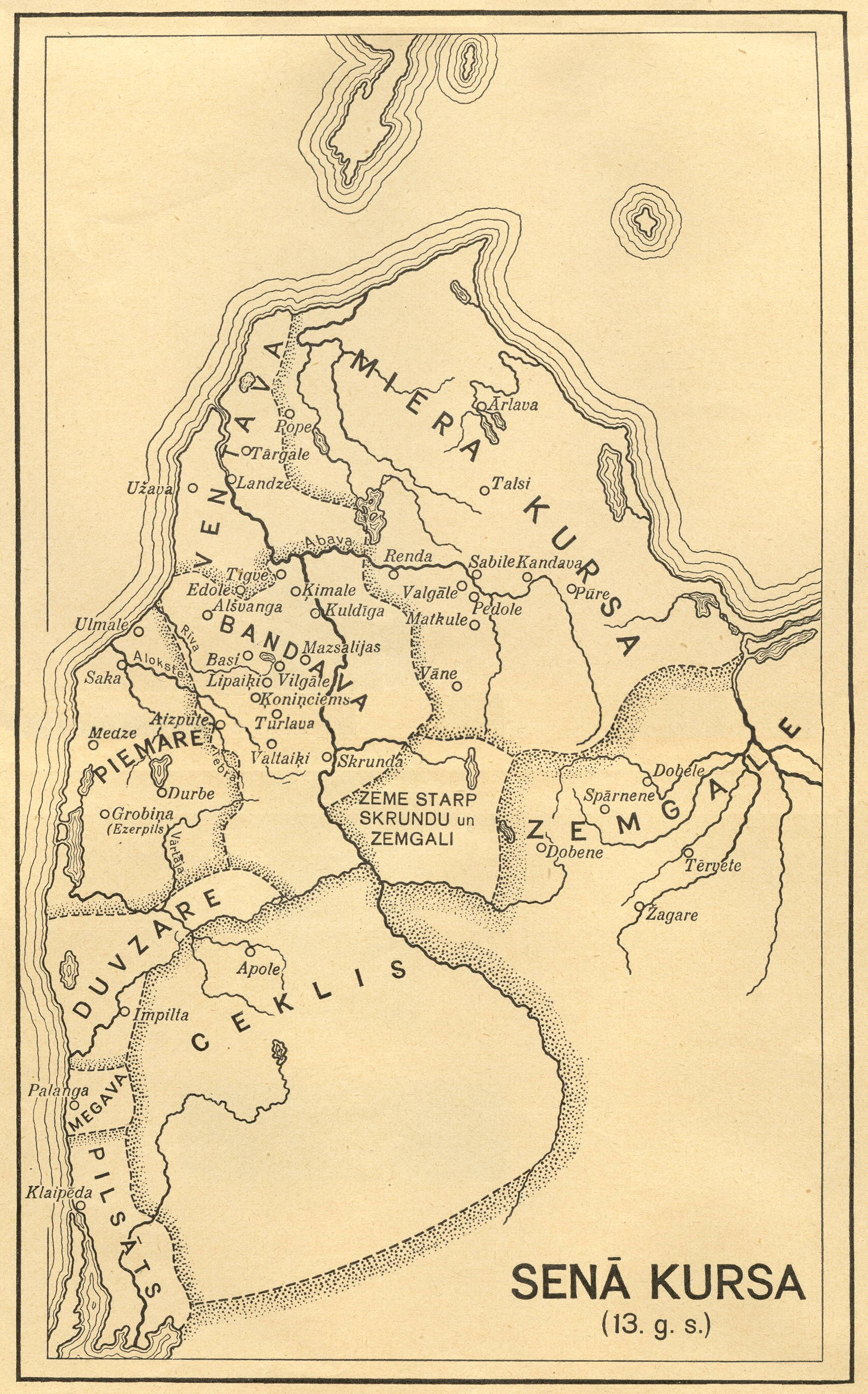
Curonian lands by the start of 13th century

The Curonians (Latvian: kurši; Lithuanian: kuršiai) or Kurs (obsolete) were a medieval Baltic tribe living on the shores of the Baltic Sea in the 5th–16th centuries, in what are now western parts of Latvia and Lithuania. They eventually merged with other Baltic tribes contributing to the ethnogenesis of present-day Latvians and Lithuanians. Curonians gave their name to the region of Courland (Kurzeme), the town of Kuršėnai, the Curonian spit and many other localities. They spoke the Curonian language.

== Origin ==
The ethnic origin of the Curonians has been disputed in the past. Some researchers place the Curonians in the eastern Baltic group. Others hold that the Curonians were related to Old Prussians who belonged in the western Baltic group.

== History ==
Curonians in the context of the other Baltic tribes, circa 1200 CE. The Eastern Balts are shown in a brown hue while the Western Balts are shown in green. The boundaries are approximate.

The historical Curonians (Note: German: Kuren; Old Norse: Kúrir; Old East Slavic: кърсь) were described in contemporary sources as warriors, sailors and pirates. They are on the record having been involved in several wars and alliances with Swedish, Danish and Icelandic Vikings.

In c. 750, according to Norna-Gests þáttr saga from c. 1157, Sigurd Ring, a legendary king of Denmark and Sweden, fought against the invading Curonians and Kvens (Kvænir) in the southern part of what today is Sweden:

Sigurd Ring (Sigurðr) was not there, since he had to defend his land, Sweden (Svíþjóð), since Curonians (Kúrir) and Kvænir were raiding there.

—

Curonians are mentioned among other participants of the Battle of Brávellir.

Grobin (Grobiņa) was the main centre of the Curonians during the Vendel Age. Chapter 46 of Egils Saga describes one Viking expedition by the Vikings Thorolf and Egill Skallagrímsson in Courland. Curonians established temporary settlements near Riga and in overseas regions including eastern Sweden and the islands of Gotland and Bornholm.

Rimbert in his Vita Ansgari described early conflicts between the Curonians and vikings. In 854, Curonians rebelled and refused to pay tribute to Sweden. The rebellious Apuolė fortress was first attacked by the Danes, who were hoping to make the town pay tribute to Denmark. The locals were victorious and gained much war loot. After learning of Danish failure, King Olof of Sweden organized a large expedition into Curonian lands. Olof first attacked, captured, and burned Grobiņa before besieging Apuolė. According to Rimbert, 15,000 locals defended themselves for eight days but then agreed to surrender: the Curonians paid a silver ransom for each man in the fortress, pledged their loyalty to Sweden, and gave 30 hostages to guarantee future payments.

The Curonians had a strong warrior culture and are considered to be eastern Baltic by some researchers, while others believe they were related to Old Prussians who belonged in the western Baltic group.

Some of the most important written sources about the Curonians are Rimbert's Vita Ansgarii, the Livonian Chronicle of Henry, the Livländische Reimchronik, Egils Saga, and Saxo Grammaticus's Gesta Danorum. In c. 1075 Adam of Bremen described the Curonians in his Gesta Hammaburgensis Ecclesiae Pontificum (Deeds of Bishops of the Hamburg Church) as world-famous pagan diviners:

... gold is very plentiful there, the horses are of the best. All the houses are full of pagan soothsayers, diviners, and necromancers, who are even arrayed in a monastic habit. Oracular responses are sought there from all parts of the world, especially by Spaniards and Greeks.

—

It was common for the Curonians to carry out joint raids and campaigns together with Estonians (Oeselians). According to some opinions, they took part in attacking Sweden's main city Sigtuna in 1187. During the Livonian crusade, Curonians formed an alliance with the Semigallians, resulting in a joint attack against Riga in 1228. In the same time, according to the Livonian Rhymed Chronicle, Curonians and Samogitians were known as "bad neighbours".

In the middle of the 13th century, the Curonian army included lightly armed soldiers who fought with spears, shields, fighting knives and axes, formed into an infantry platoon. Archers constituted a separate segment of an army. A heavily armed soldier could have a sword, a helmet, a shield and a wide blade axe. Heavily armed troops would make a cavalry platoon.

=== Livonian Crusade ===
During the late Iron Age, the Curonians started to move from southern Courland to the north, assimilating a Finnic people who lived in northern Courland. They then formed a new ethnic group, the so-called Curonised Livonians.

The Curonians tightly resisted to the Livonian Crusade for a long time, contrary to the Latgallians who accepted Christianity with only light opposition.

Also in July 1210, the Curonians attacked Riga, the main crusader stronghold in Livonia. A huge Curonian fleet arrived in the mouth of the Daugava and besieged the city. However, after a day of fighting, the Curonians were unable to break through the city walls. They crossed to the other bank of the Daugava to burn their dead and mourn for three days. Later they lifted the siege and returned to Courland.

In 1228, the Curonians together with the Semigallians again attacked Riga. Although they were again unsuccessful in storming the city, they destroyed a monastery in Daugavgriva and killed all the monks there.

In 1230, the Curonians in the northern part of Courland, under their ruler (rex) Lammekinus, signed a peace treaty with the Germans, and the lands they inhabited thus became known as Vredecuronia or Peace Courland. The southern Curonians, however, continued to resist the invaders.

The Curonians did not lay down their arms at that time. They used the famine as a pretext for claiming economical weakness and actually did not permit the monks to enter the country. Later, the Teutonic Order tried to use Curonian cavalry in the Prussian Crusade, but Curonians were reluctant in this forced cooperation and revolted as a result in several cases.

In 1260, the Curonians were involved in the Battle of Durbe, one of the biggest battles in Livonia in the 13th century. They were forced to fight on the crusader side. When the battle started, the Curonians abandoned the knights because the knights did not agree to free any Curonians captured from the Samogitian camp. Peter von Dusburg alleged that the Curonians even attacked the Knights from the rear. The Estonians and other local people soon followed the Curonians and abandoned the Knights and that allowed the Samogitians to gain victory over the Livonian Order. It was a heavy defeat for the Order and uprisings against the crusaders soon afterwards broke out in the Curonian and Prussian lands.

Curonian resistance was finally subdued in 1266 when the whole of Courland was partitioned between the Livonian Order and the Archbishop of Riga.

=== Later history ===
Southern Curonians from Megowa, Pilsaten and Ceclis lands gradually assimilated and ceased to be known as a distinct ethnos by the 16th century. An intense period of Samogitian-Curonian bilingualism is posited because a Curonian linguistic substratum is evident in the Northern Samogitian dialect, an important part of Samogitian ethnic self-identification.

On the Latvian side during the Livonian War, the descendants of the Curonian nobility, although downgraded to peasant status, fought the Russians, as Johann Renner's chronicle reports:

The Russians protected themselves boldly, and they knocked out a Curonian peasant Fenrich (who, although only a peasant, is called by them the Curonian king) from his horse.

— Johann Renner, Lievländische Historien, 1556–1561, C. 124v

The Curonian language became extinct by the 16th century.

Curonia, as reported, had its own language, different from the Latvian and Estonian, which is extirpated and prohibited, so that nobody has the right to talk it, and instead has to speak Latvian.

— Johann Renner, Lievländische Historien, 1556–1561, 207v

== Geography ==
Map of Courland

Bishop Rimbert of Bremen (lived before 888 AD) in his life of St. Ansgar, Vita Ansgarii described the territory inhabited by the Curonians (Cori) and gave the names of the administrative districts or lands (civitates):

- Vredecuronia or Vanemane was the land in the northeast of Courland, today in the district of Talsi.
- Wynda or Ventava was the land around the mouth of the river Venta, today in the district of Ventspils.
- Bandowe (Bandava) south of Vindava, is today in the district of Kuldīga.
- Bihavelanc or Piemare, also south of Bandava, is today in the district of Liepāja.
- Powsare (Dovsare) or Duvzare was a land further south in Courland, today in the district of Liepāja.
- Megowa or Megava (mentioned also as Negouwe in chronicles) 500 km^{2}, was in the environs of modern Palanga, Kretinga and Šventoji.
- Pilsaten or Pilsotas was the smallest region of around 200 km^{2}, in the western part of modern Klaipėda district and northwestern part of Šilutė district.
- Ceclis or Ceklis – the largest land of 1500 km^{2} west of the river Venta in Samogitia, up to the Lithuanian-Latvian border.

== Sources ==
- Mägi, Marika (2018). In Austrvegr: The Role of the Eastern Baltic in Viking Age Communication across the Baltic Sea. BRILL. ISBN 9789004363816.
- Žulkus, Vladas (2011). "Settlements and piracy on the eastern shore of the Baltic Sea: the Middle Ages to modern times" (PDF). Archaeologia Baltica. 16: 58–71. doi:10.15181/ab.v16i0.34. ISSN 1392-5520.
