= Eduards Berklavs =

Latvian politician

Eduards Berklavs (June 15, 1914 – November 25, 2004) was a Soviet and Latvian politician.

Eduards Berklavs was born in Kurmāle Parish, which is part of the Kuldīga Municipality as of today. During his youth, he was active in labour and communist organizations. In the 1930s, he was arrested and served a prison sentence for his communist activities. After Latvia was occupied by the Soviet Union in the 1940, Berklavs, with a background as a Komsomol and Communist Party official, rose to become the deputy chairman of the Council of Ministers of Latvian SSR in the 1950s. In this position, he opposed the Soviet policies of Russification, supported a larger role for the Latvian language, and proposed to limit immigration from other parts of the Soviet Union to Latvia. This led to him being labelled as Latvian nationalist and deposed from his position in 1959. He later wrote the Letter of 17 Latvian communists, where he accused the Soviet government of "Great Russian chauvinism" and the "forced assimilation".

In the late 1980s, Berklavs became a Latvian independence activist. He was one of the founders and the first chairman of Latvian National Independence Movement (LNNK), a pro-independence political organization. He was simultaneously active in Latvian Popular Front and the Congress of Citizens of Latvia. During this period, Berklavs was one of the most prominent independence activists. He was elected to the Latvian parliament in 1990 and 1993; on both occasions he was the oldest member of the parliament.
