= Rudbārži Parish =

Parish of Latvia

- parish of Latvia
- Coat of arms

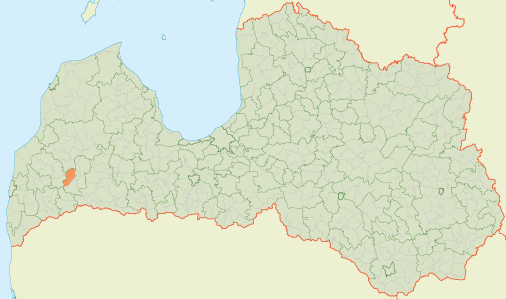
- 56°39′14″N 21°52′45″E

- Location within Latvia
- Country: Latvia

Area
  - Total: 110.54 km^{2} (42.68 sq mi)
  - Land: 107.5 km^{2} (41.5 sq mi)
  - Water: 3.04 km^{2} (1.17 sq mi)

Population (1 January 2026)
  - Total: 701
  - Density: 6.52/km^{2} (16.9/sq mi)

Rudbārži Parish (Latvian: Rudbāržu pagasts) is an administrative unit of Kuldīga Municipality in the Courland region of Latvia. The parish has a population of 1074 (as of 1/07/2010) and covers an area of 110.42 km^{2}.

== Villages of Rudbārži parish ==
- Internātskola (Dzirnavas)
- Jaunsieksāte
- Kandeļi
- Kokapuze
- Laukmuiža
- Ļūdikas
- Marijas muiža
- Pansionāts (Grenčukrogs)
- Pelči
- Rudbārži
- Sieksāte (Kalnmuiža)
- Vecsieksāte
- Vidsmuiža
- Zaļumi
