= Snēpele Parish =

Parish of Latvia

- parish of Latvia
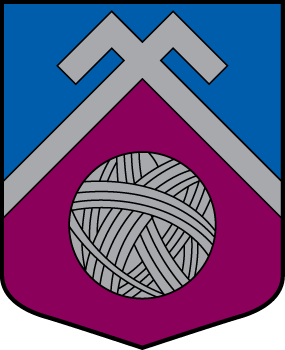
- Coat of arms

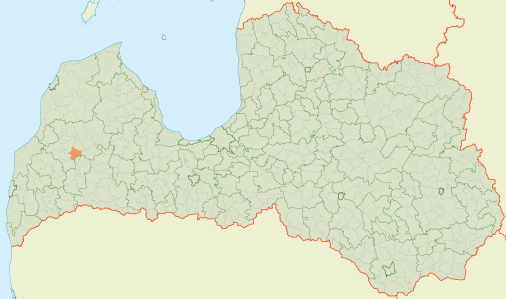
- 56°50′37″N 21°56′48″E

- Location within Latvia
- Country: Latvia

Area
  - Total: 76.96 km^{2} (29.71 sq mi)
  - Land: 74.18 km^{2} (28.64 sq mi)
  - Water: 2.78 km^{2} (1.07 sq mi)

Population (1 January 2026)
  - Total: 642
  - Density: 8.65/km^{2} (22.4/sq mi)

Snēpele parish (Latvian: Snēpeles pagasts) is an administrative unit of Kuldīga Municipality in the Courland region of Latvia. The parish has a population of 815 (as of 1/07/2010) and covers an area of 76.94 km^{2}.

== Villages of Snēpele parish ==
- Kundi
- Snēpele
- Viesalgciems

== See also ==
- Curonian Kings
- Snēpele Palace
