= Raņķi Parish =

Parish of Latvia

- parish of Latvia
- Coat of arms

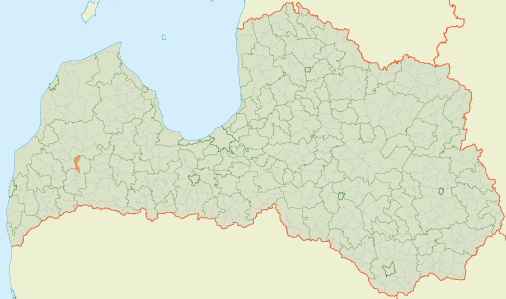
- 56°45′42″N 21°59′07″E
- Country: Latvia

Area
  - Total: 46.81 km^{2} (18.07 sq mi)
  - Land: 44.92 km^{2} (17.34 sq mi)
  - Water: 1.89 km^{2} (0.73 sq mi)

Population (1 January 2024)
  - Total: 351
  - Density: 7.5/km^{2} (19/sq mi)

Raņķi Parish (Latvian: Raņķu pagasts) is an administrative unit of Kuldīga Municipality in the Courland region of Latvia. The parish has a population of 507 (as of 1/07/2010) and covers an area of 46.48 km^{2}.

== Villages of Raņķi parish ==
- Līdumnieki (Skrunda-2)
- Raņķi
- Smilgas
