= Padure Parish =

Parish of Latvia

- parish of Latvia
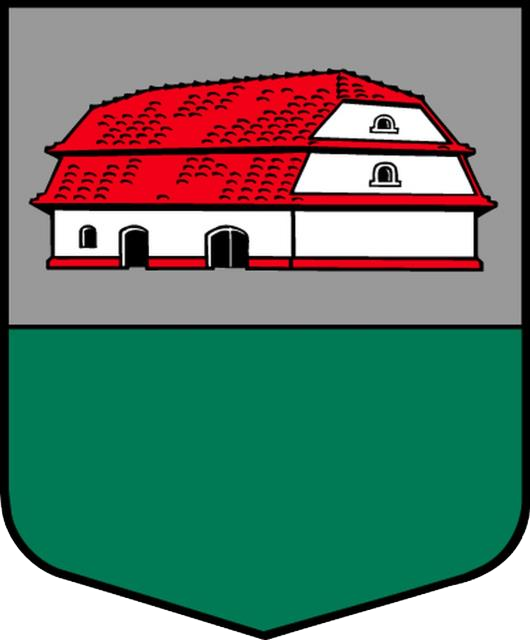
- Coat of arms

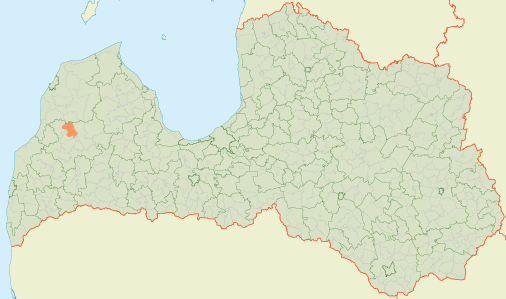
- 57°02′10″N 21°51′52″E

- Location within Latvia
- Country: Latvia

Area
  - Total: 112.98 km^{2} (43.62 sq mi)
  - Land: 108.75 km^{2} (41.99 sq mi)
  - Water: 4.23 km^{2} (1.63 sq mi)

Population (1 January 2026)
  - Total: 971
  - Density: 8.93/km^{2} (23.1/sq mi)

Padure Parish (Latvian: Padures pagasts) is an administrative unit of Kuldīga Municipality in the Courland region of Latvia. The parish has a population of 1134 (as of 1/07/2010) and covers an area of 113.11 km^{2}.

== Villages of Padure parish ==
- Deksne
- Keramika
- Ķimale
- Līzesmuiža
- Padure
- Sausgāļciems
- Vēgas

== Notable sights and places ==
- Padure Manor

== See also ==
- Curonian Kings
