= Order of Lāčplēsis =

Latvian military decoration

Order of Lāčplēsis Lāčplēša Kara ordenis
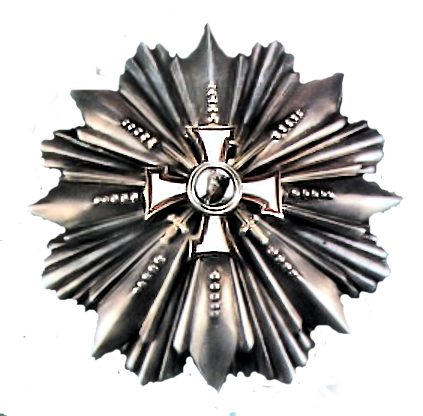
- First class star of the Order
- Type: 3 class Order
- Presented by: Latvia
- Status: No longer awarded
- Established: 11 November 1919
- First award: 11 November 1920
- Final award: 1 November 1928

Highlights
- Total: 2146
- Ribbon of the Order

Precedence
- Next (higher): None
- Next (lower): Order of the Three Stars

The Order of Lāčplēsis (also Lāčplēsis Military Order, Latvian: Lāčplēša Kara ordenis), the first and the highest Latvian military award, was established in 1919 on the initiative of Jānis Balodis, the Commander of the Latvian Army during the Latvian War of Independence. The Lāčplēsis Order is awarded in the first, second and third class. Initially, a holder of the order had to be a recipient of the third class before being promoted to a higher class. It was named after the Latvian epic hero, Lāčplēsis. As a young man, Lāčplēsis kills a bear with his bare hands and thus the order is also known as the Order of the Bearslayer.

== Description ==
The medal of the Lāčplēsis Military Order is a white enameled Thunder and Fire Cross (Latvian left facing swastika) with red and golden edging. In the centre of the obverse there is a medallion with picture of the folk hero Lāčplēsis wrestling with a bear. On the reverse side there is the date 11 November 1919, the date when the Latvian Army expelled the troops of Pavel Bermondt-Avalov from Riga. With the date is also engraved motto of the order "Par Latviju" (For Latvia). Edges of the cross were engraved with initials H.B., the trademark of silversmith Hermanis Banks. The emblem of the order was designed by J. Līberts. The holders received also a diploma, designed by Rihards Zariņš, with a brief description of their achievements.

== History ==
The first award ceremony took place on the Esplanade Square in Riga on 11 November 1920, with President Jānis Čakste personally presenting the decorations to the seven highest-ranking commanders of the Latvian Army, General Pēteris Radziņš, Colonels Mārtiņš Peniķis, Krišjānis Berķis, Jūlijs Jansons and Jānis Apinis and Lieutenant Colonels Oskars Dankers and Jānis Puriņš.

Between 1919 and 1928 the first class was conferred on 11 persons. The second class was awarded to 61 persons (18 Latvians and 43 foreigners). The third class was conferred on 2072 persons (1600 soldiers of the Latvian army, 202 former Latvian riflemen and 271 foreigners). Among the recipients are 136 Estonians, 11 Lithuanians, 47 Germans, 15 Russians, 9 Poles, 4 Jews and 3 Belarusians. Three women – Valija Vesčūnas-Jansone, Līna Čanka, and Elza Žiglevica were holders of the third class of the decoration.

The Military Order of Lāčplēsis was also awarded to foreigners, both common soldiers and high ranking generals and political leaders. Among them were the Commander of the Estonian Army General Johan Laidoner, Pierwszy Marszałek Polski Naczelnik Państwa Józef Piłsudski, Edward Rydz-Śmigły, King Victor Emmanuel III of Italy, Prime Minister Benito Mussolini, King Albert I of Belgium, and French Marshal Ferdinand Foch.

The fortress of Verdun was also awarded the Lāčplēsis Military Order for the heroism of it defenders during World War I.

Order of Lāčplēsis classes
Order of Lāčplēsis First Class	Order of Lāčplēsis 2nd Class	Order of Lāčplēsis 3rd Class

== See also ==
- List of Baltic German recipients of the military Order of Lāčplēsis
