= Gudenieki Parish =

Parish of Latvia

- parish of Latvia
- Coat of arms

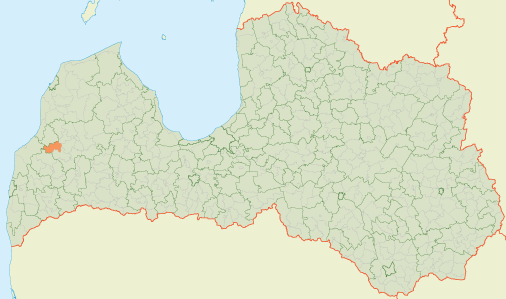
- 56°53′15″N 21°37′10″E
- Country: Latvia

Area
  - Total: 112.28 km^{2} (43.35 sq mi)
  - Land: 109.62 km^{2} (42.32 sq mi)
  - Water: 2.66 km^{2} (1.03 sq mi)

Population (1 January 2024)
  - Total: 477
  - Density: 4.2/km^{2} (11/sq mi)

Gudenieki Parish (Latvian: Gudenieku pagasts) is an administrative unit of Kuldīga Municipality in the Courland region of Latvia. The parish has a population of 798 (as of 1/07/2010) and covers an area of 112.3 km^{2}.

== Villages of Gudenieki parish ==
- Adzes manor
- Basi (Birži)
- Basu manor
- Gudenieki ( parish center )
- Gudenieku manor
- Jaunā muiža
- Ludženieki
