= Aizpute Parish =

Parish in South Kurzeme Municipality, Latvia

- Parish
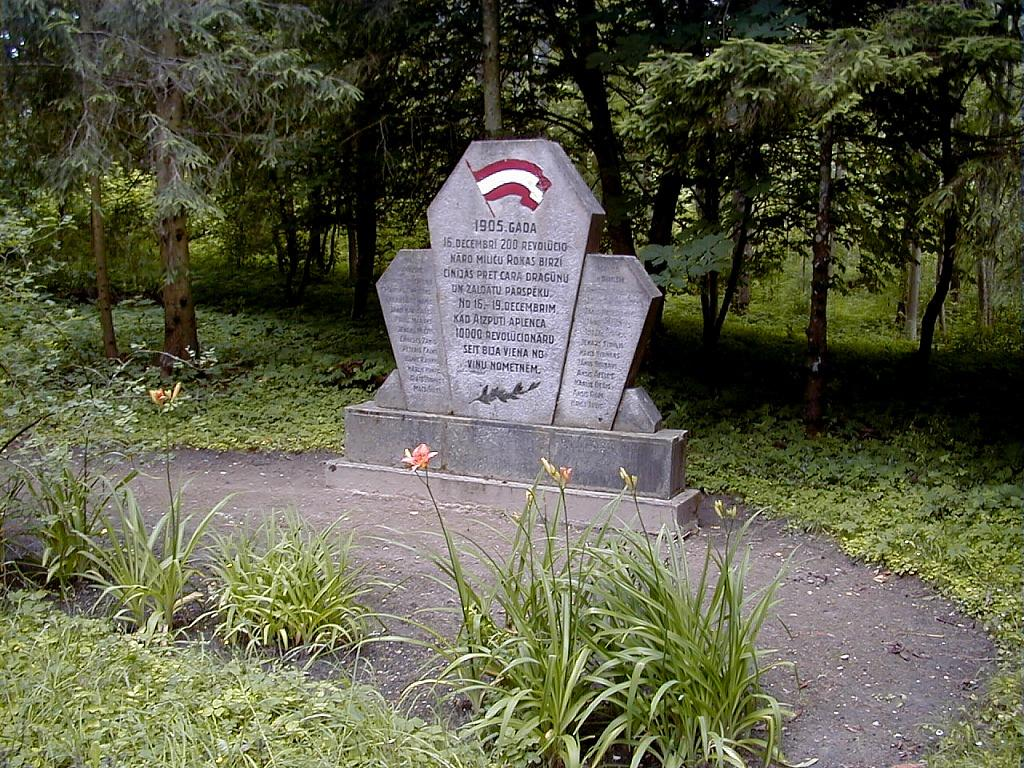
- Monument «Rokasbirzs» (1905)

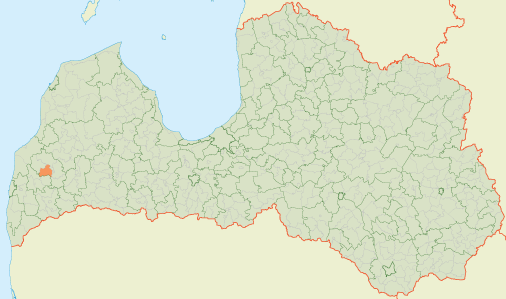
- Coordinates: 56°41′26″N 21°31′33″E
- Country: Latvia

Population (1 January 2026)
  - Total: 731
- Time zone: Eastern European Time
- Postal codes: LV-3441, LV-3456

Aizpute Parish (Latvian: Aizputes pagasts) is an administrative unit of South Kurzeme Municipality, Latvia. The parish has a population of 1003 (as of 1/07/2010) and covers an area of 88.9 km^{2}. The administrative center is Rokasbirze.

== Villages of Aizpute parish ==
- Dubeņmuiža
- Ievade
- Kūdra
- Lavīži
- Mangaļi
- Marijas
- Padure
- Rokasbirze.
