= Laidi Parish =

Parish of Latvia

- parish of Latvia
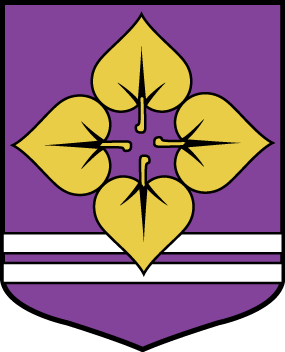
- Coat of arms

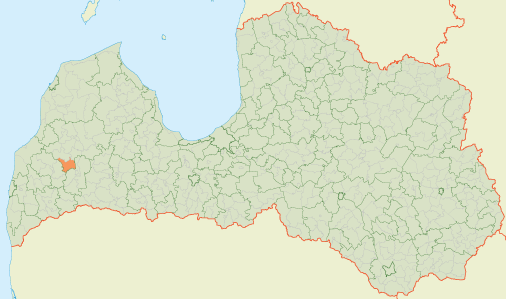
- 56°45′05″N 21°50′28″E

- Location within Latvia
- Country: Latvia

Area
  - Total: 114.89 km^{2} (44.36 sq mi)
  - Land: 110.35 km^{2} (42.61 sq mi)
  - Water: 4.54 km^{2} (1.75 sq mi)

Population (1 January 2026)
  - Total: 871
  - Density: 7.89/km^{2} (20.4/sq mi)

Laidi Parish (Latvian: Laidu pagasts) is an administrative unit of Kuldīga Municipality in the Courland region of Latvia. The parish has a population of 1274 (as of 1/07/2010) and covers an area of 114.97 km^{2}.

== Villages of Laidi parish ==
- Laidi
- Rude
- Sermite
- Valtaiķi
- Vanga
