= Pelči Parish =

Parish of Latvia

- parish of Latvia
- Coat of arms

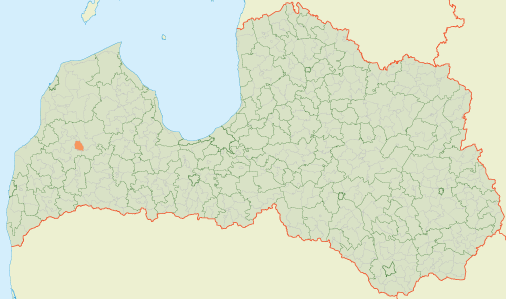
- 56°54′23″N 22°00′05″E

- Location within Latvia
- Country: Latvia

Area
  - Total: 56.61 km^{2} (21.86 sq mi)
  - Land: 53.9 km^{2} (20.8 sq mi)
  - Water: 2.71 km^{2} (1.05 sq mi)

Population (1 January 2026)
  - Total: 959
  - Density: 17.8/km^{2} (46.1/sq mi)

Pelči Parish (Latvian: Pelču pagasts) is an administrative unit of Kuldīga Municipality in the Courland region of Latvia. The parish has a population of 1099 (as of 1/07/2010) and covers an area of 56.57 km^{2}.

== Villages of Pelči parish ==
- Ābele
- Kaltiķi
- Pelči
- Raidstacija
- Rimzātciems
- Skrundenieku ciems
- Slipiņciems
