= Kuldīga Municipality =

Municipality of Latvia

Coordinates: 56.9667°N 21.9667°E

Kuldīga Municipality Kuldīgas novads
- Municipality
- Coat of arms

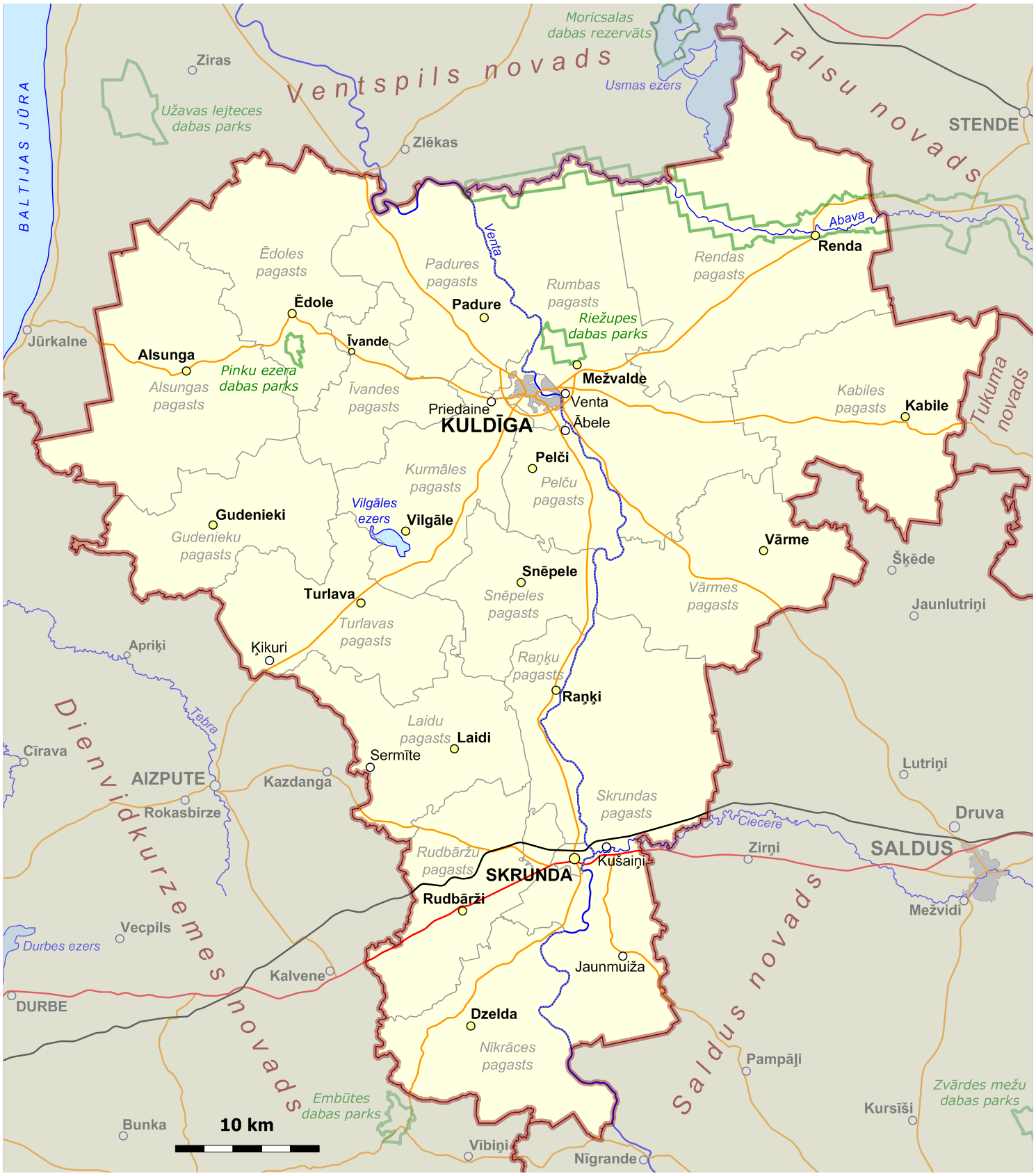
- Country: Latvia
- Formed: 2009
- Reformed: 2021
- Centre: Kuldīga

Government
  - Council Chair: Inese Astaševska (For Kuldīga Municipality)

Area
  - Total: 2,505.17 km^{2} (967.25 sq mi)
  - Land: 2,414.85 km^{2} (932.38 sq mi)

Population (2026)
  - Total: 26,386
  - Density: 10.927/km^{2} (28.300/sq mi)
- Website: kuldigasnovads.lv

Kuldīga Municipality (Latvian: Kuldīgas novads) is a municipality in Courland, Latvia. The municipality was formed in 2009 by merging Ēdole parish, Gudenieki parish, Īvande parish, Kabile parish, Kurmāle parish, Laidi parish, Padure parish, Pelči parish, Renda parish, Rumba parish, Snēpele parish, Turlava parish, Vārme parish and Kuldīga town. The administrative centre is Kuldīga. As of 2020, the population was 22,028.

During the 2021 Latvian administrative reform, the previous municipality was merged with Alsunga Municipality and Skrunda Municipality. The new municipality now fully corresponds with the area of the former Kuldīga district.

== History ==
Kuldīga municipality was established on 1 July 2009. Before that, it was a part of Kuldīga district, which also included Alsunga and Skrunda districts. Kuldīga district was established in 1949. From 1952 to 1953, Kuldīga district was included in Liepāja district.

From 1819 to 1949, most of Kuldīga parish belonged to Kuldīga district. At that time, Ēdole Parish was part of Ventspils district, but Gudenieki Parish, as well as part of Turlava Parish (Klostere Parish) and Laidi Parish (Valtaiķi Parish) were in Aizpute district.

== Twin towns — sister cities ==
Kuldīga is twinned with:

- Drøbak, Norway
- Geesthacht, Germany
- (Georgia (country)) Mtskheta, Georgia

== Notable people ==
- Alexander von Keyserling (1815 at Kabile Manor – 1891), a Baltic German geologist and paleontologist
- Paul Rohrbach (1869 in Raņķi Parish – 1956), a Baltic German writer, concerned with "world politics."
- Mārtiņš Peniķis (1874 in Turlava Parish – 1964), general and commander in chief of Latvian Army from 1928 to 1934.
- Jēkabs Peterss (1886 in Aizpute county – 1938), a Communist revolutionary and politician, helped establish the Soviet Union.
- Līna Čanka (1893 in Renda Parish -1981) a Latvian Corporal, the first woman to be a recipient of the Order of Lāčplēsis, the highest military award of Latvia.
- Leonid Zakovsky (1894 in Aizpute county – 1938), a Latvian Bolshevik revolutionary, Soviet politician and NKVD Commissar
- Heinrich Baron von Behr (1902 at Renda Manor – 1983), a Baltic German general during World War II.
- Eduards Berklavs (1914 in Kurmāle Parish – 2004), Soviet and Latvian politician, elected to the Latvian parliament in 1990 and 1993
- Edgars Račevskis (1936 in Skrunda Parish – 2022), a Latvian conductor.
- Aivars Lazdenieks (1954 in Skrunda – 2023), rower who competed in the 1976 Summer Olympics

== See also ==
- Administrative divisions of Latvia
