= Īvande Parish =

Parish of Latvia

- parish of Latvia
- Coat of arms

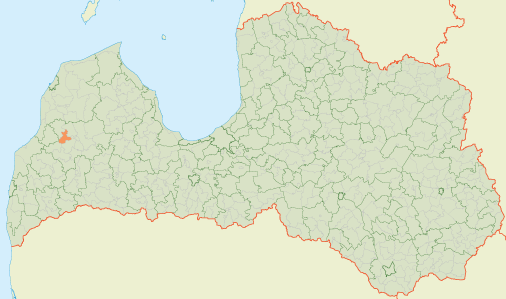
- 56°58′12″N 21°47′02″E
- Country: Latvia

Area
  - Total: 71.60 km^{2} (27.64 sq mi)
  - Land: 70.22 km^{2} (27.11 sq mi)
  - Water: 1.38 km^{2} (0.53 sq mi)

Population (1 January 2024)
  - Total: 329
  - Density: 4.6/km^{2} (12/sq mi)

Īvande Parish (Latvian: Īvandes pagasts) is an administrative unit of Kuldīga Municipality in the Courland region of Latvia. The parish had a population of 399 on July 1, 2010 and covers an area of 71.11 km^{2}.

== Villages of Īvande parish ==
- Apuze
- Īvande
- Mazīvande

== See also ==
- Īvande Manor
