= Curonian Kings =

Latvian cultural group

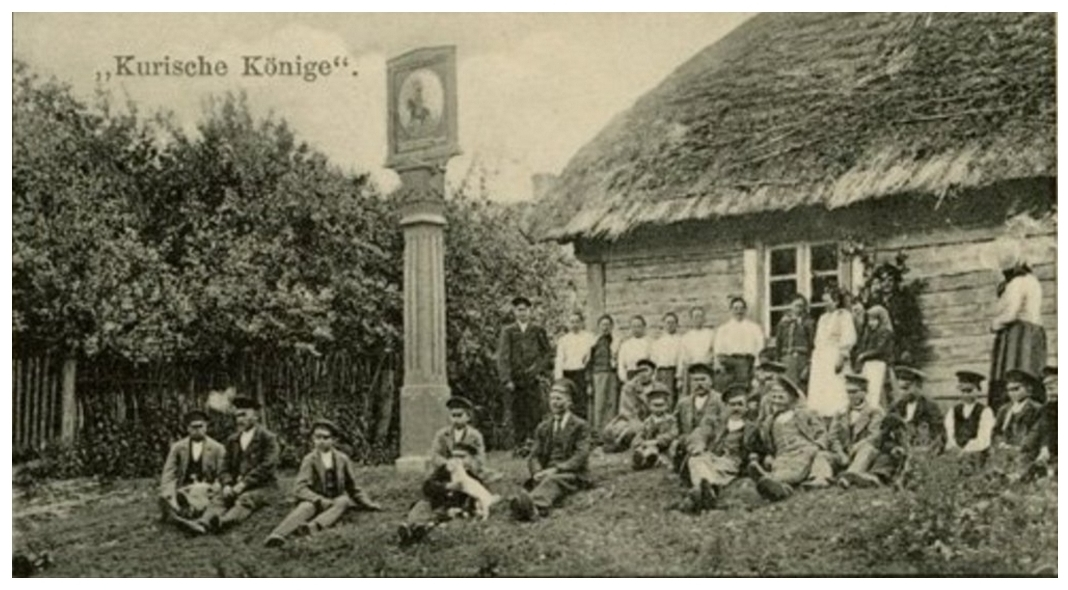
Postcard from early 20th century showing Curonian Kings with their coat of arms column

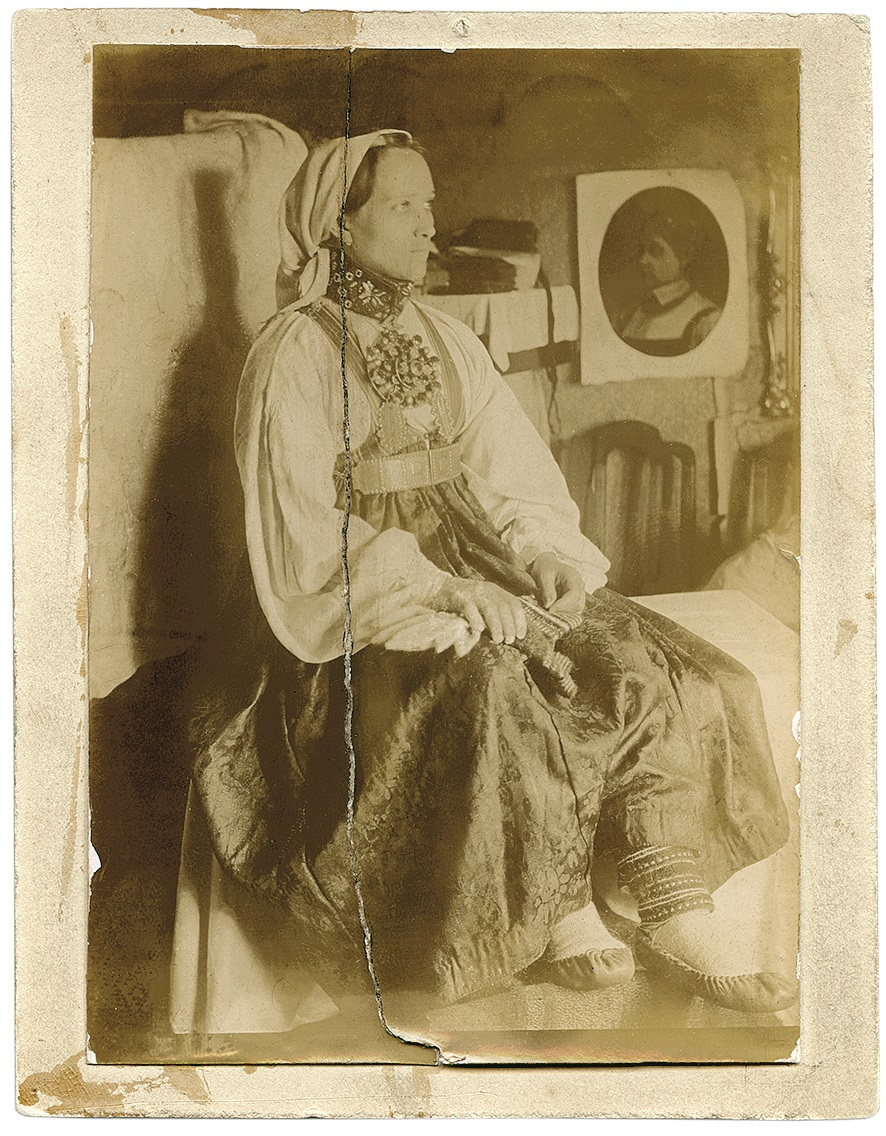
Curonian king woman from Turlava parish in Kuldīga region wearing traditional clothing (1895)

Curonian Kings (Middle Low German: Cursken konyngh; German: Kurische Könige; Russian: курляндские короли; Latvian: kuršu ķoniņi) were a Latvian social and cultural group of free peasants and farmers. They served as lesser vassals and lived in seven villages between Goldingen (Kuldīga) and Hasenpoth (Aizpute) in Courland.

== Ethymology ==
The term "kings" is an etymological misnomer derived from the Middle Low German "Cursken konyngh"; despite their title, the Curonian Kings were not actual reigning monarchs or nobility, but rather a class of free landholder peasants. The name likely originated from the exceptional privileges granted to them by the Livonian Order.

== History ==
The ancestors of the Curonian Kings were Curonians who accepted baptism in the 13th century and supported the Livonian Order in campaigns against local tribes. In return for their military service and loyalty, the Order granted them hereditary lands within the newly formed state, which were exempt from most taxes and labor duties. Under this arrangement, they subordinate to the ruling German crusaders. They were first mentioned in a document of 1320 and lived in the villages of Ķoniņciems, Pliķu ciems, Kalējciems, Ziemeļciems, Viesalgciems, Sausgaļciems, and Dragūnciems (now in Kuldīga municipality). All of them possessed independent farms (did not belong to any lord), but they were not allowed to own their own serfs. They had only one landlord komtur of Kuldīga and they were related to him only by military service in case of war. Curonians usually served as a light cavalry in the Livonian Order army. Sources mention that Curonian Kings fought in the Livonian War against invading Russians, as Johann Renner's chronicle reports:

The Russians protected themselves boldly, and they knocked out a Curonian flag bearer (who, although only a peasant, is called by them the Curonian king) from his horse.

— Johann Renner, Lievländische Historien, 1556–1561, C. 124v

In 1504, master of the Livonian order Walter von Plettenberg awarded Curonian King Andrejs Peniķis, commander of the Curonian light cavalry for his loyal service during Livonian wars with Tsardom of Russia.

It is known that in the 17th century Curonian Kings had their own coats of arms. In the Duchy of Courland and Semigallia they gradually lost their privileges, but they were still counted as a separate class. They were not recognized landlords but maintained a middle position between landlords and peasants. However, in the 18th century they were likened to serfs, although with smaller socage duties.

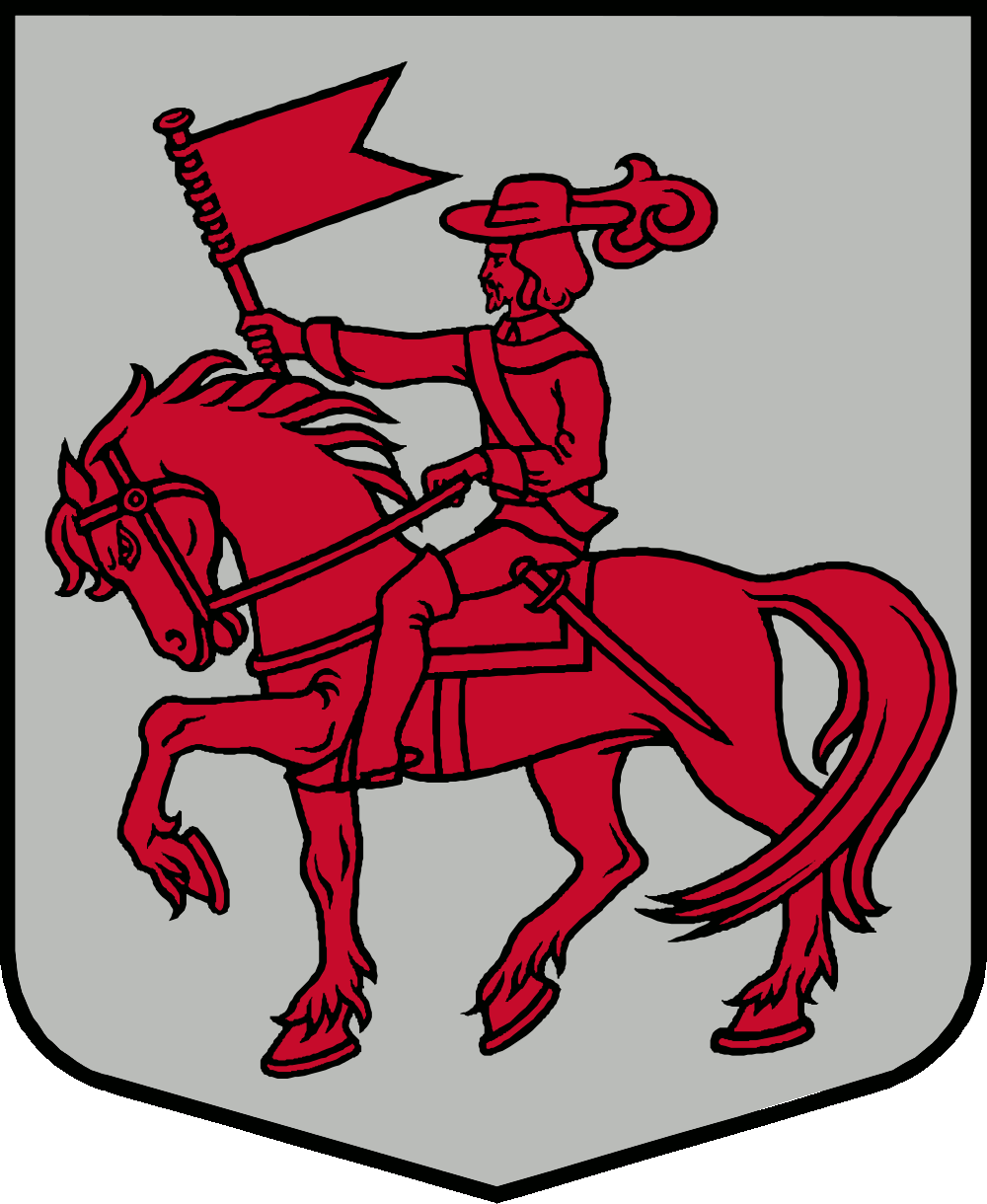
Coat of arms of Turlava parish based on the 17th. century coat of arms of Curonian Kings

Following the incorporation of Courland into the Russian Empire in 1795, by the Russian Senate they were classified as personally free rural freeholders. The Code of Laws of the Russian Empire secured their right to hereditary ownership of land as property, own coat of arms, and the right to free hunting. Compact settlements were autonomous from the courts of the local Germans barons. Their status resembled that of the odnodvortsy in the Russian Empire.

According to the 1863 ethnographic registers of the Russian Empire, the population of the Curonian Kings was officially recorded at 405 individuals. While the Curonian tribe had long been assimilated by the Latvians, the Curonian Kings preserved a separate identity and traditions. Ultimately, the newly established Republic of Latvia (1918–1940) abolished all feudal class distinctions and stripped the Curonian Kings of their exceptional privileges through the Latvian Land Reform of 1920. This sweeping legislation dismantled the only historical native landowners of the Latvian people, ending their centuries-old communal autonomy and separate judicial status. Their historically held fiefdoms were broken up and integrated into the standard national land distribution system, bringing an end to their unique socio-legal and cultural status. In 1929, the Saeima passed a law to divide the free villages of Kuldīga County into single farmsteads, which completed the process.

== Traditions ==
Unlike the vast majority of Latvians who were subjected of feudal serfdom and landlessness under German landlords, the Curonian Kings remained personally free and practiced endogamy by marrying exclusively within their own several clans to preserve their unique status.

The Curonian Kings also were allowed to practice some aspects of paganism during the period of Livonian Confederation. Despite formal Christianisation after Livonian Crusade Curonian Kings owned a sacred forest where nobody was allowed to hunt or walk. It is possible that the first mention in written sources of those sacred forests occurs in the record left by the Flemish knight Guillebert de Lannoy in 1414. In 1413–1414, he travelled through Livonia to Novgorod republic, and has left a short description of a Curonian funeral in his travel notes:

The aforementioned Curonians, although they have been made Christian by force, have a sect that, instead of burying their dead, burns them in a nearby grove or forest, dressed and adorned with the finest ornaments, constructing a pyre entirely from oak wood; and they consider that if the smoke rises straight up to the heavens, then the soul is saved, but if it is blown to the side, then the soul is lost.

— Guillebert de Lannoy (1414)

Their Christmas traditions were described in a 16th century travel description by Königsberg apothecary Reinhold Lubenau:

I first reached Mummel and then passed through Courland, reaching the Curonian king, where we had to watch his pagan superstitions. Since Christmas was approaching, they went hunting in their holy forest, where they do no hunting and do not cut a single rod throughout the rest of the year. All that they now hunted there: roe deer, red deer and hares, they skinned, cooked and placed on a long table. They fastened a large number of wax candles to the table, for the souls of their parents, children and relatives. After this, standing and walking to and fro, they ate and drank, and forced us to do likewise. Later, they brought an empty beer keg and beat on it with two sticks, and the men and women, as well as the children, danced around the table, something that continued for the whole night. When they went to bed one after another, they invited us to eat and take with us what we would, since they would not eat what was left over, but would give it to the dogs. Neither did they want to take any payment from us for what we had eaten.

— Reinhold Lubenau (20 December 1585)

== Notable Curonian Kings ==
- Mārtiņš Peniķis (1874–1964) – Latvian general, commander in chief of Latvian Army from 1928 to 1934.
- Ivars Tontegode (1983) – Latvian film director.
- Jānis Peniķis (1933) – Latvian political scientist.
