= Vārme Parish =

Parish of Latvia

- parish of Latvia
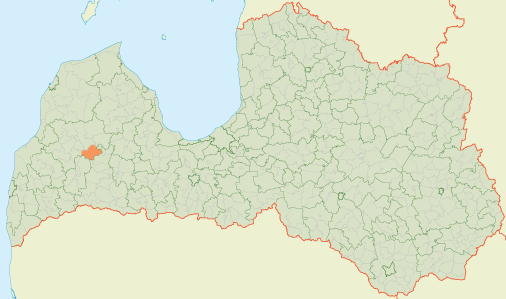
- 56°51′24″N 22°11′23″E
- Country: Latvia

Area
  - Total: 147.17 km^{2} (56.82 sq mi)
  - Land: 144.65 km^{2} (55.85 sq mi)
  - Water: 2.52 km^{2} (0.97 sq mi)

Population (1 January 2024)
  - Total: 886
  - Density: 6.0/km^{2} (16/sq mi)

Vārme Parish (Latvian: Vārmes pagasts) is an administrative unit of Kuldīga Municipality in the Courland region of Latvia. The parish has a population of 1114 (as of 1/07/2010) and covers an area of 147.33 km^{2}.

== Villages of Vārme parish ==
- Dūras
- Vārme
- Vecvārme
- Zalkšciems

== See also ==
- Vārme Manor
