= Turlava Parish =

Parish of Latvia

- parish of Latvia
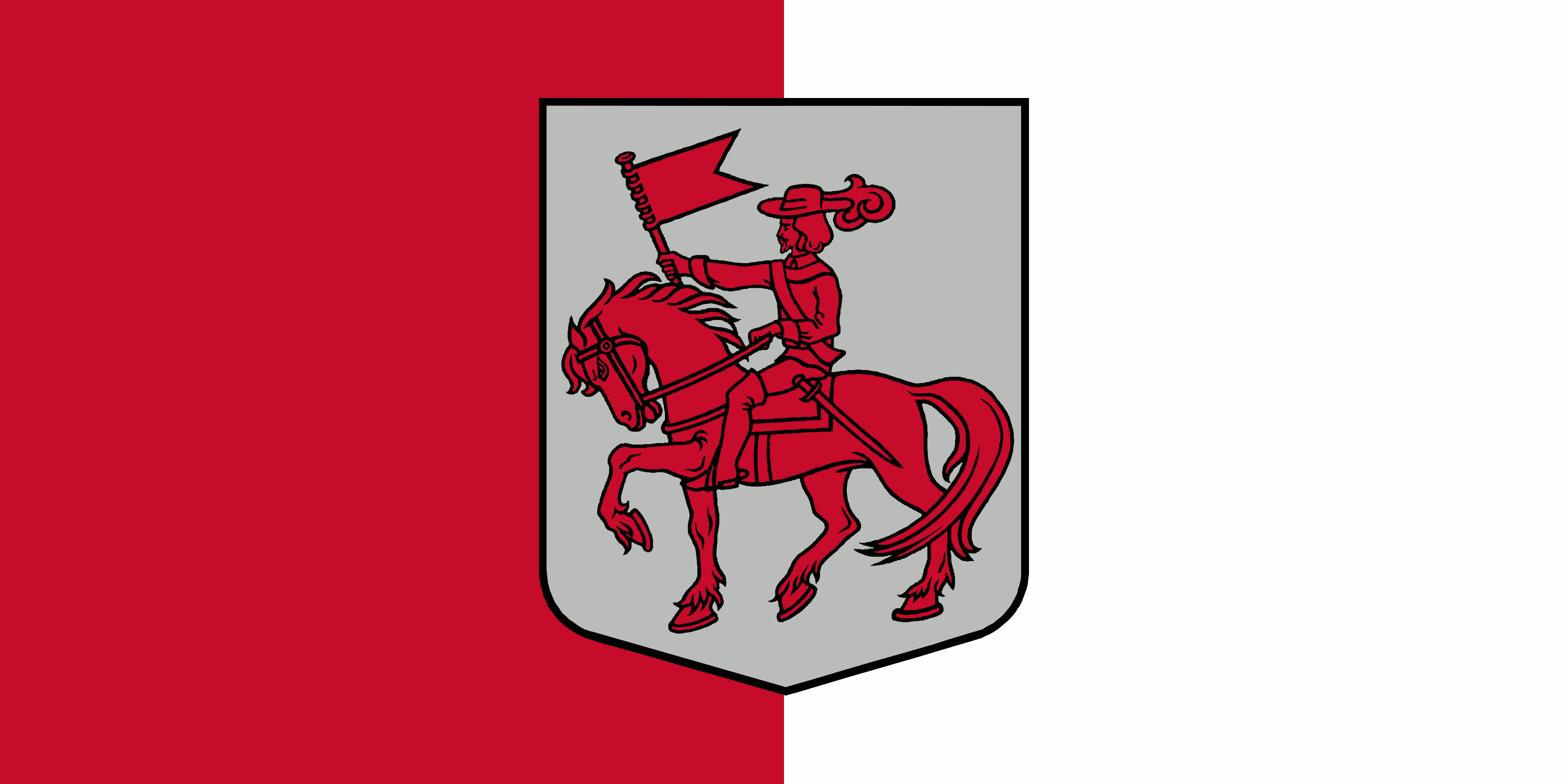
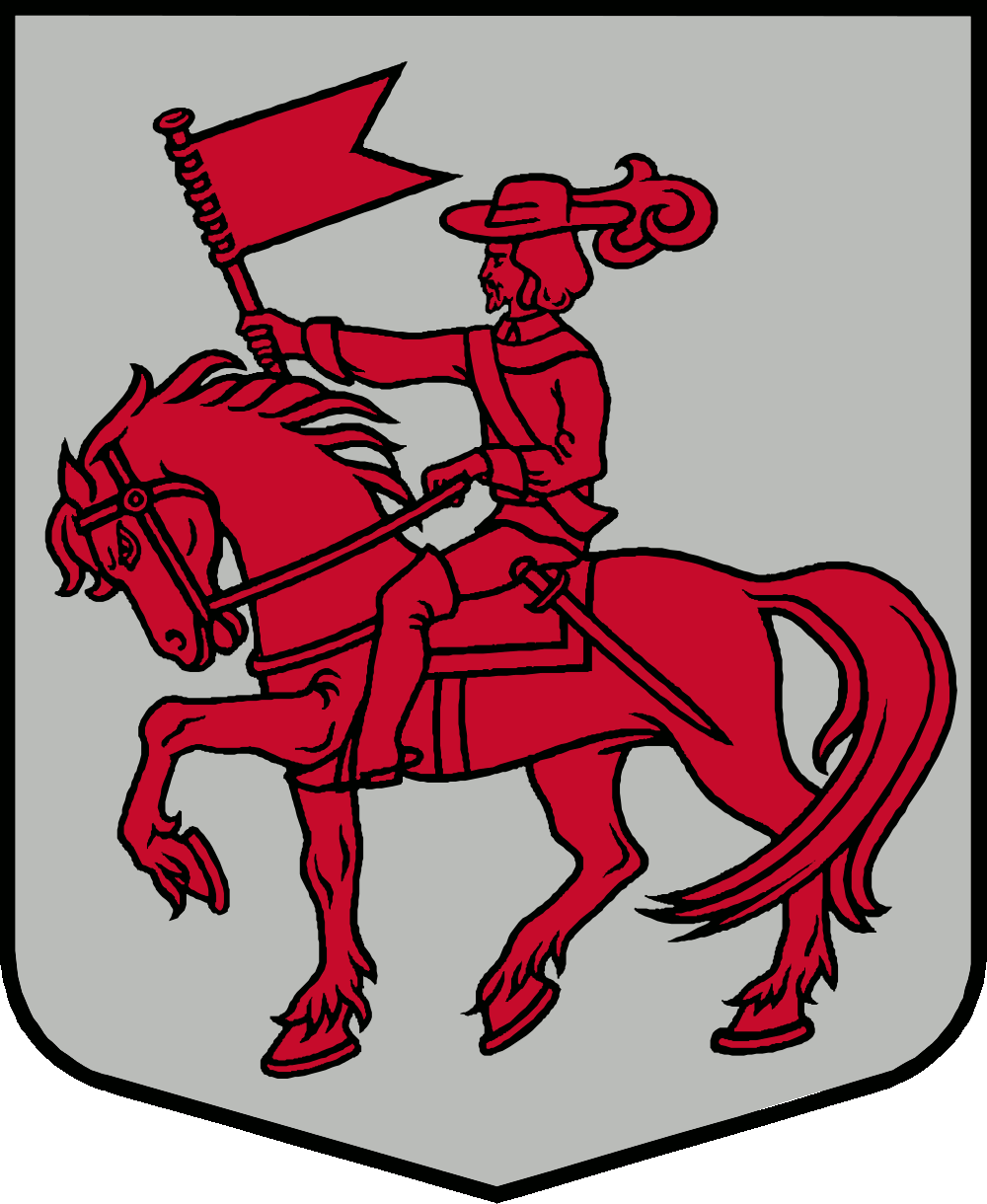
- Flag Coat of arms

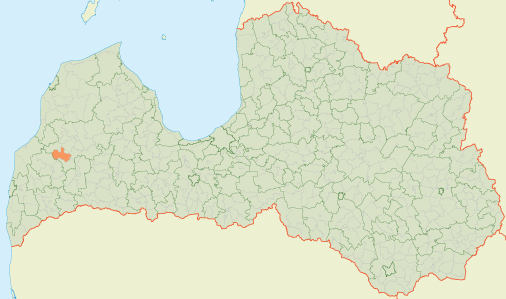
- 56°49′41″N 21°44′35″E

- Location within Latvia
- Country: Latvia

Area
  - Total: 124.53 km^{2} (48.08 sq mi)
  - Land: 121.14 km^{2} (46.77 sq mi)
  - Water: 3.39 km^{2} (1.31 sq mi)

Population (1 January 2026)
  - Total: 770
  - Density: 6.4/km^{2} (16/sq mi)

Turlava Parish (Latvian: Turlavas pagasts) is an administrative unit of Kuldīga Municipality in the Courland region of Latvia. It has a population of 775 as of 2024 and covers an area of 124.51 km^{2}. Turlava serves as the parish seat (administrative center).

== Villages of Turlava Parish ==
- Grantiņi
- Jāmaiķi
- Kalējciems
- Kazlēnciems
- Klostere
- Krievciems
- Ķikuri
- Ķoniņciems
- Maras
- Turlava
- Valāti
- Ziemeļciems

== See also ==
- Curonian Kings (the symbol of which is featured in the parish coat of arms)
