= Ventspils district =

District of Latvia

Coordinates: 57°25′N 21°32′E

Ventspils
- District
- Coat of arms

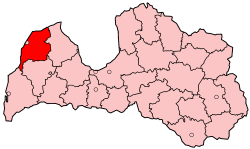
- Country: Latvia

Area
  - Total: 2,462 km^{2} (951 sq mi)

Population (1998)
  - Total: 14,530
  - Density: 5.902/km^{2} (15.29/sq mi)
- Website: ventspilsrp.lv/

The Ventspils district (Latvian: Ventspils rajons), was an administrative division of Latvia, located in the Courland region, in the country's west.

The district consisted of eleven parishes and one rural territory. The city of Ventspils was district-free, and not part of the population estimate. All districts were eliminated during the administrative-territorial reform in 2009.

== Parishes and rural territory ==
- Ance
- Jūrkalne
- Pope
- Puze
- Targale
- Ugale
- Usma
- Uzava
- Varve
- Ziras
- Zlekas
- Piltene town's rural territory.
