= Labrags =

- Village
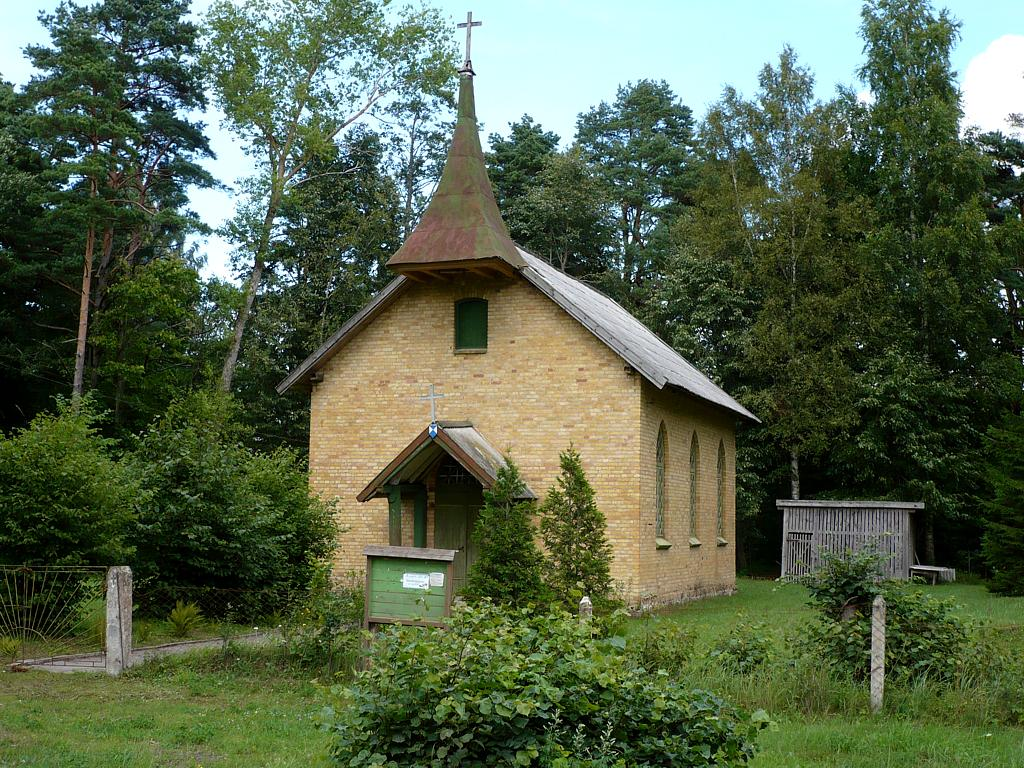
- Labrags Lutheran Church

- Location within Latvia
- Coordinates: 56°58′53″N 21°21′37″E
- Country: Latvia
- Municipality: Ventspils novads
- Parish: Jūrkalne

Area
  - Total: 218 km^{2} (84 sq mi)

Population (2021)
  - Total: 88
  - Density: 0.40/km^{2} (1.0/sq mi)
- Postal code: LV-3626

Labrags is a village in Jūrkalne Parish, Ventspils region, Latvia. It is located in the southwest of the parish, 5 km from the parish center Jūrkalne, 53.7 km from the county center Ventspils, and 196.5 km from Riga. The settlement is located at the intersection of the P111 (Ventspils (Leči) —Grobina) and V1186 (Labrags–Rīva–Sarkanvalks) roads, on the banks of the Rīva River. The settlement developed around the Labraggen and Felixberg manor centers. Part of the historic village in the southwest is part of the Ulmale village of Saka parish . A nature trail "Rīvas loki" leading along the Rīva River begins near Labrags.

== Population ==
Within the existing boundaries, according to CSB and OSP data.

Population changes
Year	Pop.	±%
2000	43	—
2011	36	−16.3%
2021	40	+11.1%
