= Cēsu Alus =

Brewery based in Latvia

- Industry: Beer and beverages
- Founded: 1995 (roots 1590)
- Headquarters: Aldaru laukums 1, Cēsis, Latvia, Cēsis, Latvia
- Key people: Eva Sietiņsone
- Products: Beer, cider, kvass, energy drink, non-alcoholic beverages
- Revenue: 91,234,131 euro (2022)
- Net income: 2,883,247 euro (2022)
- Total assets: 45,341,578 euro (2022)
- Number of employees: 261 (2022)
- Parent: Olvi (Finland)
- Website: cesualus.lv

Cēsu Alus is a brewery and alcohol beverage producer in Cēsis, Latvia. As the roots of the brewery dates back in 1590, Cēsu Alus is considered to be the oldest brewery in Baltic and Nordic countries. Cēsu alus is the largest brewery producing beer in Latvia. In year 2018 Cēsu alus produced 64% of all beer produced in Latvia.

== History ==
In 1590 brewing of beer is referred for the first time in the Cēsis Castle audit. The first brewery was located in the castle itself. In the first half of 17th century the brewery was relocated to the third forecastle. In 1878 the historic brewery buildings were built and the brewery was established in the ownership of count Emanuel von Sievers.

In 1922 several entrepreneurs from Cēsis repurchased the brewery from Sievers and established the joint-stock company Augļu dārzs (English: Fruit Garden).

In 1940 SC Augļu dārzs was nationalised. In 1976 Industrial beer producer Cēsu Alus was established which also incorporated breweries in Naukšēni and Gulbene.

In 1995 Cēsu Alus was privatised and once again became a joint stock company. In 1999 Cēsu Alus was bought by the Finnish beer and non-alcoholic drinks producer Olvi. In July 2001 the new brewery plant was opened in Cēsis with a filling capacity of 20 million litres of beer. In 2003 Cēsu Alus became the second largest beer producer in Latvia, and in year 2014 - Cēsu alus became the largest brewery producing beer in Latvia.

JSC Cēsu alus participates in the evaluation of the Sustainability Index since its introduction in Latvia in 2010. In the first three years, JSC Cēsu alus received a Silver rating, but with a purposeful development of the company's operations and sustainability performance, from 2013 onwards, the company's performance in the Sustainability Index was awarded with a Gold level certificate, and from 2017 with the highest – Platinum level.

== See also ==
- Bauskas alus
- Užavas Alus
