= Užava Lighthouse =

Lighthouse in Latvia

Užava Lighthouse Užavas bāka
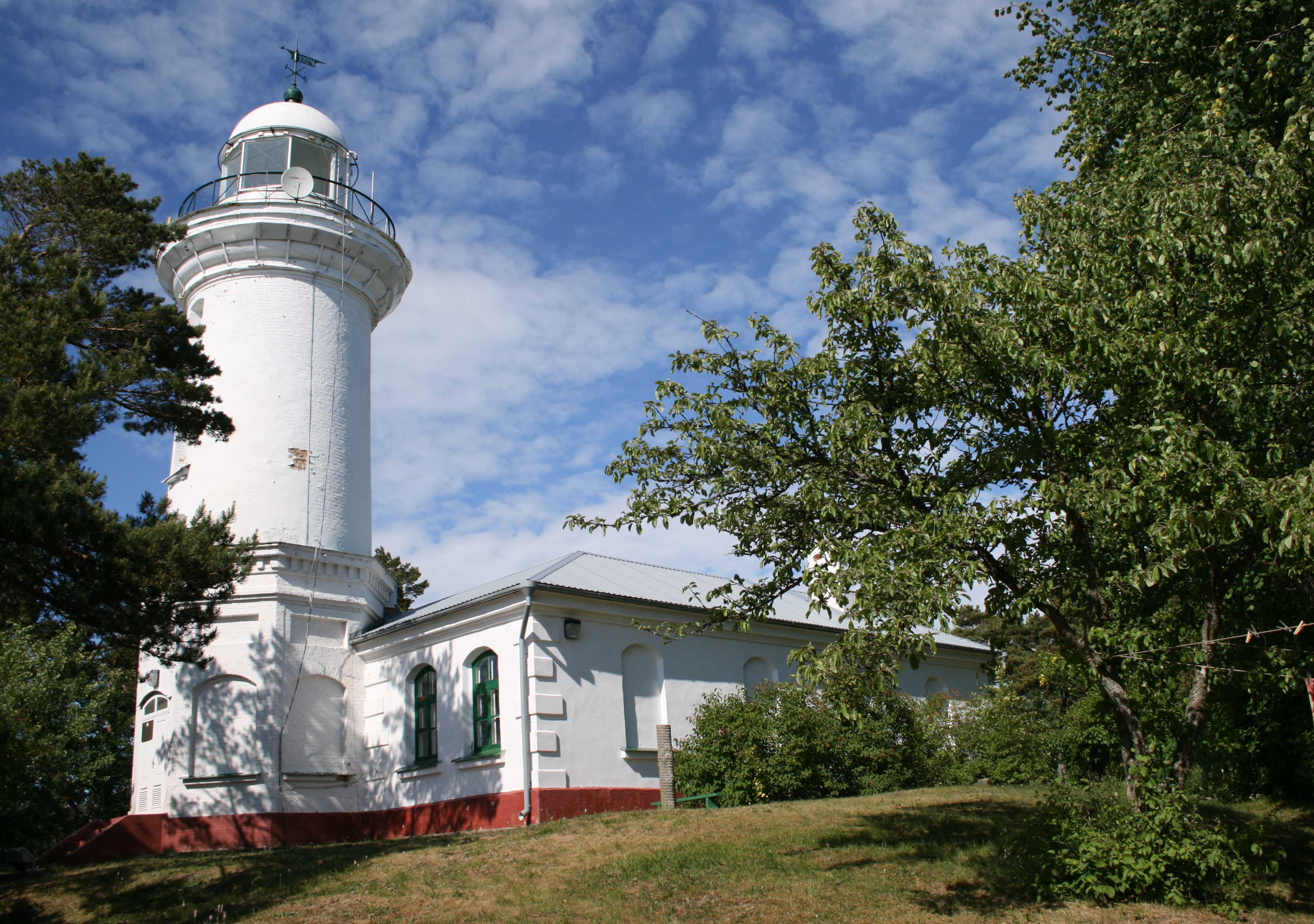
- Užava Lighthouse
- Location: Užava; Ventspils district Latvia
- Coordinates: 57°12′32.5″N 21°24′52.8″E

Tower
- Constructed: 1879 (first)
- Foundation: octagonal basement
- Construction: limestone tower
- Height: 19 metres (62 ft)
- Shape: cylindrical tower with balcony and lantern
- Markings: white tower and lantern
- Heritage: National industrial monument

Light
- First lit: 1925 (current)
- Focal height: 44 metres (144 ft)
- Range: 15 nautical miles (28 km; 17 mi)
- Characteristic: white light, 1.5 s on, 2.5 s off, 1.5 s on, 4.5 s off
- Latvia no.: UZ-650

Užava Lighthouse (Latvian: Užavas bāka) - a lighthouse located on the Latvian coast of the Baltic Sea. The lighthouse stands in an isolated location, on a 28 metres high sand dune, which is permanently threatened by the Baltic Sea waves' erosion. For this reason, the first coastal reinforcement – a dense log wall was constructed to secure the lighthouse's location in 1910. Later, fir-tree baskets filled with gravel, and big boulders to absorb the waves' energy. Currently, the base of the lighthouse is protected by rock armour.

== History ==
The original tower of the Užava lighthouse was destroyed by artillery shells during World War I. The present-day lighthouse tower is 19 metres in height, completed in 1925. The inscription of the year 1924 on the nearby weather vane on the lightower's dome roof marks the beginning of construction works of the lighthouse.

== See also ==
- List of lighthouses in Latvia
