= Užava =

River in Latvia

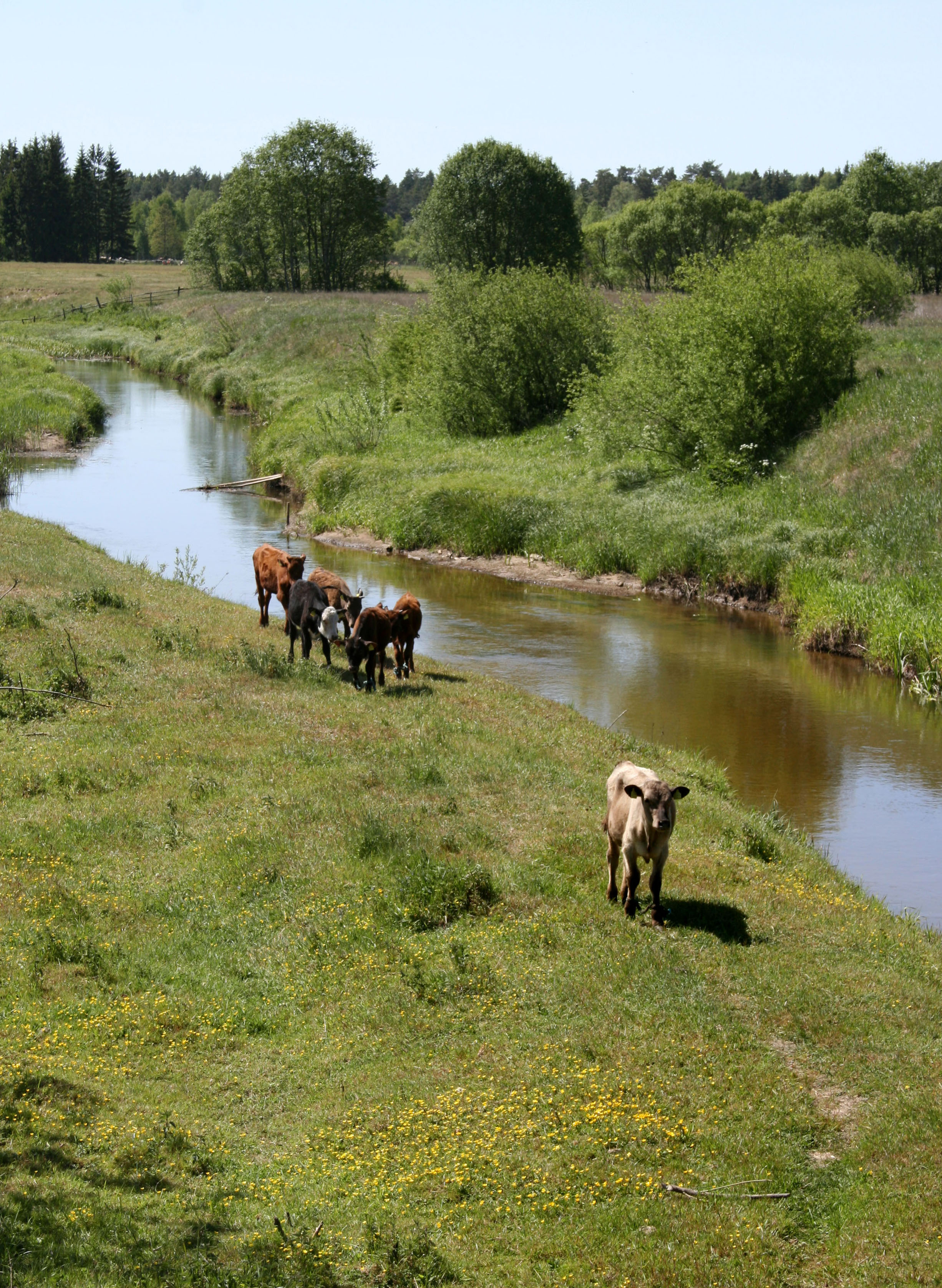
- Užava

- Location within Latvia

Location
- Country: Latvia

Physical characteristics
- Source
  - location: Gudenieki Parish, Latvia
  - coordinates: 56°52′44″N 21°39′43″E
  - elevation: 46 m (151 ft)
- Mouth
  - location: Baltic Sea
  - coordinates: 57°14′49″N 21°24′47″E
- Length: 67 kilometres (42 mi)
- Basin size: 601 km^{2} (232 sq mi)
- Discharge
  - average: 0.17 m^{3}/s (6.0 cu ft/s)

Užava (also Dižupe, Zirgmežupe; upstream known as Mazkaiba river, Mālupe; middle stream name Bumbuļupe) is a river in Latvia in Kuldīgas, Alsungas and Ventspils counties. It empties into the Baltic Sea.

== Geography ==
Užava begins between Gudenieki and Basu manor in Gudenieki Parish. It flows along the Piemare and Ventava plains in a north-eastern direction. Most of the flow, except for the section between Tērande and Sise, is regulated and river bed is straightened. As a result of land development and drainage, polder was built along the river. River discharges into the Baltic sea below the village of Užava.

== Tributaries ==
Left bank tributaries

- Saltvalks,
- Bērzkalnupe,
- Tiemene.

Right bank tributaries

- Guļas valks (7 km),
- Stirna (10 km),
- Mārgava (6 km),
- Kauliņas River (26 km),
- Vanka (30 km),
- Gaiļvalks,
- Tērande (15 km).

== See also ==
- Užava lowland
