= Pope Palace =

Palace in Latvia

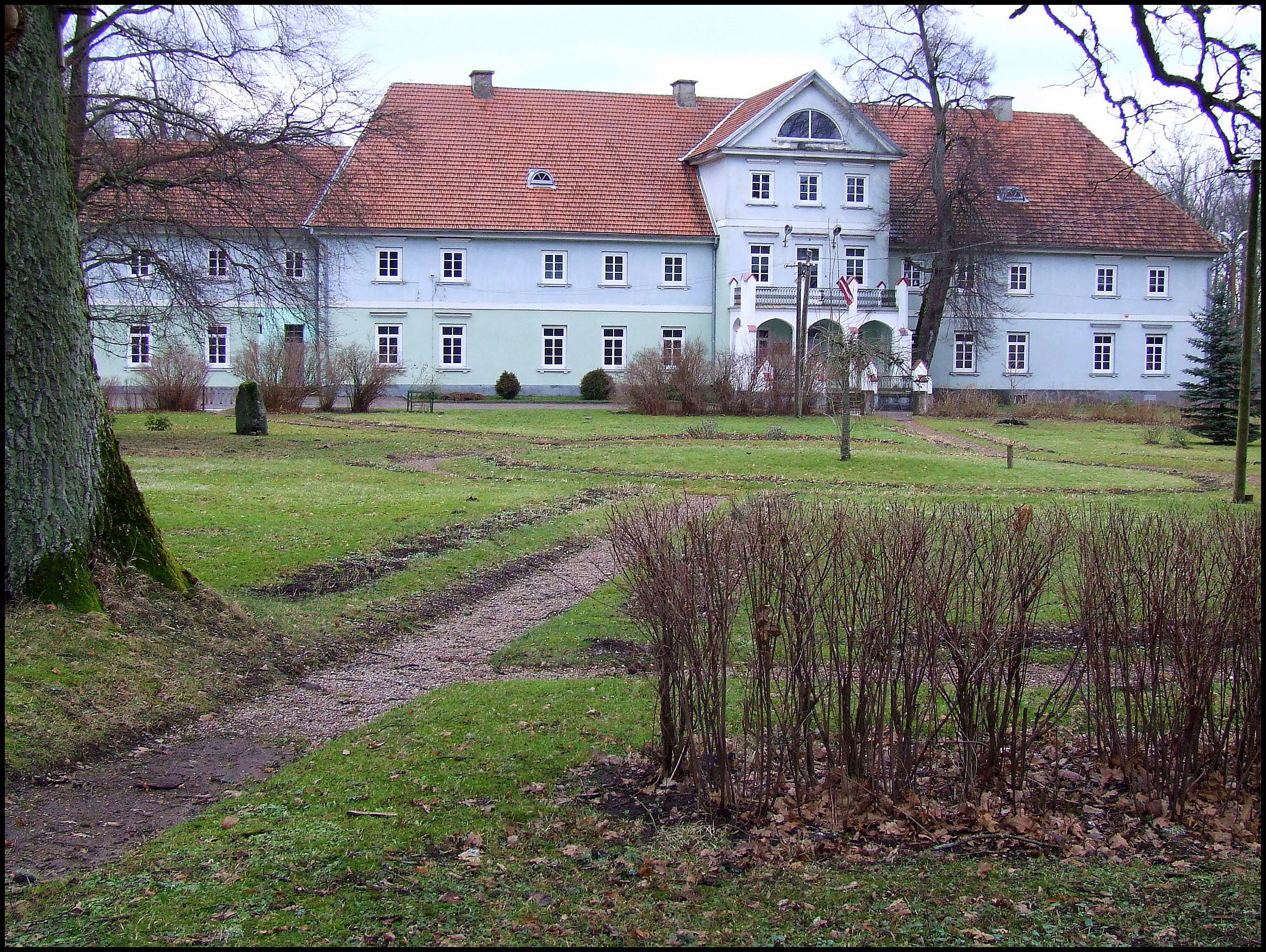

- Location within Latvia

General information
- Location: Pope Parish, Ventspils Municipality, Courland, Latvia
- Coordinates: 57°24′19″N 21°51′25″E
- Construction started: 1653
- Completed: 1840
- Client: von Behr

Pope Palace (Latvian: Popes muižas pils) is a palace in Pope parish, an administrative unit of the Ventspils municipality in the historical region of Courland, in western Latvia. It was originally built in 1653 for the von Behr family, but was extensively remodeled in 1720 and 1840. Since 1920 the building has housed the Pope primary school.

== See also ==
- List of palaces and manor houses in Latvia
