= Užava, Latvia =

Village in Latvia

Užava
- Village
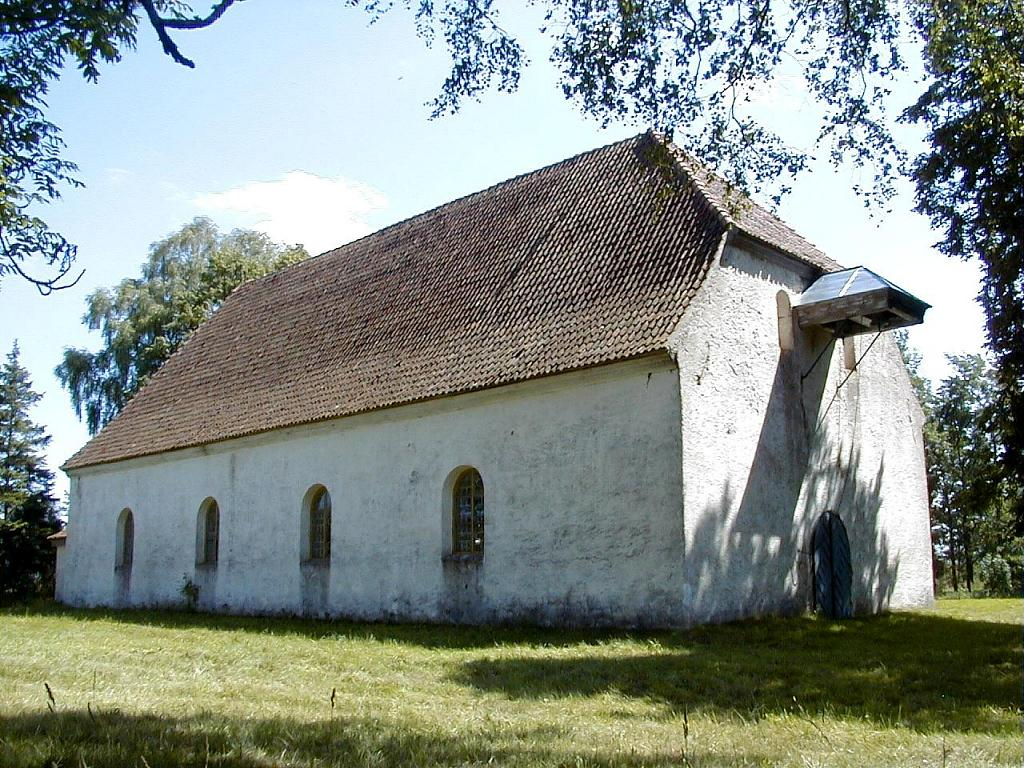
- Užava Lutheran Church

- Location in Latvia
- Coordinates: 57°13′49″N 21°27′27″E
- Country: Latvia
- Municipality: Ventspils
- Parish: Užava
- Elevation: 5 m (16 ft)

Population (2019)
  - Total: 298
- Time zone: UTC+2 (EET)
  - Summer (DST): UTC+3 (EEST)
- Postal code: LV-3627

Užava (German: Hasau) is a village in Ventspils Municipality, in the Courland region of Latvia. It is the center of Užava Parish. Village is located on the bank of the Užava river by the highway P111 23 km from the municipal center Ventspils and 210 km from Riga. There is an elementary school, a house of culture and a library. Užavas Alus brewery is located 3 km from the village on highway P111 in direction toward Liepāja.

== History ==
The settlement is located near the center of the former Užava manor (German: Hasau) and the Lutheran church. In the Russian Empire village belonged to the Windau district, Courland Governorate. The Evangelical Lutheran Church was built in 1783 and renovated in 1892. A Baptist parish was founded in 1861 and a church was built in 1888. This church establishment marks the beginning of the Baptist movement in Latvia. It became a larger settlement in the post World War Two years, when Užava was the center of Soviet farm Užava. When Latvia was part of Soviet Union the division of surface-to-air missile system S-125 Neva/Pechora was located in the village.

== See also ==
- Užava Lighthouse
- Užava lowland
