= Bauskas alus =

Company based in Latvia

- Industry: Light alcoholic and non-alcoholic beverages
- Founded: 1981
- Headquarters: Īslīce parish, Bauska municipality, Latvia
- Products: Beer, kvass

Bauskas alus is a brewery in Bauska, Latvia.

It was established in 1981, at the time as a part of a local kolkhoz canning factory. At first the brewery produced traditional beers such as Marta alus (Märzen), Rīgas alus (Beer of Riga) and Senču alus (Ancestors' Beer). In 1982 the brewery started producing their main articles Bauskas gaišais (Bauska Light) and Bauskas tumšais (Bauska Dark).

2017 was a productive year. The brewery launched two products - beer "Savējais" and beer cocktail "Festiņš", which consists of light beer and "tea mushroom drink Dr.Kombucha". In that year, the plant had a turnover of €5.226 million, up 4.2% on the previous year, while profits rose by 29.2% to €635,635.

In 2018, a new type of production, "Dr.Kombucha Karkade", a tea mushroom drink with a red tea flavour, was launched. The company's turnover reached EUR 7.4m and its profit EUR 1.3m.

In June 2019, it was announced that Bauskas alus would be sold to Cido Grupa. Following approval by the Competition Council, the transaction was completed on 4 November with Cido Grupa's Lāčplēša alus Ltd becoming the owner.

== See also ==
- Užavas Alus
