= Užava lowland =

Protected landscape area in Ventspils Municipality, Latvia

- Latvian: Užavas lejtece
- IUCN category II (national park)
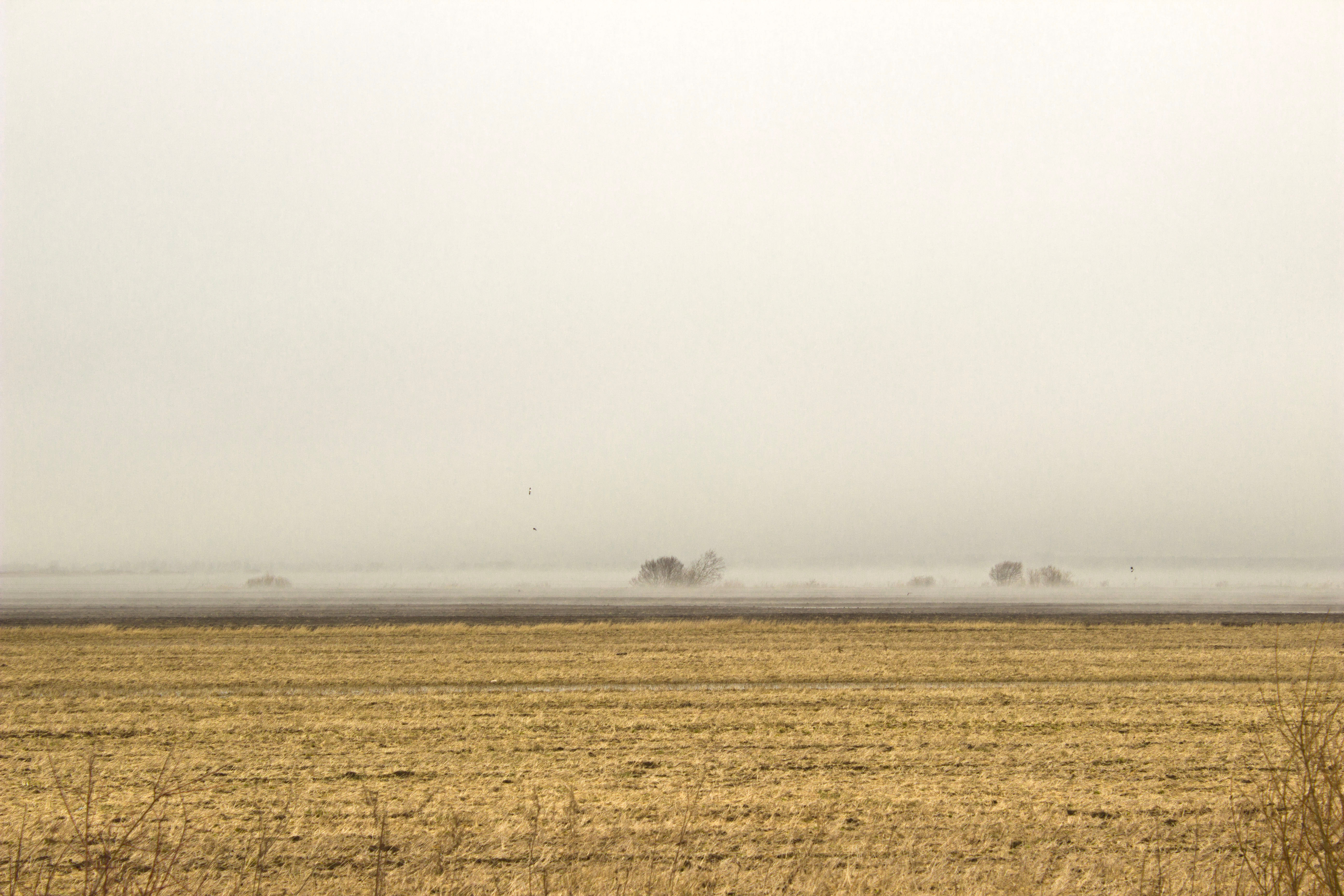
- Foggy day in Užavas polder.

- Location within Latvia
- Location: Latvia, Courland, Ventspils Municipality
- Nearest city: Ventspils
- Coordinates: 57°09′22″N 21°29′59″E
- Area: 14.34 km^{2} (5.54 sq mi)
- Established: 2004

Užava Lowland is nature park in Ventspils Municipality, Latvia. It is located in the Užava river floodplain in Užava and Ziras parishes. It occupies a large part of the currently dysfunctional Užava polder. Natura 2000 site.

== Important bird habitat ==
The nature park was established in 2004 and has been recognised as an Important Bird Area (IBA) by BirdLife International because it supports populations of whooper swan (Cygnus cygnus), taiga bean goose (Anser fabalis), corncrake (Crex crex) during their migration and nesting. Birds, mainly waterfowl (geese, swans, ducks, gulls), congregate here during spring migration to rest in flooded fields and meadows. During the autumn migration, the concentration of birds in the territory of the nature park was not observed. The most important nesting bird species in the park are northern lapwing, corn crake, common quail, lesser spotted eagle, Montagu's harrier, etc.

== See also ==
- Bird migration
