= Volfas Engelman =

Lithuanian brewery

Coordinates: 54°53′09″N 23°55′38″E

SP Volfas Engelman

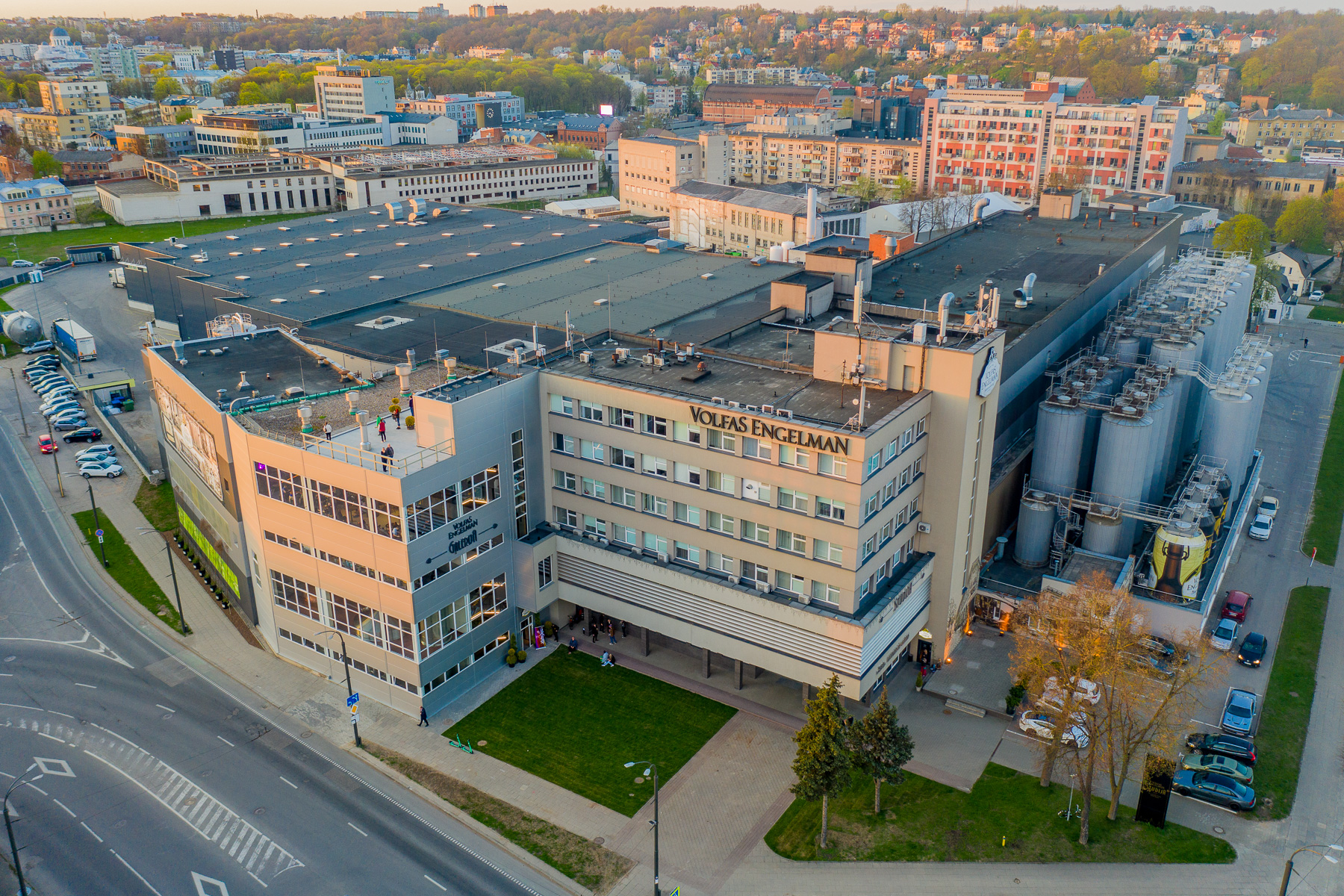
- Volfas Engelman Brewery in 2023
- Type: Joint-stock company
- Industry: Light alcoholic and non-alcoholic beverages
- Founded: 1853
- Founder: Ferdinand Engelman; Rafailas Volfas
- Headquarters: Kaunas, Kaunakiemio 2
- Key people: CEO Marius Horbačauskas
- Products: Beer, cider, cocktails, kvass, energy drinks
- Revenue: €80.610 million (2022)
- Number of employees: 289
- Parent: Olvi
- Website: volfasengelman.lt

Volfas Engelman is a manufacturer of alcoholic beverages in Kaunas, Lithuania.

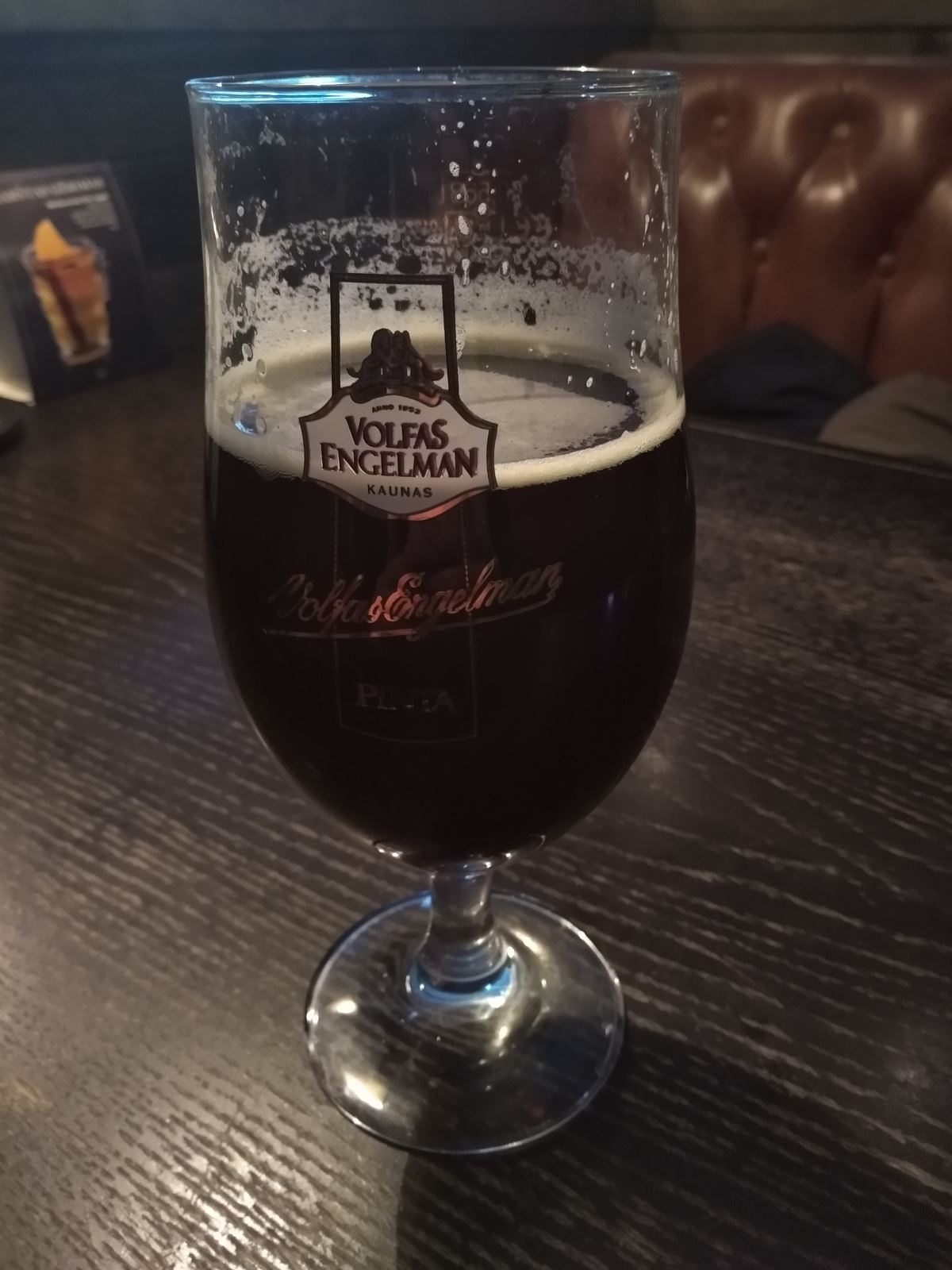
A pint of dark Volfas Engelman

The Volfas Engelman brewery was established in the 19th century. Today the brewery produces beer, cider, alcoholic mixed drinks, kvass and energy drinks. Volfas Engelman brewery is named after its two founders. Since 2012, the CEO of the company is Marius Horbačauskas. It has more than 230 employees, making Volfas Engelman the second-largest brewery in Lithuania. As of 2023, 99.57 percent of Volfas Engelman shares belong to the Finnish Olvi company group. In 1994, the brewery Ragutis underwent privatization and reorganization, becoming a joint-stock company. In 1997, 51 percent of Ragutis shares were acquired by the Pilsner Urquell Group. Later that year, Pilsner Urquell transferred a controlling stake to the Estonian company A. Le Coq, which is operated by Olvi. I. On April 12, 2011, the brewery reverted to its historical name, Volfas Engelman.

== Brands ==
=== Beer ===
- "Volfas Engelman"
- "1410"
- "Horn"
- "Fortas"

=== Cider ===
- "Fizz"
- "Sherwood"

=== Alcohol cocktails ===
- "LE COQ"
- "G:N"

=== Kvass ===
- "SMETONIŠKA GIRA"
- "VOLFAS ENGELMAN IMPERIAL GIRA"

=== Energy drinks ===
- "DYNAMI:T"
- "BCAA VITAMINERAL PERFORMANCE"

=== Soft drinks ===
- "VOLFAS ENGELMAN FASSBRAUSE"
- "KANE'S"
- "AURA"
- "SAKMĖ"

== Works cited ==
- Vilma Akmenytė, Giedrė Milerytė. Nuo I.B.Volfo ir Engelmano iki Ragučio. - K.:Kopa, 2008. — 208 p.: iliustr. — ISBN 978-9955-772-06-4
