= A. Le Coq =

Estonian brewery

- Type: Subsidiary
- Industry: Food production
- Founded: London, United Kingdom (1807)
- Founder: Albert J. L. Le Coq
- Headquarters: Tartu, Estonia
- Area served: Estonia
- Products: Beer, cider, mineral water, juice, Long Drinks, Soft Drinks
- Parent: Olvi
- Website: www.alecoq.ee

A. Le Coq (Estonian pronunciation: [ˈɑ.le ˈkokˑ]) is an Estonian brewery. The company was founded in 1807 by a Prussian family of the same name, who were descendants of the Huguenots who had fled France in the 17th century. The company was bought in 1997 and is currently owned by the Finnish company Olvi. It produces many types of drinks including beers, long drinks, ciders and soft drinks. The best known beer is the A. Le Coq Premium, which is the most popular beer in Estonia, according to the latest AC Nielsen results in October 2008. A. Le Coq Arena in Tallinn was named after the beer.

A. Le Coq's key brands are A. Le Coq (beer), Fizz (cider), Aura (juice), Dynami:t (energy drink), Arctic (sport drinks) and Limonaad (softdrink).

Its motto is Asi on maitses, meaning 'it's about the taste'. A song with this name by the rock band Smilers was also specifically written for and is used in commercials.

== History ==
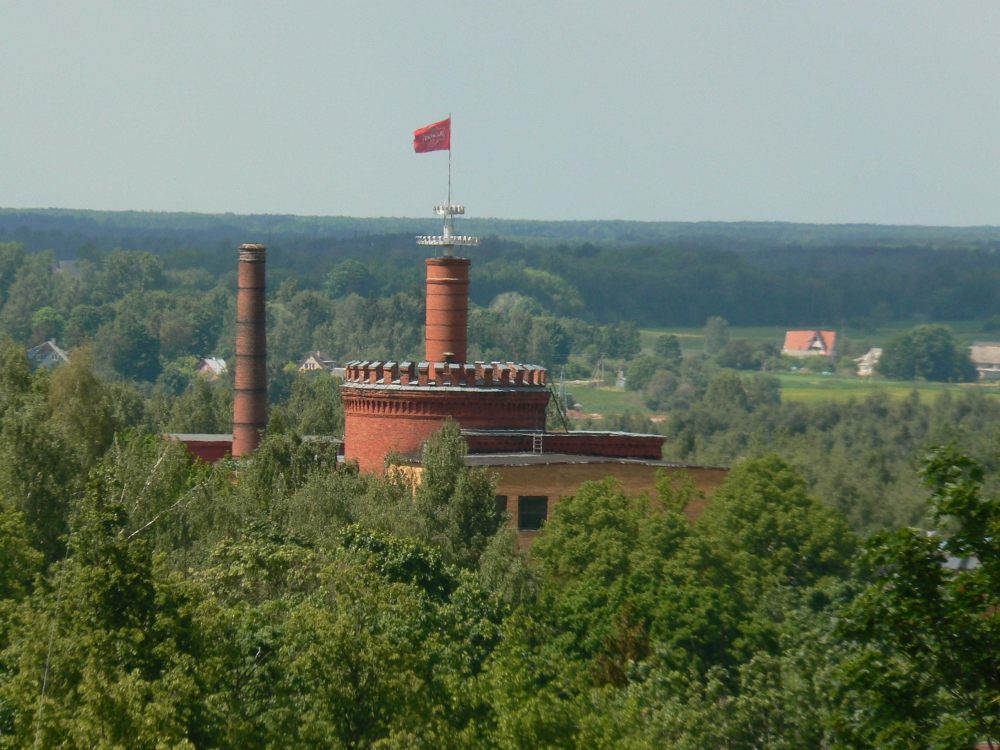
A. Le Coq brewery in Tartu

Direct predecessors of the oldest Estonian brewery that has been continuously operating – A. Le Coq – in Tartu are the breweries of B. J. Hesse (1800) and J. R. Schramm (1826). In course of time, a large enterprise Tivoli Ltd. formed from these companies, the owner of which called it in 1913 A. Le Coq Ltd.

Company A. Le Coq & Co. dealing with beverage trade was established in Prussia in 1807 by a family bearing the same name. In the 1820s, Albert J. L. Le Coq settled in London to trade with the products of the family's wine manor. He soon started to bottle and export under his name Russian Imperial stout. He ordered that special dark and strong top-fermented beer from the big breweries in London where the drink was bottled, especially taking into consideration the taste preferences of Russian market.

High customs duties levied in Russia and increasingly more frequent forging of the reputable trademark forced A. Le Coq & Co. (Russia) Ltd. that had been transformed into a private limited group in 1904 to move its headquarters and bottling plant from London to St. Petersburg. The owners of A. Le Coq were looking for many years for a suitable brewery to manufacture Imperial stout in Russia, in the end Tivoli Ltd. in Tartu proved to be chosen, where the company is operating today.

Over the last 200 years, A. Le Coq has passed through the hands of many owners and many managers, but the trademark itself endures. During the Soviet era the company's name was changed to Tartu Õlletehas ('Tartu Brewery'), but it became A. Le Coq once again in 1997, when it was privatised by Olvi. Since then, the A. Le Coq brand has been reintroduced and significant investments have made the company (and its trademark) one of the leading and most recognised brands in Estonia.

In 2025 A. Le Coq signed a deal to acquire Estonian mineral water producer Värska Originaal.

== Products and markets ==
A. Le Coq is Estonia's oldest brewery and currently the country's biggest beverage producer. Its range incorporates ten product categories: waters, syrups, juices, juice drinks, soft drinks, energy drinks and sports drinks; and three light alcoholic drinks: beers, ciders and gin long drinks.

The company's largest product group comprises its beers, which are principally manufactured under the A. Le Coq trademark. The Aura trademark represents non-alcoholic drinks, including juices, waters and healthy juice drinks, which are marketed in Aura Active. One of the best known international trademarks in the company's portfolio is Fizz, representing a series of natural fruit and berry-flavored ciders. The two most popular soft drinks in the company's product portfolio are the traditional Limonaad and Kelluke, which have been sold for decades. The company exports its products mainly to Finland, Sweden, Denmark, the United Kingdom, Latvia and Lithuania. Their main export sources are beers, ciders, long drinks and juices. In 2018, Le Coq entered the Hong Kong market with its ready-to-drink cocktail line. As of 2026, Le Coq premixed alcoholic and non-alcoholic cocktails are available in over 80 countries worldwide.

== Fermented kvass controversy ==
In early 2009, A. Le Coq announced plans to start producing fermented kvass. The plans were controversial due to the drink's ethanol content (estimated at 0.5–0.7 percent by volume); most bottled kvass sold in Estonia is manufactured from unfermented malt or malt extract and does not contain ethanol. The issue of safety of fermented kvass for children was particularly contentious.

In June 2009, A. Le Coq announced it would start selling the fermented kvass in an unbottled form.

== Kelluke ==
Kelluke ("Little bell", originally named after a Campanula) is a clear lemon-flavoured non-alcoholic soft drink produced since 1965 by A. Le Coq (formerly and colloquially known as Tartu Õlletehas (Tartu Brewery)) in Estonia. After a temporary name change since 2001, Kelluke made its comeback in 2006. Since 2010 Kelluke has been produced without preservatives. It has been compared to Sprite, but the original makers of the drink were not familiar with Sprite before the recipe for Kelluke was finished.

== See also ==
- Beer in Estonia
