= Piltene Parish =

Parish of Latvia

- parish of Latvia
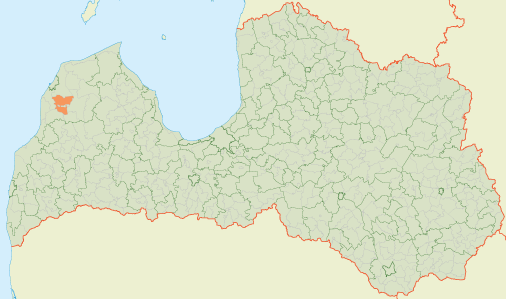
- Coordinates: 57°14′53″N 21°44′20″E
- Country: Latvia

Area
  - Total: 196.55 km^{2} (75.89 sq mi)
  - Land: 188.18 km^{2} (72.66 sq mi)
  - Water: 8.37 km^{2} (3.23 sq mi) 4.26%

Population (1 January 2026)
  - Total: 436
- Time zone: Eastern European Time
- Postal code: LV-3620

Piltene Parish (Latvian: Piltenes pagasts) is an administrative unit of Ventspils Municipality in the Courland region of Latvia. The parish has a population of 559 (as of 1/07/2010) and covers an area of 187.856 km^{2}.

== Villages of Piltene Parish ==
- Bestes
- Branči
- Dziļgu
- Gārzde
- Jaunzemji
- Karaļciems
- Lagzdiena
- Landze
- Ūdrande
- Vecmuižciems
- Zūru
