= Olvi =

Finnish brewery and soft drinks company founded 1878

Olvi plc
- Native name: Olvi Oyj
- Type: Julkinen osakeyhtiö
- Traded as: Nasdaq Helsinki: OLVAS
- Industry: Consumer products
- Founded: 1878; 148 years ago
- Headquarters: Iisalmi, Finland
- Key people: Patric Lundell, CEO (2023–); Lasse Aho, CEO (2004–2022)
- Revenue: ▲583.7 million € (2022)
- Operating income: 59.8 million € (2022)
- Net income: 44.9 million € (2022)
- Number of employees: 2,335 (2022)
- Website: www.olvi.fi/en/

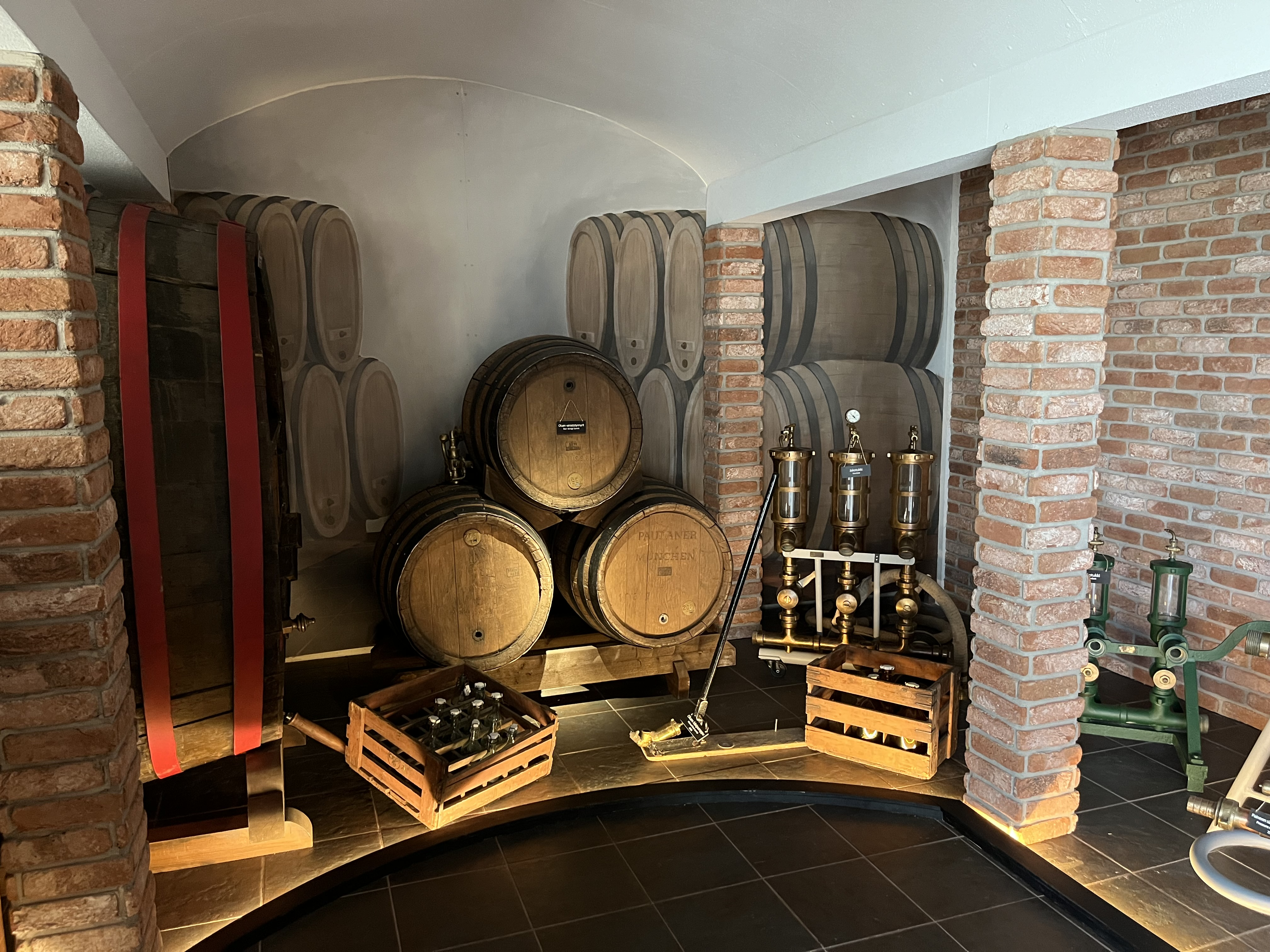
Olvi Foundation Brewery Museum in Iisalmi

Olvi plc (Finnish: Olvi Oyj, Nasdaq Helsinki: OLVAS) is a Finnish brewery and soft drinks company founded in 1878 by the brewer Williams Gideon Åberg and his wife Onni. It currently holds 18.7% of Finland's market share in beverages, making it the third-largest producer of beer, cider and soft drinks in Finland and the largest Finnish-owned business in its sector. Among its subsidiaries, A. Le Coq is the second largest beverage company in Estonia and Volfas Engelman is the third largest beverage company in Lithuania. Olvi also has businesses in Latvia (Cēsu Alus) and Belarus (Lidskаe Pivа). In May 2021, Olvi bought a controlling stake in Denmark's fourth largest brewery A/S Bryggeriet Vestfyen. After the Russian invasion of Ukraine on March 5, 2022, Olvi announced that it was ceasing exports to Russia and leaving Belarus.

In December 2025, it was announced that Olvi would acquire a majority share in the Brewery International Group, strengthening its presence in Sweden and Norway. The transaction expands Olvi's operations into beverage importing and distribution across grocery retail, on-trade, and state-controlled monopoly markets in the two countries.

== Beers ==
- Olvi (Ykkönen, III, Export, Tuplapukki, HALKO)
- Sandels (III, IV A, Tumma, Special Edition)
- A. Le Coq (Premium, Porter, Gold, Pils, Alexander)
- Cēsu alus
- Banjalucka Pivara
- Volfas Engelman
- Starobrno (license)
- Warsteiner (license)
- Pirkka III-OLUT

== Ciders ==
- Fizz (Original Dry, Extra dry)
- Sherwood Premium Cider

== Long drinks ==
- Olvi-lonkerot (granberry, mojito, kultalonkero)
- GIN Long Drink

== Hard seltzers ==
- Hard Seltzer Juiced Raspberry
- Hard Seltzer Mango-Pineapple
- Hard Seltzer Strawberry-Rhubarb
- Hard Seltzer Lemon and Lime

== Soft drinks ==
- Kane's Soda Pop (Chula Vista Crush, Pasadena Pinch...)
- Olvi soft drinks (Jaffa, cola, lemon...)
- Muteman Premium Ginger Ale (ginger flavored soft drink, sold in the MENA region via Nordic General Trading L.L.C)
- TEHO (energy drink)
- Motor oil (energy drink, sold in the UAE via Nordic General Trading L.L.C)
- KevytOlo (Mineral waters: Lähdevesi, Raikas, Karpalo, Mansikka-Sitruuna, Mustaherukka, Päärynä, Sitruuna, Vihreä Omena, Vadelma+Kalsium, Sitruuna mehukivennäisvesi, Makea Ananas, Makea Kuningatar)

== Natural Mineral Water ==
- Arctic Silence (Natural Mineral Water, sold in the MENA region via Nordic General Trading L.L.C)

== Olvi products ==
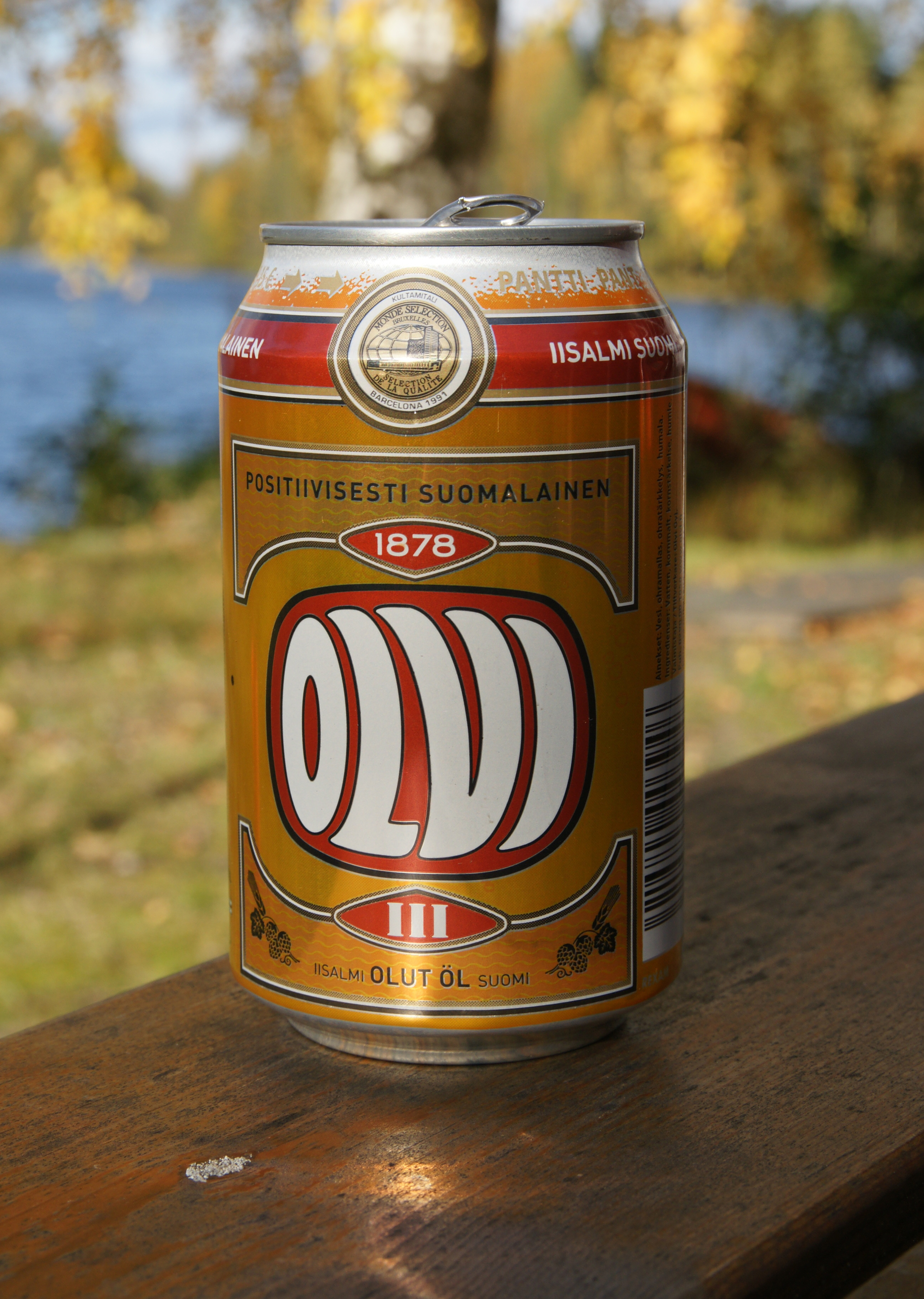
Olvi III

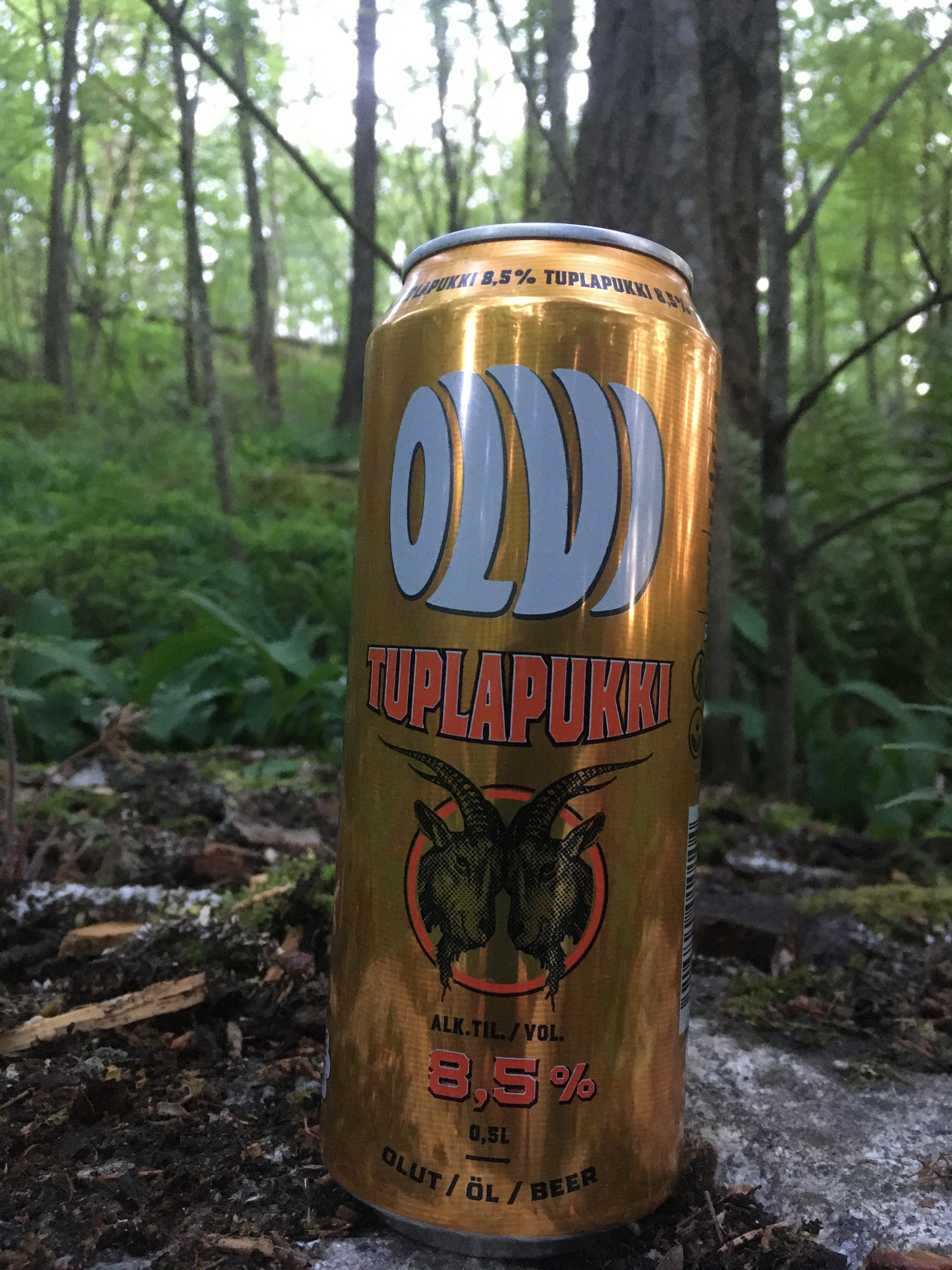
Olvi Tuplapukki

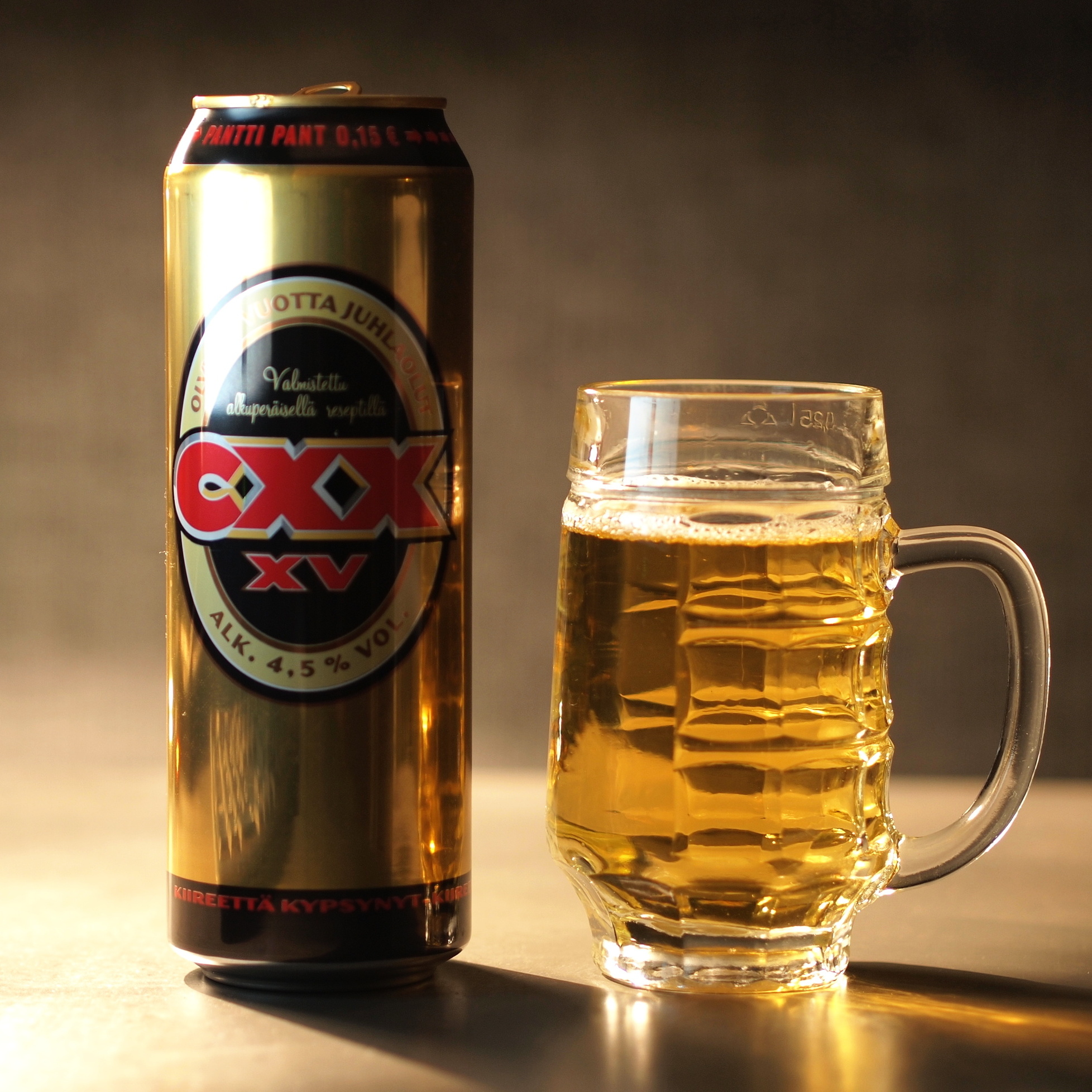
Olvi CXX XV

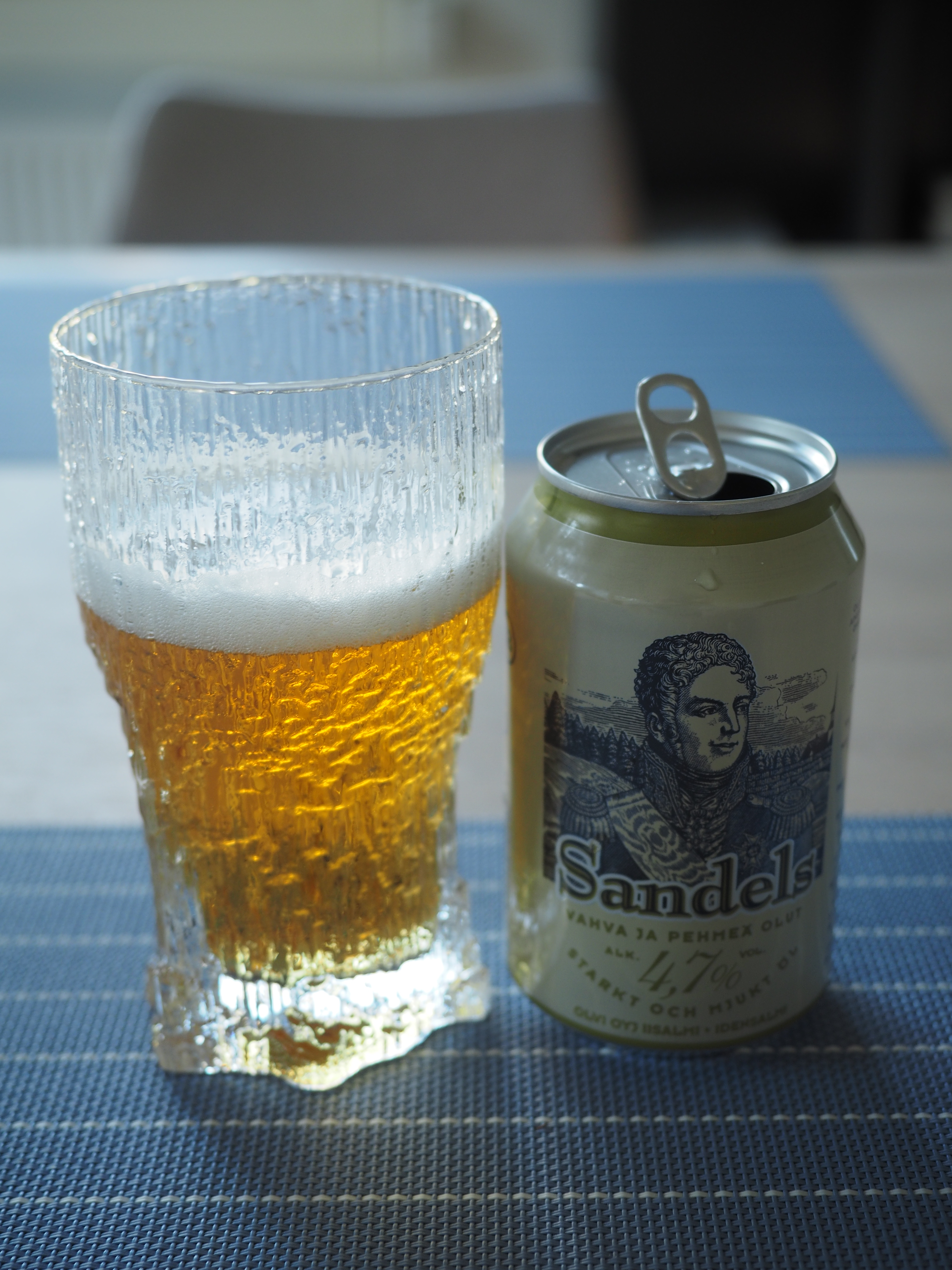
Sandels beer

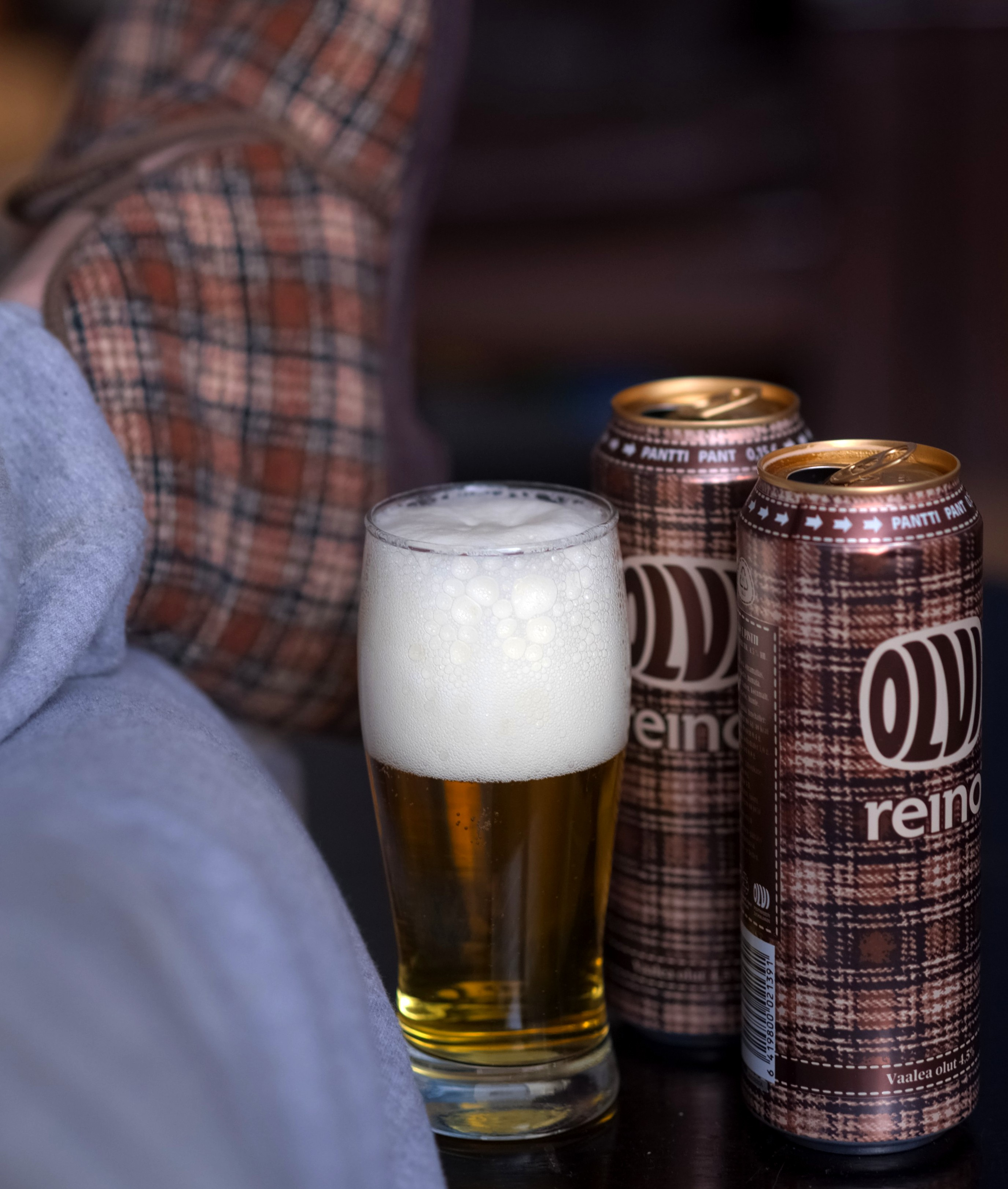
Olvi Reino

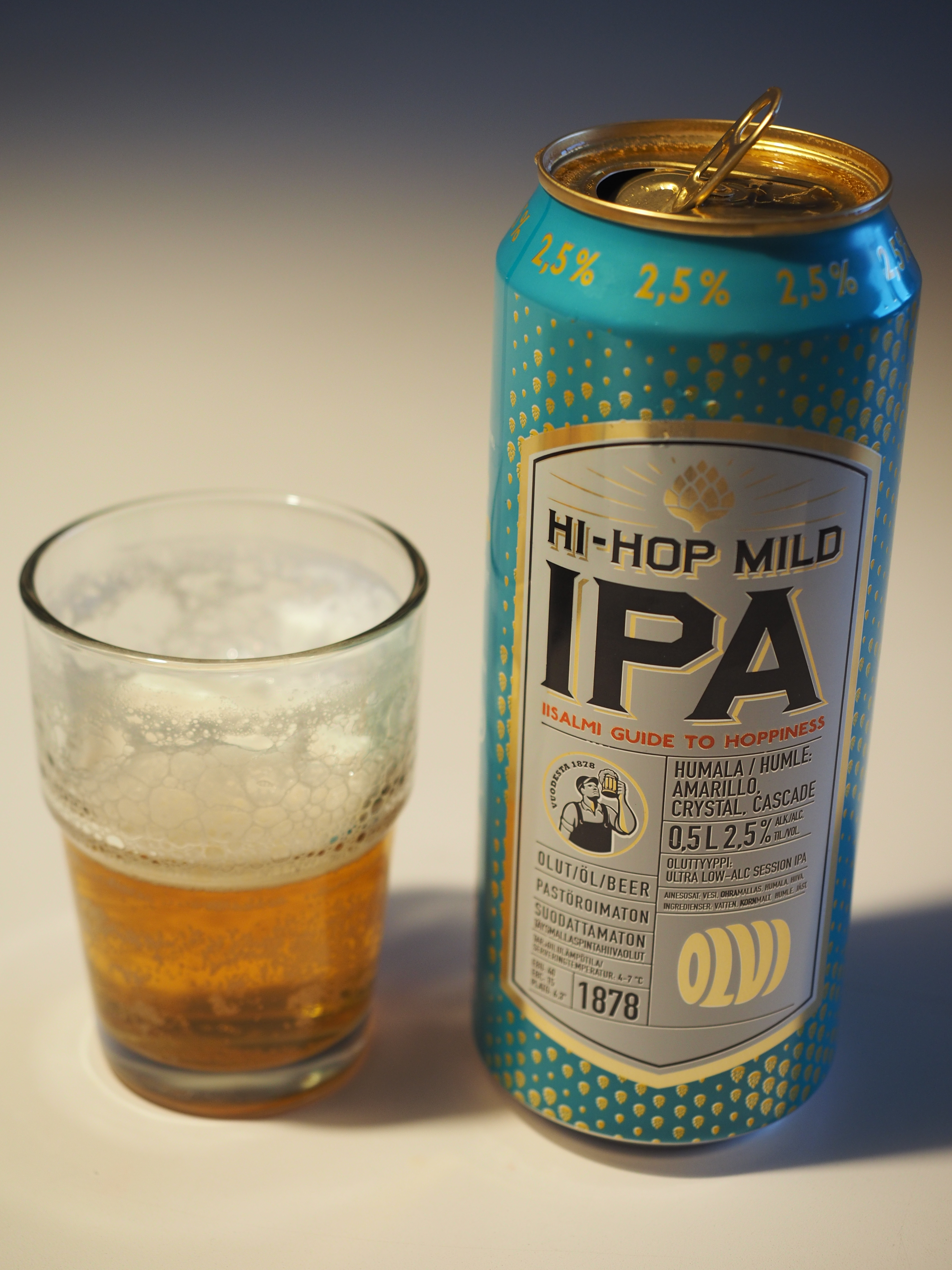
Hi-Hop Mild IPA

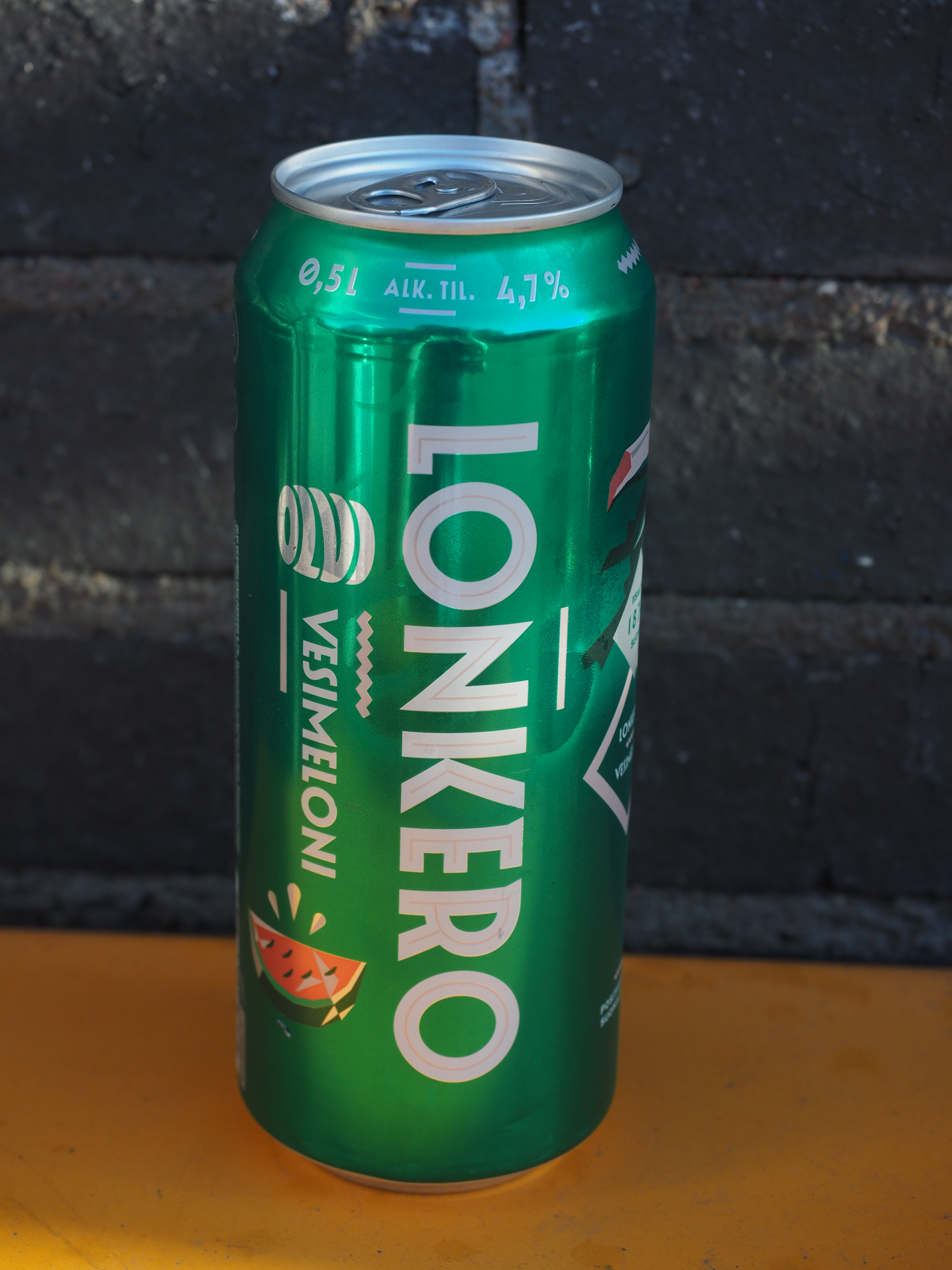
Olvi watermelon-flavoured long drink

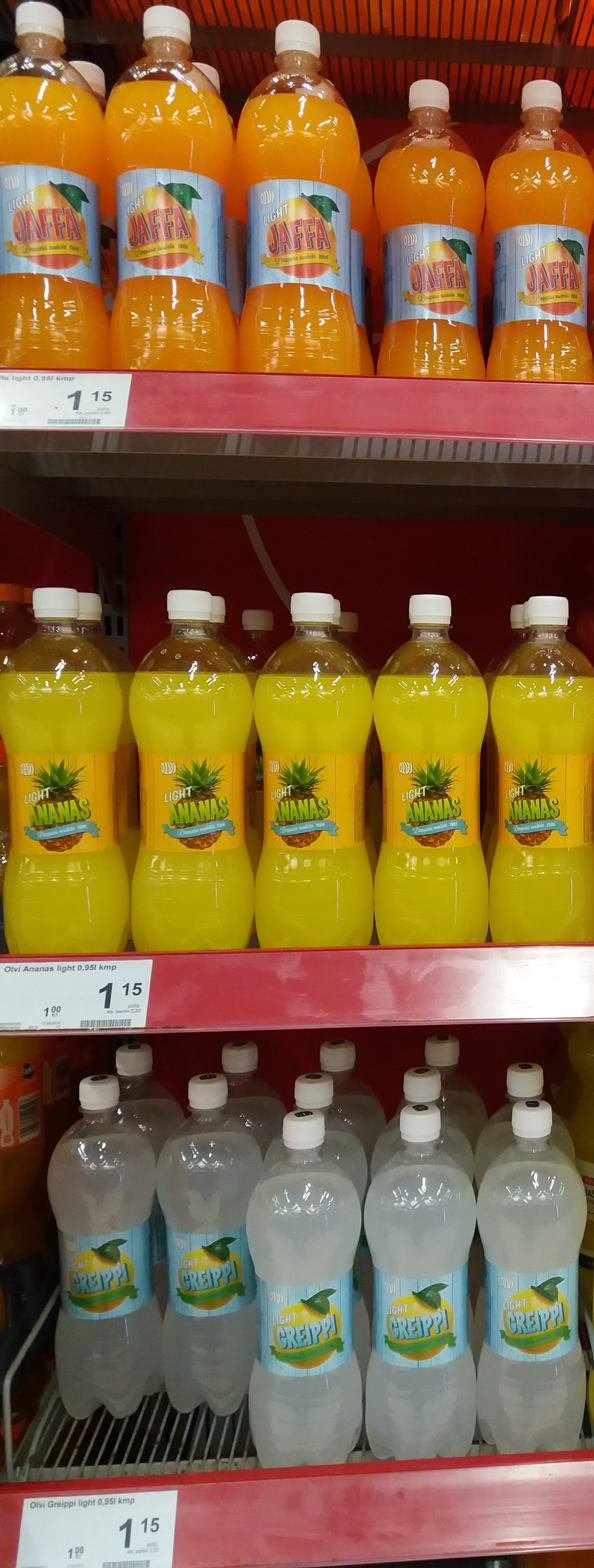
Olvi soft drinks

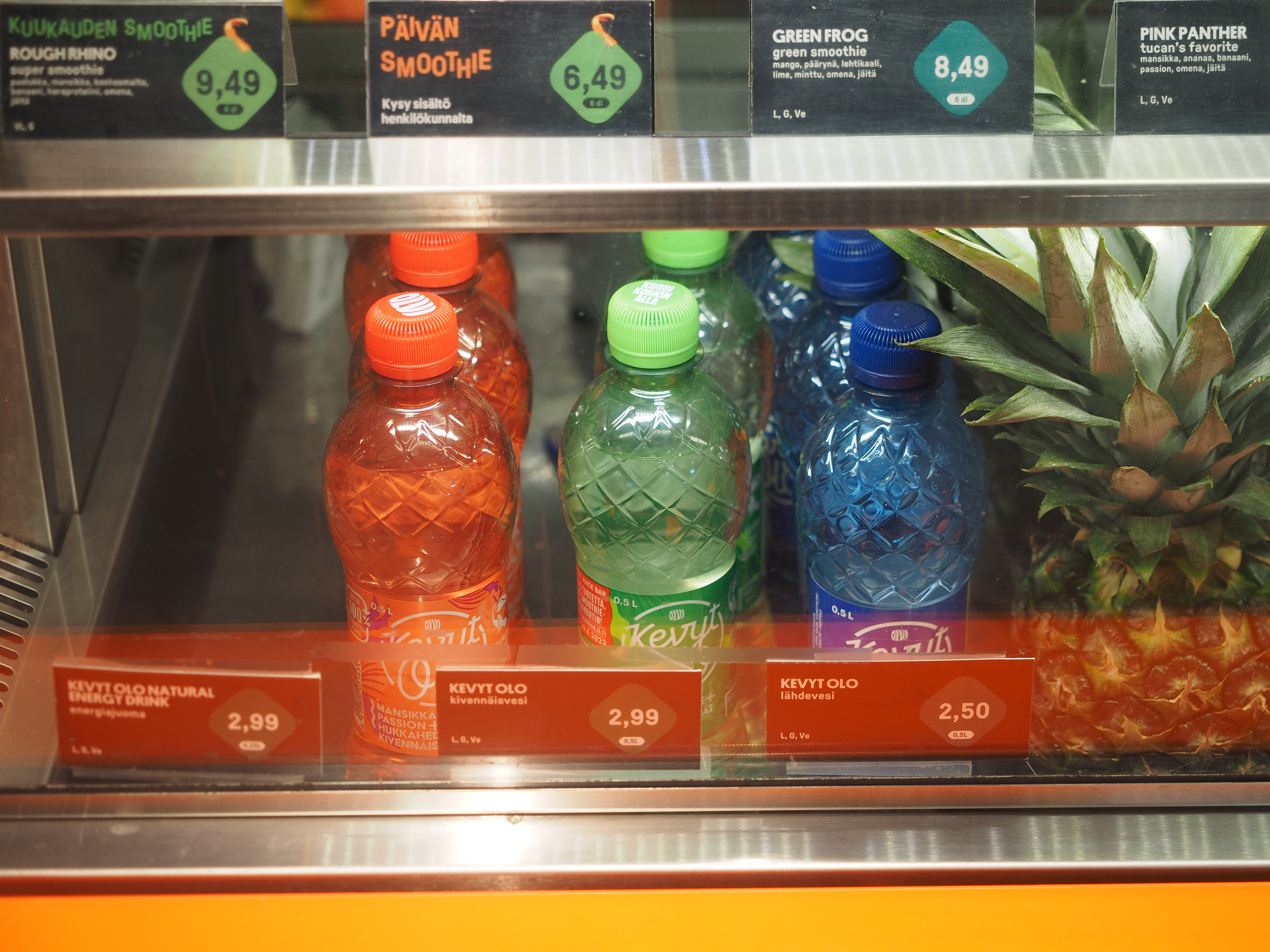
Olvi "Kevyt Olo" Mineral water

== See also ==
- Beer in Belarus
