= TEHO =

Finnish caffeinated energy drink

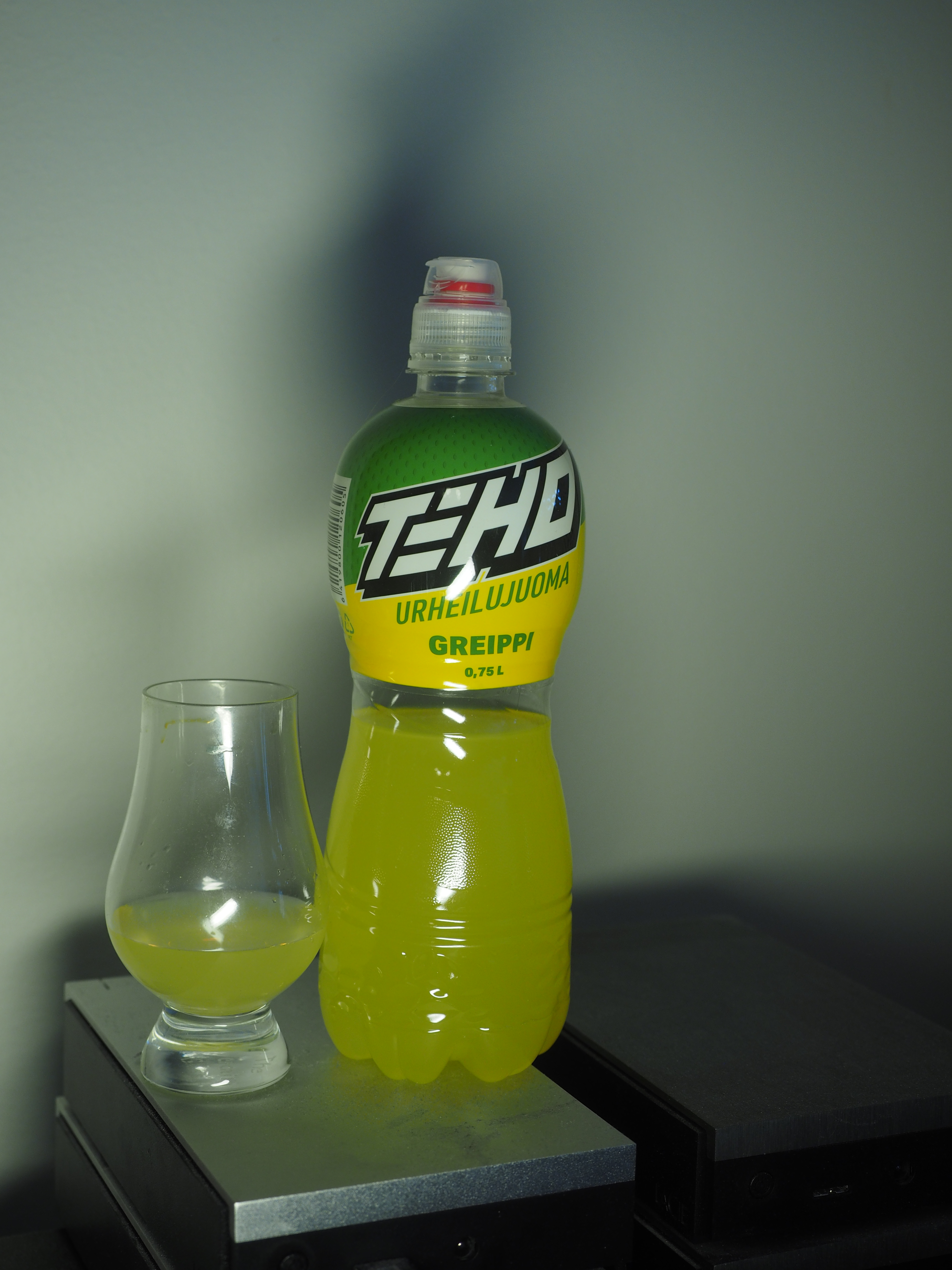
- Type: Energy drink
- Manufacturer: Olvi
- Country of origin: Finland
- Introduced: 2005

TEHO is an energy drink manufactured by Olvi company of Finland. "Teho" is Finnish and means "efficiency" or "power" in English. It contains caffeine, taurine, guarana, maltodextrose and a small amount of B vitamins. TEHO was first brought to the market in 2005 and was the third most sold energy drink in Finland in 2007.

== Flavours ==
- TEHO
- TEHO Omena-Sitrus, apple-citrus flavour (2009)
- TEHO Kevyt, a sugar free version (discontinued 2008, brought back in 2009 with a new recipe)
- TEHO Energiashotti, energy shot (2010)
- TEHO Kevyt Kola, sugar free cola flavour (discontinued 2007)
- TEHO Energiavesi Sitruuna, lemon-flavoured mineral water with ingredients found in energy drinks (2010)
- TEHO Esport E-Urheilujuoma Mango and Yuzu (2020)

== Ingredients ==
Carbohydrates, fat, protein, niacin, pantothenic acid, vitamin B2, vitamin B6, vitamin B12, caffeine, taurine.
