= Jūrkalne =

Village in Latvia

- Village
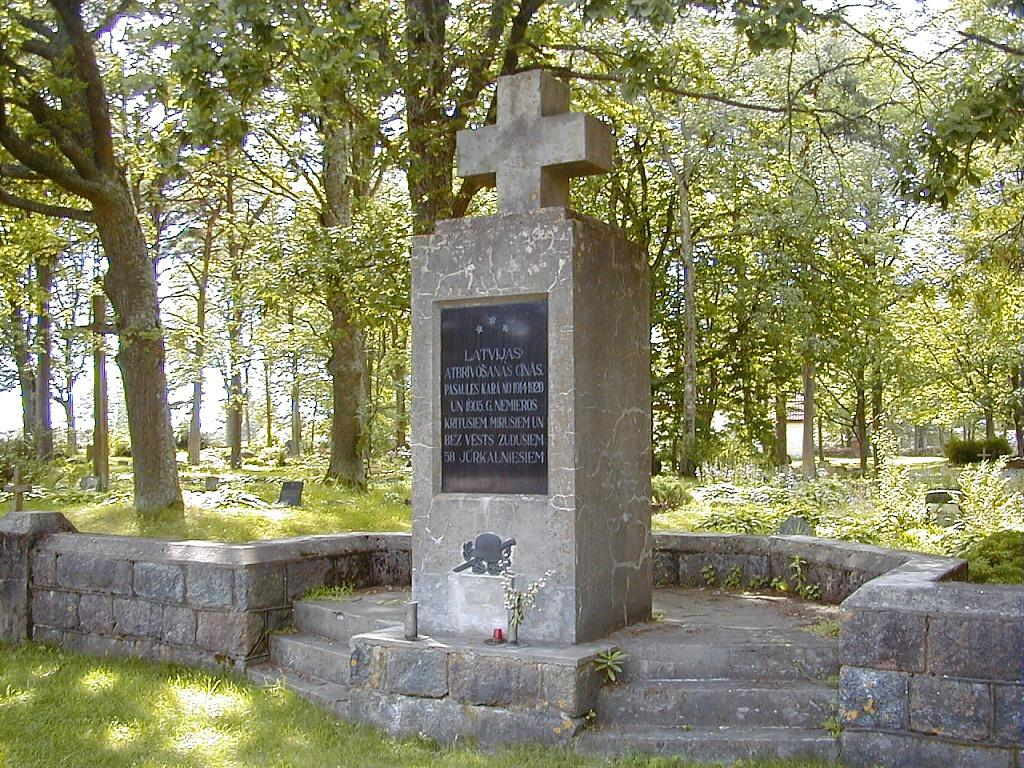
- Monument to the victims of wars and revolutions in Jūrkalne

- Location in Latvia
- Coordinates: 57°00′22″N 21°23′13″E
- Country: Latvia
- Municipality: Ventspils
- Parish: Jūrkalne
- Elevation: 14 m (46 ft)

Population (2015)
  - Total: 238
- Time zone: UTC+2 (Eastern European Time)
  - Summer (DST): UTC+3 (Eastern European Summer Time)
- Website: www.jurkalne.lv

Jūrkalne is a village in Latvia. It is the centre of a parish of the same name within Ventspils Municipality on the Baltic coast. Its former German name was Feliksberg (Felixberg), but its former Latvian name was Medeņciems (Meddenzeem).

Jūrkalne was the birthplace of Abraham Zevi Idelsohn, the Jewish ethnologist and musicologist.
