= Krišjānis Berķis =

Latvian general (1884-1942)

- Born: 26 April 1884; Īslīce parish, Courland Governorate, Russian Empire
- Died: 29 July 1942 (aged 58); Perm Oblast, Soviet Union
- Military career
- Allegiance: Russian Empire; Latvia
- Branch: Army
- Rank: General
- Conflicts: World War I Latvian War of Independence

Krišjānis Berķis (April 26, 1884, in Īslīce parish, Bauska municipality, Courland, modern Latvia – July 29, 1942, in Perm, Russia) was a Latvian general. Rising to prominence as an officer of the Latvian Riflemen in World War I, he was promoted to the rank of general during the Latvian War of Independence, and served on the Army General Staff after the war. After the Soviet occupation of the Baltic States, he was deported to Siberia and died in a Gulag labor camp.

== Biography ==
Krišjānis Berķis was born on April 26, 1884, in the farmer's homestead Bērzkrogs, Īslīce parish, Courland. He graduated from a local parish school and the Bauska city school. After his graduation, he decided to become a soldier, and entered Vilnius military school. He graduated in 1906 in the rank of podporuchik. He then served in the 2nd. Finnish rifleman regiment in Helsinki. During his service in Grand Duchy of Finland, he married a Finnish girl named Hilma Lehtonen (1887-1961). In 1909 he was promoted to Poruchik, and in 1913, to Stabskapitan.

=== First World War ===
In 1914, Berķis as an officer in the Finnish corps of the Russian Army was deployed to the front in East Prussia. He served as a company commander, and later as battalion commander. He participated in battles near the Masurian lakes. In January 1915, the Finnish Corps was deployed to the south-eastern front in the Carpathians. Berķis was promoted to captain and participated in many battles, including Brusilov's offensive in 1916. In 1917, he was promoted to lieutenant colonel and after many requests, was finally transferred to the Latvian Rifleman units. He became the battalion commander in the 6th. Tukums Latvian rifleman regiment, but from October, he commanded the whole regiment. With his regiment, he participated in Battle of Jugla, securing to main Russian units safe withdrawal from Riga. In November 1917, he refused to join the Red Army, ⁣ and was dismissed from his post. He went to Finland to be with his family.

=== Latvian War of independence ===
When the Finnish Civil War started in 1918, Berķis with his family went to Smolensk, Russia. Later, however, he passed through Latvia and Estonia to return to Finland. In autumn of 1918, Berķis learned from newspapers about the proclamation of the Latvian Republic and the forming of its first military units. In March 1919, he managed to get to Tallinn where he met delegates of the Latvian government. Soon after, he met with Colonel Jorģis Zemitāns, and on 21 March, he enlisted in the Latvian armed forces. He was ordered to form a Latvian reserve battalion. After two months, the battalion became a regiment. Later it became the 2nd Cēsis Infantry Regiment, and Berķis was appointed as commander. In May 1919, the regiment was deployed to the front and participated in battles in Vidzeme. On 1 June, the regiment entered Valmiera, and later Cēsis. After fighting in Battle of Cēsis, the regiment chased retreating Germans until the Strazdumiža Ceasefire. On 6 July with other Latvian units, the regiment entered Riga. In August, Berķis was appointed commander of the 3rd Latgale Infantry Division and was promoted to Colonel in October. He participated in all battles against Bermontians, and later also in the liberation of Latgale.

=== Post-War years ===
After the Latvian War of independence, he stayed in the military and continued his service as commander of the 3rd Latgale Infantry Division. In 1925, he was promoted to General. In 1930, he graduated 8 monthlong officer courses. Later he was moved to Army HQ. Berkis was one of Prime Minister Kārlis Ulmanis' principal co-conspirators in the coup d'état of May 15, 1934. After the coup, he was appointed commander of the 2nd Vidzeme Infantry Division and commander of the Riga garrison. He served as Commander-in-Chief of the Army from 1934 to 1940, and briefly became Minister of War in the spring of 1940. In his short term as minister, he tried to promote Latvian cooperation with Estonia, Finland and even Great Britain, but it was too late.

After the Soviet occupation of Latvia in 1940, he was dismissed from his post and retired from the army. Together with his family, he managed to get to Finland; however, on 12 July, he decided to return to Latvia. On his way back, some friends managed to discourage Berķis from such a move, and he stopped in Tallinn. There, he was arrested by the Soviet authorities and deported to Usollag, Molotov Oblast, Siberia, where he died in a prison hospital in 1942. His only child, Valentīns (1910–1944), died in Russia, and their grandson went missing.

== Decorations ==
- Latvian military Order of Lāčplēsis, all three classes (1920, 1927, 1927)
- Order of the Three Stars, 1st (15 November 1935) and 2nd classes
- Order of Viesturs, 1st class
- Aizsargi Cross of Merit
- Lithuanian Order of the Cross of Vytis, 1st class
- French Order of the Legion of Honour, 3rd, 4th, 5th class
- Order of the White Rose of Finland, 1st and 2nd class
- Cross of Liberty (Estonia), 1st class 2nd degree
- Order of Leopold II (Belgium)
- Order of the Lithuanian Grand Duke Gediminas, 1st class
- Order of Polonia Restituta, 1st class
- Order of the Cross of the Eagle, 1st and 2nd class
- Orders of the Russian Empire: St. Stanislav II, III class, St. Anna II, III, IV class, St. Vladimir IV class, Cross of St. George IV class

== See also ==
- List of Latvian Army generals

== Sources ==
- Rislakki, Jukka: Latvian kohtalonvuodet. Krisjanis Berkiksen ja Hilma Lehtosen tarina. SKS, Helsinki 2005. (With English summary)
- Rislakki, Jukka: Kur beidzas varaviksne. Jumava, Riga 2004.
