= Zlēkas Parish =

Parish of Latvia

- parish of Latvia
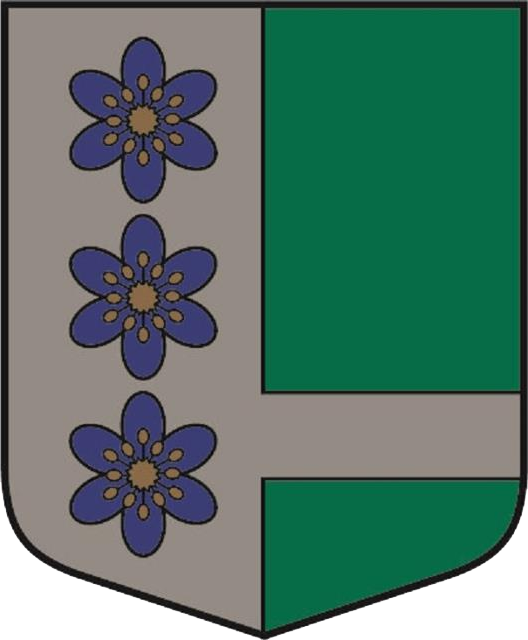
- Coat of arms

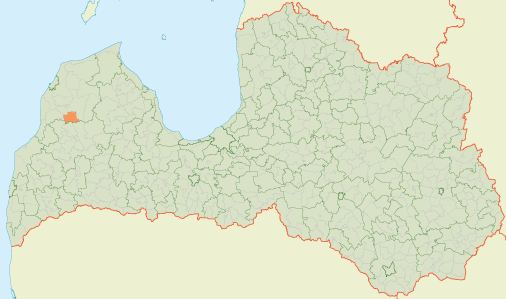
- 57°08′04″N 21°52′05″E
- Country: Latvia

Area
  - Total: 107.28 km^{2} (41.42 sq mi)
  - Land: 104.4 km^{2} (40.3 sq mi)
  - Water: 2.88 km^{2} (1.11 sq mi)

Population (1 January 2024)
  - Total: 410
  - Density: 3.8/km^{2} (9.9/sq mi)

Zlēkas Parish (Latvian: Zlēku pagasts) is an administrative unit of Ventspils Municipality in the Courland region of Latvia.The parish has a population of 421 (as of 2023) and covers an area of 107.155 km^{2}.

== Villages of Zlēkas Parish ==
- Krācnieki
- Laidzesciems
- Pasilciems
- Vāverciems
- Veclīcnieki
- Zlēkas
