= Užava Parish =

Parish of Latvia

- parish of Latvia
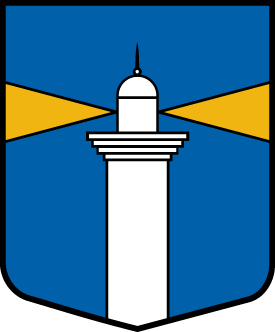
- Coat of arms

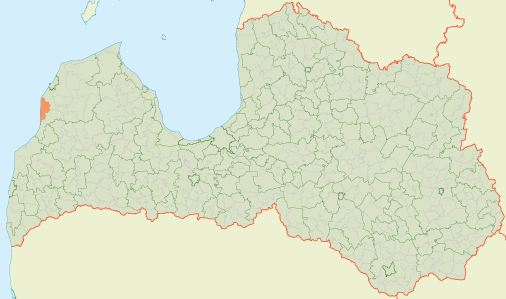
- 57°11′42″N 21°27′56″E
- Country: Latvia

Area
  - Total: 125.36 km^{2} (48.40 sq mi)
  - Land: 122.84 km^{2} (47.43 sq mi)
  - Water: 2.52 km^{2} (0.97 sq mi)

Population (1 January 2024)
  - Total: 459
  - Density: 3.7/km^{2} (9.5/sq mi)

Užava parish (Latvian: Užavas pagasts) is an administrative unit of Ventspils Municipality in the Courland region of Latvia. The parish has a population of 619 (as of 1/07/2010) and covers an area of 125.518 km^{2}.

== History ==
The territory of modern Užava parish historically housed Sārnate manor (Gut Sernaten, east of Sārnate ) and Užava manor (Gut Hasau, Užava). Užava parish was established during the First World War, separating it from Ziras Parish. In 1935, the area of Užava parish was 138 km2 and 1947 inhabitants lived there. In 1945, Užava, Lībciems and Sārnate village councils were established in the parish, but in 1949 the parish was liquidated. The village of Užava belonged to Ventspils (1949–1962), Kuldīga (1962–1967) and again Ventspils (after 1967) districts. In 1950, the village of Lībciems was added to the village of Užava, but in 1961 it was part of the village of Jūrkalne. In 1990, the village was reorganized into a parish. In 2009, Užava parish was included as an administrative territory in Ventspils region.

== Villages of Užava parish ==
- Dzirtniekciems
- Lībciems
- Sārnate
- Silmalas
- Užava (parish center)
- Vendzavas (Užava Parish)

== See also ==
- Užava lowland
