= Ugāle Parish =

Parish of Latvia

- parish of Latvia
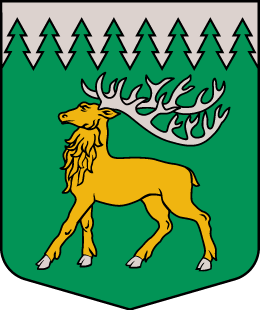
- Coat of arms

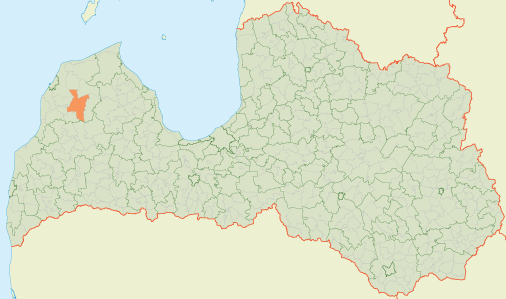
- 57°14′17″N 21°58′12″E
- Country: Latvia

Area
  - Total: 292.29 km^{2} (112.85 sq mi)
  - Land: 288.05 km^{2} (111.22 sq mi)
  - Water: 4.24 km^{2} (1.64 sq mi)

Population (1 January 2025)
  - Total: 1,776
  - Density: 6.166/km^{2} (15.97/sq mi)

Ugāle parish (Latvian: Ugāles pagasts) is an administrative unit of the Ventspils Municipality in the Courland region of Latvia.The parish has a population of 1800 (as of 01/01/2024) Ugāle parish covers an area of 292.239 km^{2}.

== Villages of Ugāle parish ==
- Ciesengure
- Cirkale
- Māteri
- Modes
- Rāpati
- Sirgumi
- Ugāle
- Ugāles dzirnavas
