= Ziras Parish =

Parish of Latvia

- parish of Latvia
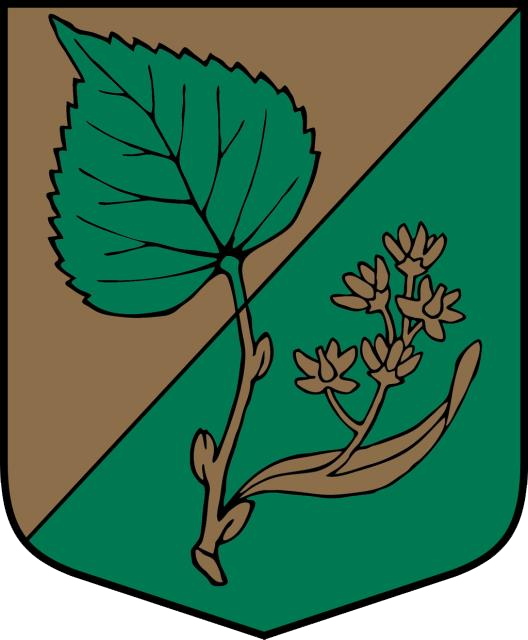
- Coat of arms

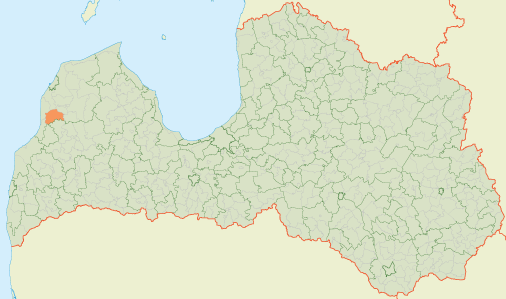
- 57°08′21″N 21°36′37″E
- Country: Latvia

Area
  - Total: 149.40 km^{2} (57.68 sq mi)
  - Land: 149.4 km^{2} (57.7 sq mi)
  - Water: 4.28 km^{2} (1.65 sq mi)

Population (1 January 2024)
  - Total: 427
  - Density: 2.9/km^{2} (7.4/sq mi)

Ziras Parish (Latvian: Ziru pagasts) is an administrative unit of Ventspils Municipality in the Courland region of Latvia.The parish has a population of 543 (as of 1/07/2010) and covers an area of 153.80 km^{2}.

== History ==
In the territory of modern Ziras parish there were historically Vendzava manor (Gut Wensau, Vendzavas) and Ziru manor (Gut Sirgen, Ziras). In 1935, the area of Ziras Parish in Ventspils district was 90 km² and there were 1227 inhabitants. In 1945, Sise and Zira village councils were established in the parish, but in 1949 the parish was liquidated. The village of Zira belonged to Alsunga district (1949-1956), Ventspils (1956-1962), Kuldīga (1962-1967) and again Ventspils (1967-2009) districts. The liquidated village of Sises was added to Ziru village in 1954. In 1990, the village was reorganized into a parish. In 2009, Ziras parish was included as an administrative territory in Ventspils Municipality.

== Villages of Ziras Parish ==
- Bētciems
- Sise, Latvia
- Tērande
- Vendzavas
- Ziras (parish center)

== See also ==
- Užava lowland
