= Pope Parish =

Parish of Latvia

- parish of Latvia
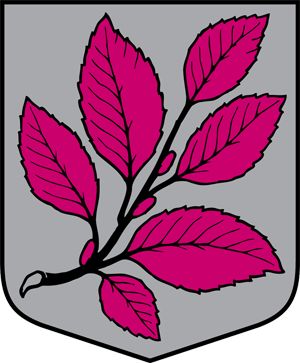
- Coat of arms

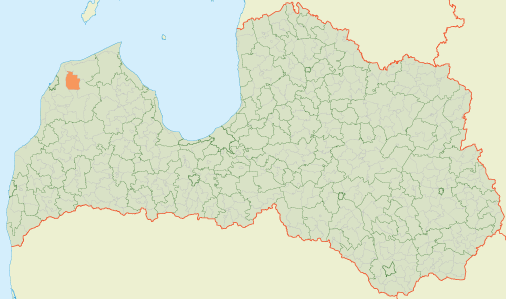
- 57°25′39″N 21°52′31″E

- Location within Latvia
- Country: Latvia

Area
  - Total: 167.67 km^{2} (64.74 sq mi)
  - Land: 163.15 km^{2} (62.99 sq mi)
  - Water: 4.52 km^{2} (1.75 sq mi)

Population (1 January 2026)
  - Total: 822
  - Density: 5.04/km^{2} (13.0/sq mi)

Pope parish (Latvian: Popes pagasts) is an administrative unit of the Ventspils Municipality in the Courland region of Latvia.The parish has a population of 1126 (as of 1/07/2010) and covers an area of 167.745 km^{2}.

Pope Wind Farm, currently largest wind farm in Latvia, is located in the parish.

== Villages of Pope parish ==
- Jaunāmuiža
- Pope
- Topciems
- Vēde

== See also ==
- Pope Palace
