= Vārve Parish =

Parish of Latvia

- parish of Latvia
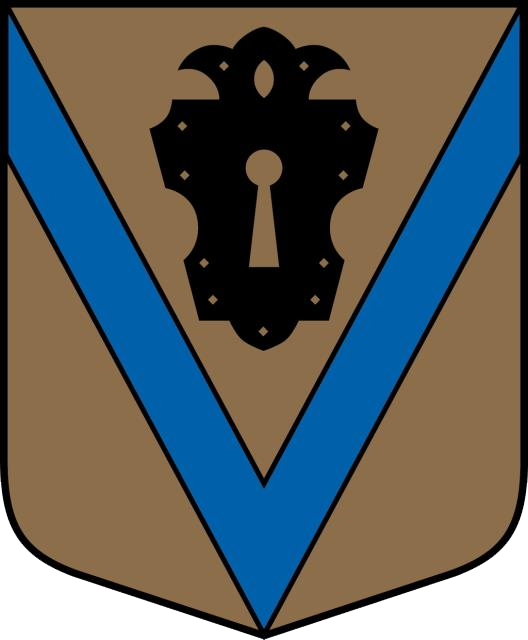
- Coat of arms

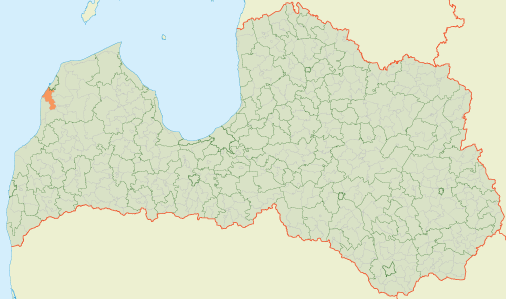
- 57°17′08″N 21°32′26″E
- Country: Latvia

Area
  - Total: 125.15 km^{2} (48.32 sq mi)
  - Land: 120.35 km^{2} (46.47 sq mi)
  - Water: 4.8 km^{2} (1.9 sq mi)

Population (1 January 2025)
  - Total: 1,462
  - Density: 12.15/km^{2} (31.46/sq mi)

Vārve parish (Latvian: Vārves pagasts) is an administrative unit of Ventspils Municipality in the Courland region of Latvia.The parish has a population of 1506 (as of 2023) and covers an area of 125.442 km^{2}.

== Villages of Vārve parish ==
- Celužu ciems
- Cirpstenes dižciems
- Cirpstenes mazciems
- Grigaļu ciems
- Jaunmuiža
- Leči
- Liezdes ciems
- Mežsētas
- Pasiekstes ciems
- Roces ciems
- Silnieku ciems
- Vārve
- Veltiņu ciems
- Ventava
- Zūras
