= Īslīce Parish =

Parish of Latvia

- parish of Latvia
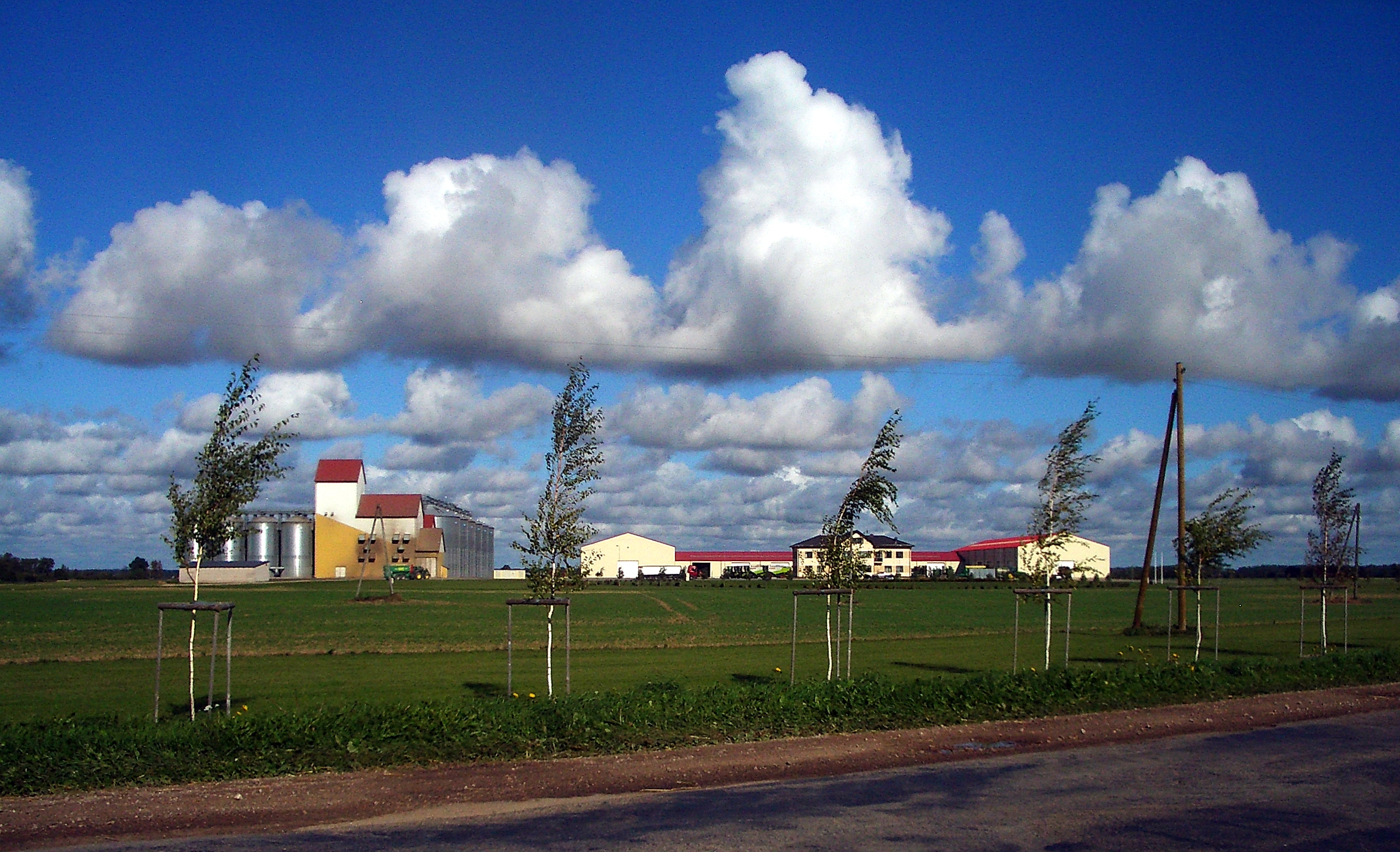

- Coat of arms

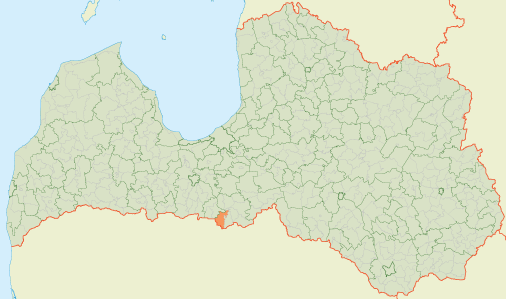
- 56°19′51″N 24°06′52″E
- Country: Latvia

Area
  - Total: 101.64 km^{2} (39.24 sq mi)
  - Land: 101.64 km^{2} (39.24 sq mi)
  - Water: 1.43 km^{2} (0.55 sq mi)

Population (1 January 2025)
  - Total: 2,427
  - Density: 23.88/km^{2} (61.84/sq mi)

Īslīce Parish (Latvian: Īslīces pagasts) is an administrative unit of Bauska Municipality in the Semigallia region of Latvia.

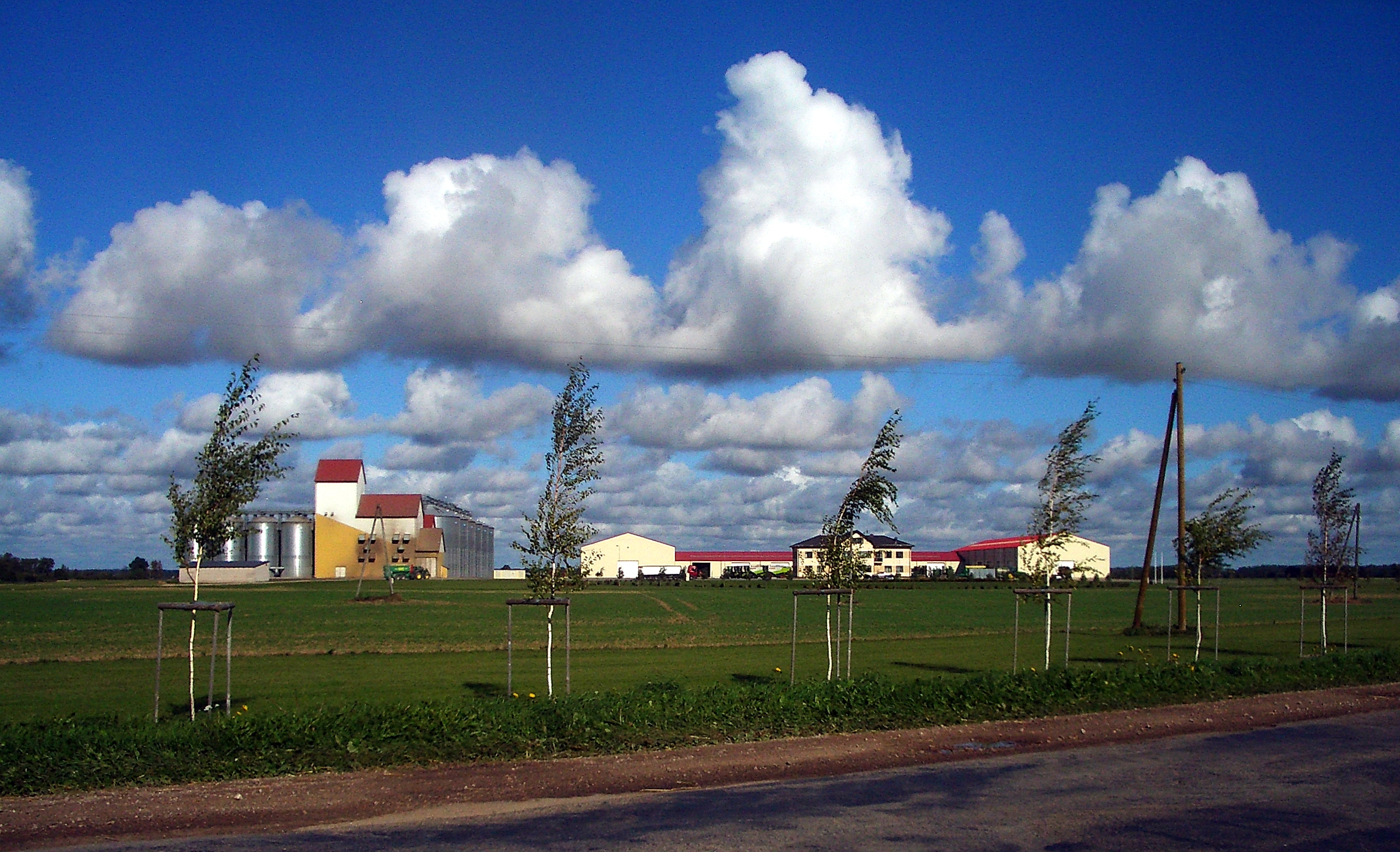
Agricultural complex at Bērzi village

== Towns, villages and settlements of Īslīce parish ==
- Rītausmas - parish administrative center

== Notable people ==
- Krišjānis Berķis
