= Puze Parish =

Parish of Latvia

- parish of Latvia
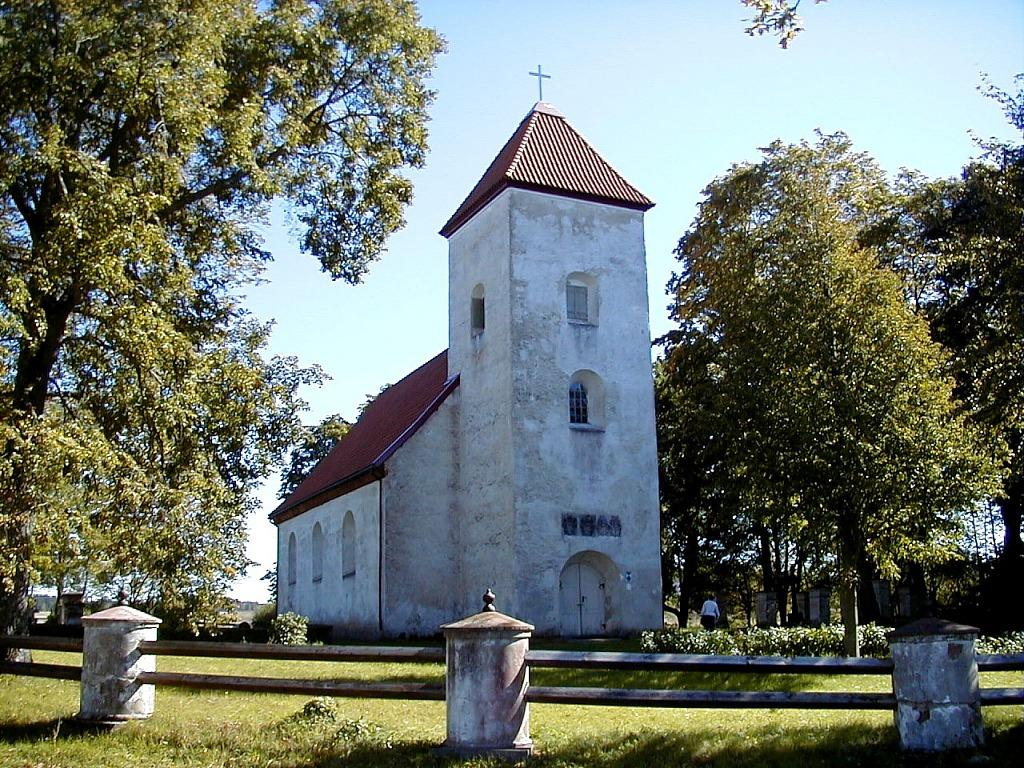

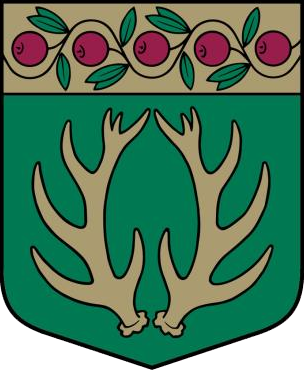
- Coat of arms

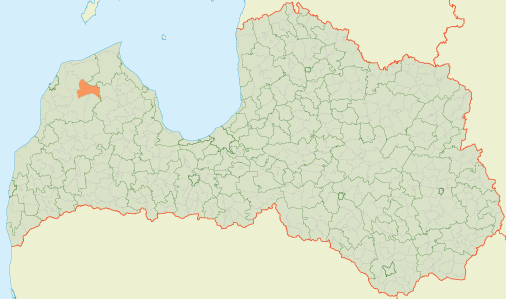
- 57°21′51″N 22°06′22″E

- Location within Latvia
- Country: Latvia

Area
  - Total: 207.34 km^{2} (80.05 sq mi)
  - Land: 197.11 km^{2} (76.10 sq mi)
  - Water: 10.23 km^{2} (3.95 sq mi)

Population (1 January 2026)
  - Total: 678
  - Density: 3.44/km^{2} (8.91/sq mi)

Puze Parish (Latvian: Puzes pagasts) is an administrative unit of the Ventspils Municipality in the Courland region of Latvia. The parish has a population of 1021 (as of 1/07/2010) and covers an area of 207.28 km^{2}.

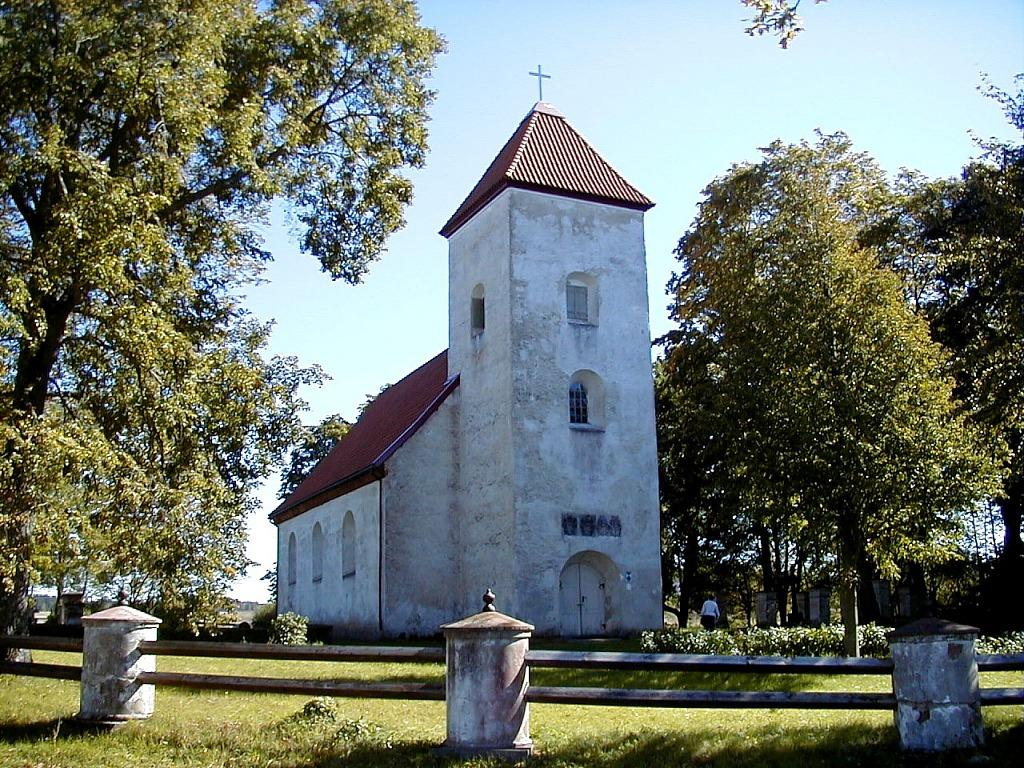
Lutheran church in Puze village

== Villages of Puze parish ==
- Amele
- Dandzītes
- Līcnieki
- Nīcciems
- Nīcnieki
- Puze (Blāzma)
- Puzenieki
- Puzesmuiža
- Stikli
- Trebējciems
