= Usma Parish =

Parish of Latvia

- parish of Latvia
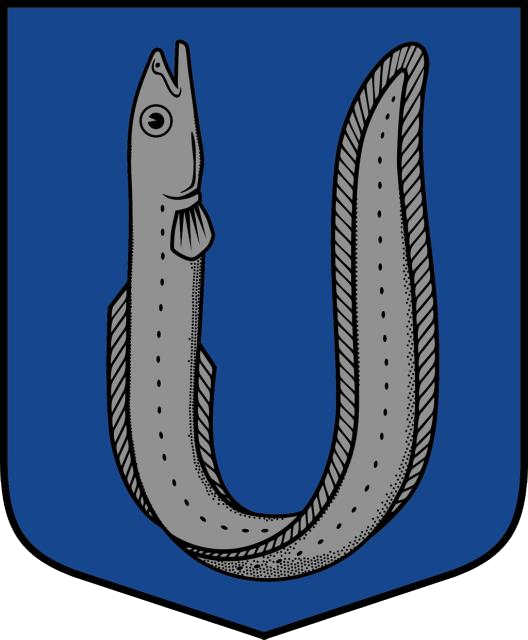
- Coat of arms

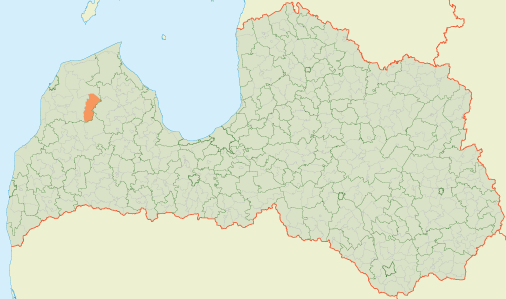
- 57°13′25″N 22°09′33″E
- Country: Latvia

Area
  - Total: 219.54 km^{2} (84.76 sq mi)
  - Land: 177.96 km^{2} (68.71 sq mi)
  - Water: 41.58 km^{2} (16.05 sq mi)

Population (1 January 2025)
  - Total: 452
  - Density: 2.54/km^{2} (6.58/sq mi)

Usma Parish (Latvian: Usmas pagasts) is an administrative unit of Ventspils Municipality in the Courland region of Latvia. The parish has a population of 506 (as of 2023) and covers an area of 219.509 km^{2}.

== Villages of Usma Parish ==
- Amjūdze
- Desuciems
- Ugāles dzirnavas
- Usma
- Usmas stacija
- Zaļais ciems
- Žatu ciems
