= Jūrkalne Parish =

Parish of Latvia

- parish of Latvia
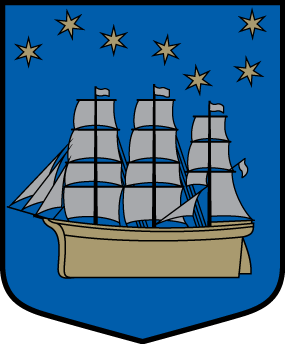
- Coat of arms

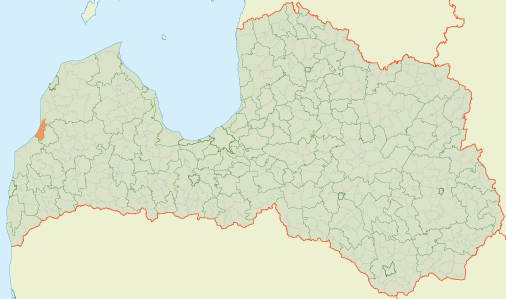
- 57°01′12″N 21°26′09″E
- Country: Latvia

Area
  - Total: 99.64 km^{2} (38.47 sq mi)
  - Land: 96.59 km^{2} (37.29 sq mi)
  - Water: 3.05 km^{2} (1.18 sq mi)

Population (1 January 2024)
  - Total: 346
  - Density: 3.5/km^{2} (9.0/sq mi)

Jūrkalne Parish (Latvian: Jūrkalnes pagasts) is an administrative unit of Ventspils Municipality in the Courland region of Latvia. The parish has a population of 369 (as of 1/07/2010) and covers an area of 99.59 km^{2}.

== Villages of Jūrkalne parish ==
- Jūrkalne
