= Ventspils Municipality =

Municipality of Latvia

Coordinates: 57°23′N 21°33′E

Ventspils Municipality Ventspils novads Vǟnta mōgõn
- Municipality
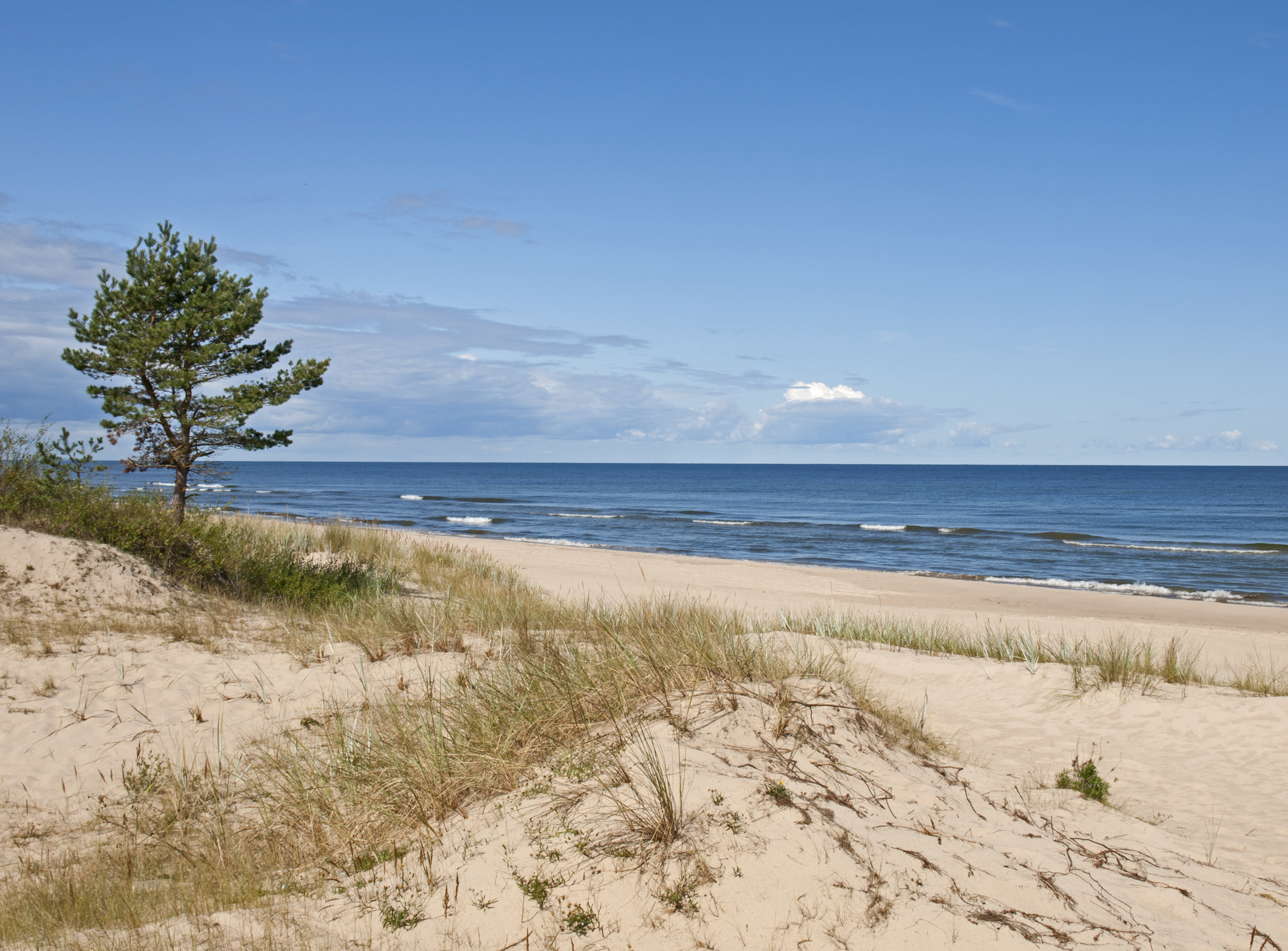
- Baltic Sea coast near Miķeļtornis

- Flag Coat of arms

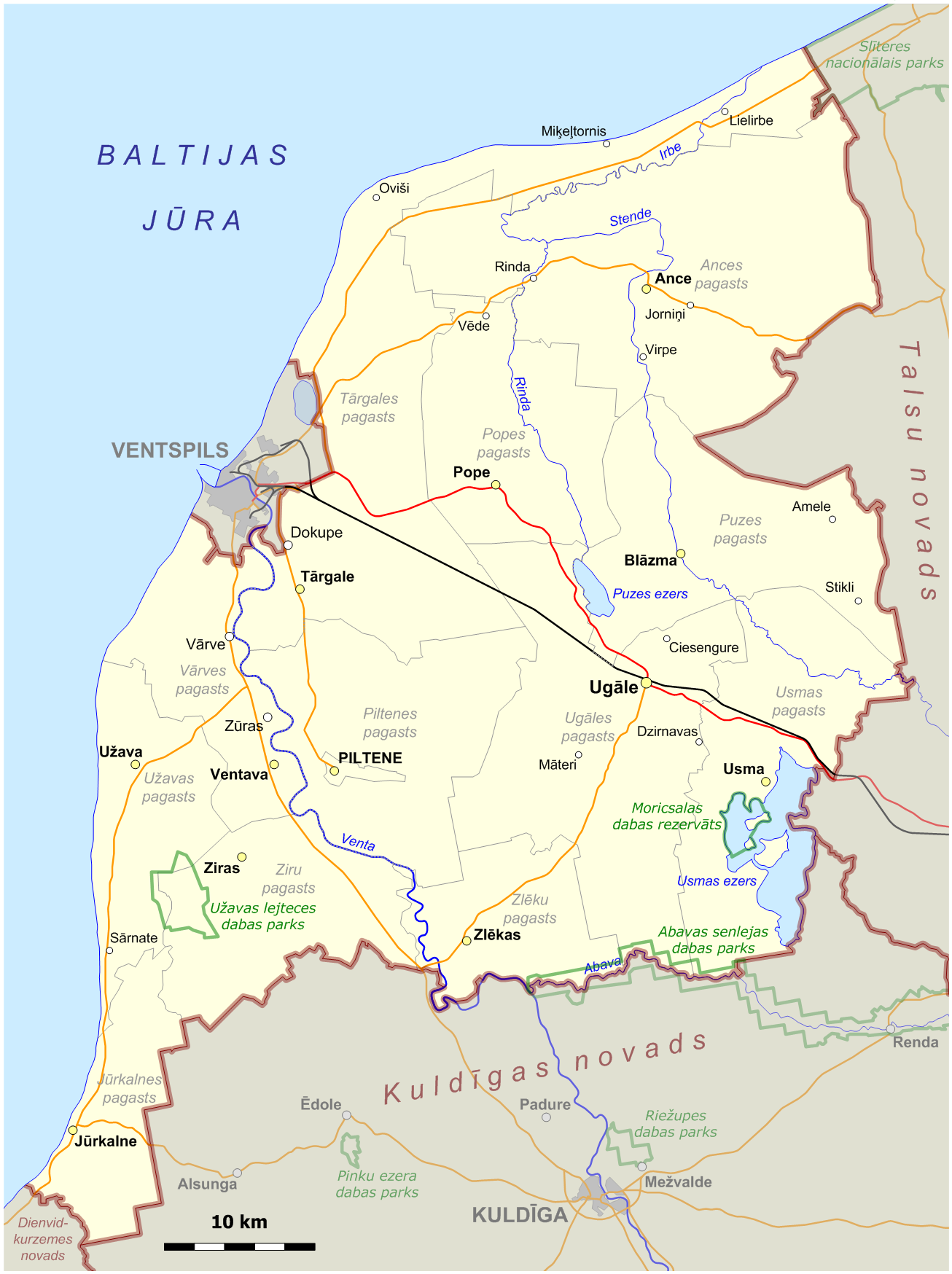
- Country: Latvia
- Formed: 2009
- Centre: Ventspils (extraterritorially)

Government
  - Council Chair: Andis Zariņš (NA)

Area
  - Total: 2,458.62 km^{2} (949.28 sq mi)

Population (2026)
  - Total: 10,161
  - Density: 4.1328/km^{2} (10.704/sq mi)
- Website: www.ventspilsnovads.lv

Ventspils Municipality (Latvian: Ventspils novads; Livonian: Vǟnta mōgõn) is a municipality in Courland, Latvia. The municipality was formed in 2009 by merging Piltene town, Ance Parish, Jūrkalne Parish, Piltene rural community (from 2010 Piltene Parish), Pope Parish, Puze Parish, Tārgale Parish, Ugāle Parish, Usma Parish, Užava Parish, Vārve Parish, Ziras Parish and Zlēkas Parish. It is administered from Ventspils city, which is not included within its limits. The population in 2023 was 10,512.

== Notable people ==
- George Henry Loskiel (1740 in Rinda / Ance Parish – 1814), bishop of the American province of the Moravian Church (1802–1811).
- Uļi Kīnkamäg (1869 in Miķeļtornis – 1932), a Livonian nationalist and religious zealot
- Abraham Zevi Idelsohn (1882 in Jūrkalne / Feliksberg – 1938), a prominent Jewish ethnomusicologist and composer.
- Max Reyter (1886 in Sirgen – 1950), a Russian and Soviet military officer
- Karlis Princis (1893 in Venta – 1978), biologist who contributed studied Blattodea (an order of insects]

== See also ==
- Administrative divisions of Latvia
