= Ordensburg =

Type of castle built by German Crusaders

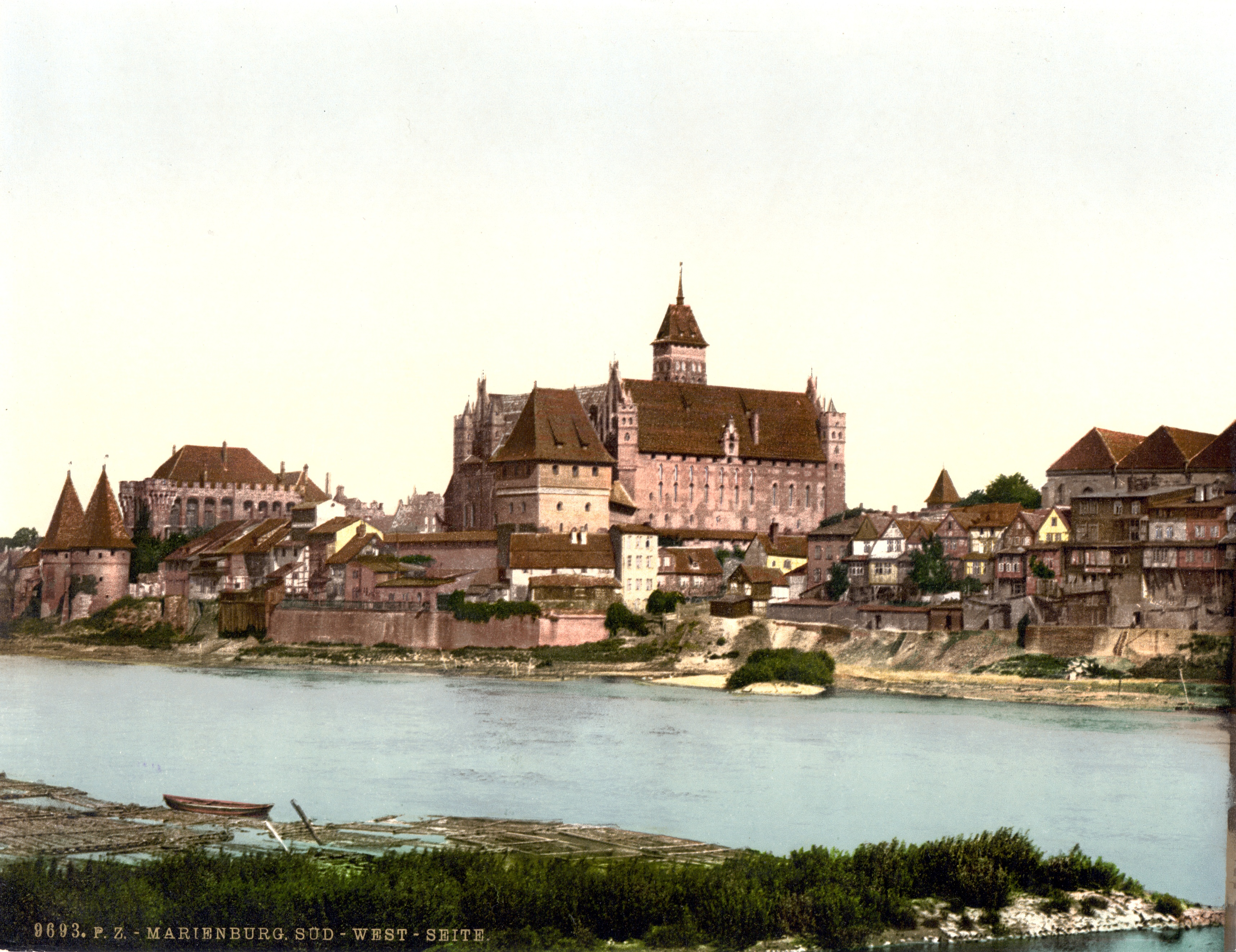
The Ordensburg Marienburg, c. 1900, during the German Empire

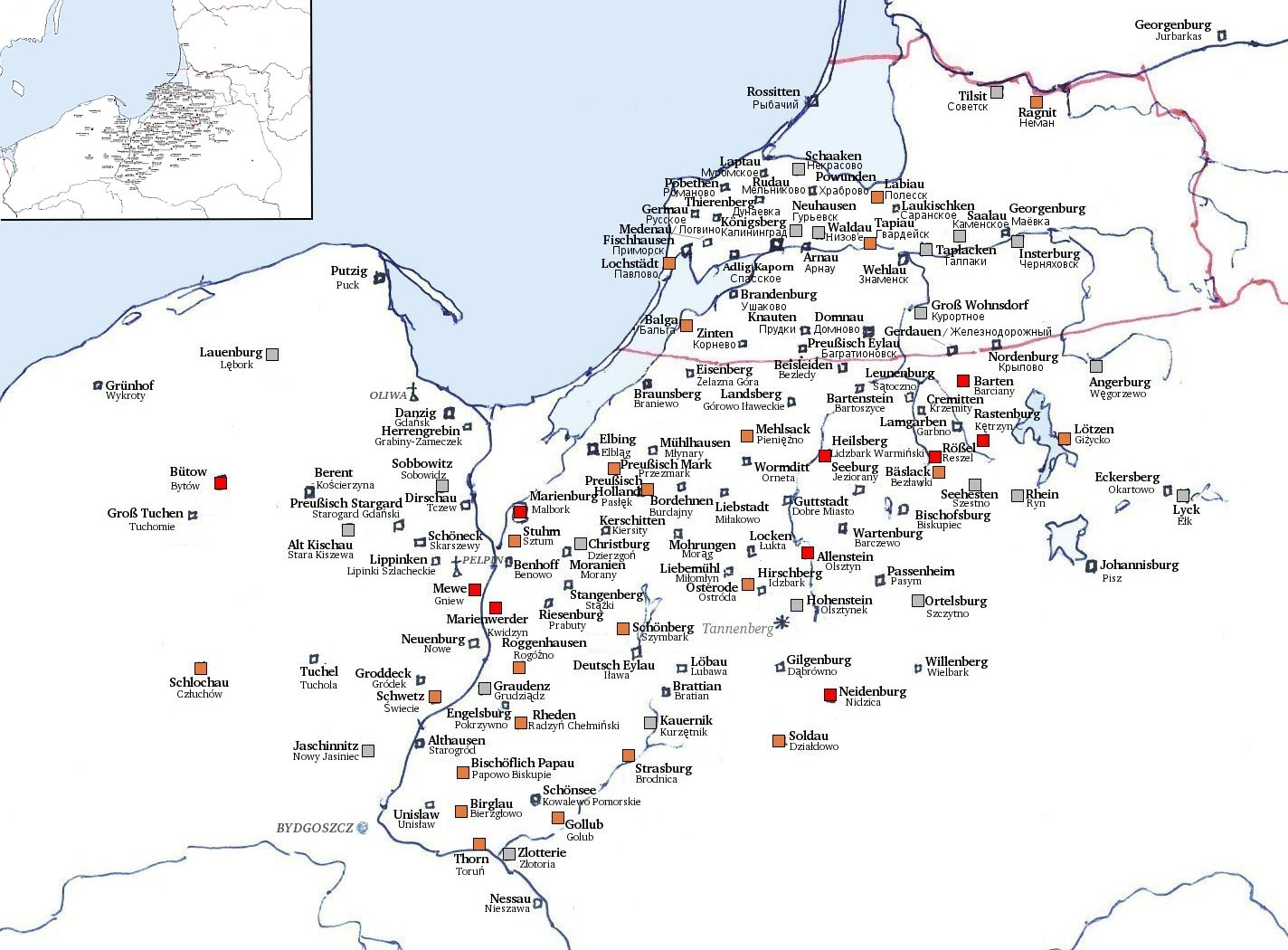
A map of Ordensburgen of the Teutonic Order in Prussia

Ordensburg (plural Ordensburgen) is a German term meaning a "castle of a (military) order". It is used specifically for the fortified structures built by crusading German military orders during the Middle Ages.

== Medieval Ordensburgen ==
Ordensburgen were originally constructed by the Livonian Brothers of the Sword and later by the Teutonic Order to fortify territory in Prussia and Livonia captured from the native populations – Old Prussians, Lithuanians and native peoples of what is now Latvia and Estonia. Later, Ordensburgen were used to attack Lithuania.

Since they were built and used by religious military orders, the Ordensburgen often resembled monasteries. While they were considerably larger than those in the Holy Roman Empire, they were much scarcer in the Monastic state of the Teutonic Knights.

While a normal castle in the Holy Roman Empire would control about 38 km^{2}, a castle would control 370 km^{2} in Prussia and 789 km^{2} in Livonia, Courland and Estonia. The few small castles are considered to be of vassals, while the larger ones might have served as arsenals and strongholds during the Northern Crusades. They were purpose-built to colonize the respective countries and peoples by capturing and holding territory.

Most Ordensburgen were rectangular, even quadratic in form, built from red brick and lacking a Bergfried (a type of keep). Many castles had no towers at all, as the bailey (a mighty quadrangle) was considered sufficient for defence.

=== List of medieval Ordensburgen ===
- Adsel (Gaujiena, Latvia) - a genuine Ordensburg, seat of a commandery
- Allenstein (Olsztyn, Poland)
- Alschwangen (Alsunga, Latvia) - a genuine Ordensburg
- Altona (Altene, Latvia)
- Angern (Angerja, Estonia) - vassal castle
- Angerburg (Węgorzewo, Poland)
- Arensburg (Kuressaare, Estonia) - a bishop's castle
- Arrasch (Āraiši, Latvia)
- Ascheraden (Aizkraukle, Latvia) - a genuine Ordensburg, seat of a commandery
- Ass (Kiltsi, Estonia) - vassal castle
- Bäslack (Bezławki, Poland)
- Balga (Balga, Kaliningrad Oblast, Russia)
- Barten (Barciany, Poland)
- Bauske (Bauska, Latvia) - a genuine Ordensburg, seat of a bailiff
- Bebern
- Berson (Bērzaune, Latvia)
- Birgelau (Bierzgłowo, Poland)
- Borkholm (Porkuni, Estonia) - a bishop's castle
- Brandenburg on Frisches Haff (Ushakovo, Kaliningrad Oblast, Russia)
- Burtneck (Burtnieki, Latvia) - a genuine Ordensburg, seat of lower officials
- Bütow (Bytów, Poland)
- Caymen (Zarechye, Kaliningrad Oblast, Russia)
- Danzig (Gdańsk, Poland)
- Dibau (Podgórz, Poland)
- Doblen (Dobele, Latvia) - a genuine Ordensburg, seat of a commandery
- Domnau (Domnovo, Kaliningrad Oblast, Russia)
- Dondangen (Dundaga, Latvia) - a bishop's castle
- Dorpat (Tartu, Estonia) - a bishop's castle
- Dünaburg (Daugavpils, Latvia) - a genuine order castle, seat of a commandery
- Dünamünde (Daugavgrīva, Latvia) - a genuine order castle, seat of a commandery
- Durben (Durbe, Latvia)
- Eckersburg (Okartowo, Poland)
- Edwahlen (Ēdole, Latvia) - a bishop's castle
- Engelsburg (Pokrzywno, Poland)
- Elbing (Elbląg, Poland)
- Erlaa (Ērgļi, Latvia)
- Ermes (Ērģeme, Latvia)
- Falkenau (Kärkna, Estonia) - monastery
- Fellin (Viljandi, Estonia) - a genuine Ordensburg, seat of a commandery
- Fickel (Vigala, Estonia) - vassal castle
- Georgenburg (Mayovka, Kaliningrad Oblast, Russia)
- Goldingen (Kuldīga, Latvia)
- Gollub (Golub-Dobrzyń, Poland)
- Graudenz (Grudziądz, Poland)
- Grobin (Grobiņa, Latvia) - a genuine Ordensburg, seat of a bailiff
- Groß Roop (Lielstraupe, Latvia) - a bishop's castle
- Hapsal (Haapsalu, Estonia) - a bishop's castle
- Hasenpoth (Aizpute, Latvia)
- Heilsberg (Lidzbark Warmiński, Poland)
- Helmat (Helme, Estonia) - a genuine Ordensburg
- Hochrosen (Augstroze, Latvia)
- Hofzumberg (Tērvete, Latvia)
- Holme (Mārtiņsala, Latvia)
- Insterburg (Chernyakhovsk, Kaliningrad Oblast, Russia)
- Jaschnitz (Nowy Jasiniec, Poland)
- Johannisburg (Pisz, Poland)
- Kalzenau (Kalsnava, Latvia)
- Kandau (Kandava, Latvia)
- Karkus (Karksi, Estonia) - a genuine Ordensburg, seat of a bailiff
- Kirrumpäh (Kirumpää, Estonia) - a bishop's castle
- Königsberg (Kaliningrad, Kaliningrad Oblast, Russia) - a genuine Ordensburg, seat of the Grand Master of the Teutonic Order
- Kokenhusen (Koknese, Latvia) - a bishop's castle
- Kremon (Krimulda, Latvia) - a bishop's castle
- Kyda (Kiiu, Estonia) - vassal castle
- Labiau (Polessk, Kaliningrad Oblast, Russia)
- Lais (Laiuse, Estonia) - a genuine Ordensburg
- Lamgraben (Grabno, Poland)
- Leal (Lihula, Estonia) - built and held jointly by order and bishop
- Lemsal (Limbaži, Latvia)
- Leipe (Lipienek, Poland)
- Lennewarden (Lielvārde, Latvia) - a bishop's castle
- Lochstädt (Baltiysk, Kaliningrad Oblast, Russia)
- Loxten (Lokstene, Latvia)
- Ludsen (Ludza, Latvia) - a genuine Ordensburg
- Lyck (Ełk, Poland)
- Marienburg (Alūksne, Latvia) - a genuine Ordensburg, seat of a commandery
- Marienburg (Malbork, Poland) - a genuine Ordensburg, seat of the grand master
- Marienwerder (Kwidzyn, Poland)
- Mehlsack (Pieniężno, Poland)
- Memel (Klaipėda, Lithuania) - a genuine Ordensburg
- Mewe (Gniew, Poland)
- Mohrungen (Morąg, Poland)
- Mojahn (Mujāni, Latvia)
- Narwa (Narva, Estonia) - a genuine Ordensburg, seat of a bailiff
- Neidenburg (Nidzica, Poland)
- Nessau (Nieszawa, Poland)
- Neuenburg (Jaunpils, Latvia) - a genuine Ordensburg
- Neuermühlen (Ādaži, Latvia)
- Neuhausen (Guryevsk, Kaliningrad Oblast, Russia)
- Neuhausen (Valtaiķi, Latvia)
- Neuhausen (Vastseliina, Estonia) - a bishop's castle
- Neu Kirchholm (Salaspils, Latvia)
- Neuschloß (Vasknarva, Estonia) - a genuine Ordensburg, seat of a bailiff
- Oberpahlen (Põltsamaa, Estonia) - a genuine Ordensburg, seat of bailiff
- Odenpäh (Otepää, Estonia) - a bishop's castle
- Ortelsburg (Szczytno, Poland)
- Ossiek (Osiek, Poland)
- Osterode (Ostróda, Poland)
- Padis (Padise, Estonia) - monastery
- Papau (Papowo Biskupie, Poland)
- Pernau (Pärnu, Estonia) - a genuine Ordensburg, seat of a bailiff
- Peude (Pöide, Estonia) - a genuine Ordensburg, seat of a bailiff
- Pilten (Piltene, Latvia)
- Pöddes (Kalvi, Estonia) - vassal castle
- Preußisch Holland (Pasłęk, Poland)
- Preußisch Mark (Przezmark, Poland)
- Ragnit (Neman, Kaliningrad Oblast, Russia)
- Rastenburg (Kętrzyn, Poland)
- Reval (Tallinn, Estonia) - a genuine Ordensburg, seat of a commandery
- Rheden (Radzyń Chełmiński, Poland)
- Rhein (Ryn, Poland)
- Riesenburg (Prabuty, Poland)
- Riga (Riga, Latvia) - a genuine Ordensburg, seat of the master of the Livonian Order
- Rössel (Reszel, Poland)
- Rodenpois (Ropaži, Latvia)
- Roggenhausen (Rogóźno-Zamek, Poland)
- Ronneburg (Rauna, Latvia) - a bishop's castle
- Rosenberck (Susz, Poland)
- Rositten (Rēzekne, Latvia) - a genuine Ordensburg, seat of a bailiff
- Rujen (Rūjiena, Latvia)
- Saalau (Żuława, Poland)
- Salis (Salacgrīva, Latvia) - a bishop's castle
- Schaaken (Nekrasovo, Kaliningrad Oblast, Russia)
- Schlochau (Człuchów, Poland)
- Schönberg (Skaistkalne, Latvia)
- Schönsee (Kowalewo Pomorskie, Poland)
- Schwanenburg (Gulbene, Latvia)
- Schwetz (Świecie, Poland)
- Seehesten (Szestno, Poland)
- Segewold (Sigulda, Latvia) - a genuine Ordensburg, seat of the Land Marshal
- Selburg (near modern Vecsēlpils, Latvia) - a genuine Ordensburg, seat of a bailiff
- Sesswangen (Cesvaine, Latvia)
- Smilten (Smiltene, Latvia)
- Soldau (Działdowo, Poland)
- Sonnenburg (Maasi, Estonia) - a genuine Ordensburg, seat of a bailiff
- Strasburg (Brodnica, Poland)
- Stuhm (Sztum, Poland)
- Tapiau (Gvardeysk, Kaliningrad Oblast, Russia)
- Taplaken (Talpaki, Kaliningrad Oblast, Russia)
- Tarwast (Tarvastu, Estonia) - a genuine Ordensburg
- Terweten (Tērvete, Latvia)
- Tolsburg (Toolse, Estonia) - a genuine Ordensburg, seat of a bailiff
- Thorn (Toruń, Poland) - a genuine Ordensburg, seat of a commandery
- Treyden (Turaida, Latvia) - a bishop's castle
- Trikaten (Trikāta, Latvia)
- Tuchel (Tuchola, Poland)
- Tuckum (Tukums, Latvia)
- Türpsal (Järve, Estonia) - vassal castle
- Uexküll (Ikšķile, Latvia)
- Villack (Viļaka, Latvia) - a bishop's castle
- Wack (Vao, Estonia) - vassal castle
- Waldau (Nizovye, Kaliningrad Oblast, Russia)
- Warbeck (Uue-Kastre, Estonia) - a bishop's castle
- Weißenstein (Paide, Estonia) - a genuine Ordensburg, seat of a bailiff
- Welsas (Wieldządz, Poland)
- Wenden (Cēsis, Latvia) - a genuine Ordensburg, seat of the Landmeister in Livland
- Werder (Virtsu, Estonia) - vassal castle
- Wesenberg (Rakvere, Estonia) - a genuine Ordensburg, seat of a bailiff
- Windau (Ventspils, Latvia) - a genuine Ordensburg, seat of a commander
- Wolkenburg (Volkenberga, Latvia)
- Wolmar (Valmiera, Latvia)
- Zlotterie (Złotoria, Poland)

== See also ==
- NS-Ordensburgen
- List of castles in Estonia
- List of castles in Latvia
- List of castles in Lithuania
- List of castles in Poland
