= Nekrasovo =

Nekrasovo may refer to the following places in Russia:

- Nekrasovo, Ozyorsky District, Kaliningrad Oblast
- Nekrasovo, Polessky District, Kaliningrad Oblast
- Nekrasovo, Perm Krai
- Nekrasovo, Vladimir Oblast
- Nekrasovo, Cherepovetsky District, Vologda Oblast
- Nekrasovo, Sokolsky District, Vologda Oblast
- Nekrasovo, Vologodsky District, Vologda Oblast
