= List of castles in Latvia =

This is the List of castles in Latvia, which includes fortified residences of Western European conquerors built in the area of present-day Latvia before the 17th century. There are about 140 medieval castles in the area, therefore this list is not complete. After the name of the castle comes the year of construction and a short description of its present-day condition.

== Table of contents ==
=== Courland ===
Name	Town	Districts	Established	Status	Notes	Refs
Aizpute Castle	Aizpute	South Kurzeme	End of the 13th century	Ruins		
Alsunga Castle	Alsunga	Kuldīga	Before 1341	Preserved	In use	
Dundaga Castle	Dundaga	Talsi	Late 13th century	Preserved	In use	
Ēdole Castle	Ēdole	Kuldīga	From 1264 to 1267	Preserved	In use	
Embūte Castle	Embūte	South Kurzeme	Around 1265	Ruins	Walls stand up to 7 meters high	
Grobiņa Castle	Grobiņa	South Kurzeme	1253	Ruins	A wooden castle before 1265	
Nurmuiža Castle	Lauciene	Talsi	Around 1598	Preserved	Under reconstruction	
Piltene Castle	Piltene	Ventspils	End of the 13th century	Ruins		
Ventspils Castle	Ventspils	Ventspils city	Before 1290	Preserved	In use	

=== Zemgale ===
Name	Town	Parish	Established	Status	Notes	Refs
Bauska Castle	Bauska	Bauska	Built after 1443	Under reconstruction	Medieval part in ruins and Renaissance part reconstructed	
Dobele Castle	Dobele	Dobele	From 1335 to 1359	Impressive ruins		
Jaunpils Castle	Jaunpils	Tukums	1301	Preserved	In use	
Rundāle Palace	Pilsrundāle	Bauska	1768, museum opened in 1963	Preserved	In use	
Šlokenbeka Castle	Milzkalne	Tukums	Built before 1544	Preserved and transformed	In use	

=== Vidzeme ===
Name	Town	Parish	Established	Status	Notes	Refs
Aizkraukle Castle	Aizkraukle	Aizkraukle	Second half of the 14th century	Ruins	Walls standing up to 5 meters high	
Alūksne Castle	Alūksne	Alūksne	Around 1342	Ruins	Walls higher than 5 meters high	
Burtnieki Castle	Burtnieki	Valmiera	Built before 1366	Ruins	Walls up to 4 meters high	
Cēsis Castle	Cēsis	Cēsis	Around 1213-1218	Impressive ruins		
Daugavgrīva Castle	Daugavgrīva	Rīga	1208	Only earthen ramparts		
Gaujiena Castle	Gaujiena	Smiltene	Around 1236-1238	Ruins	Walls standing higher than 10 meters	
Koknese Castle	Koknese	Aizkraukle	Around 1210	Impressive ruins		
Krimulda Castle	Krimulda	Sigulda	Middle of the 13th century	Ruins		
Lielstraupe Castle	Straupe	Cēsis	End of the 13th century	Preserved	In use	
Lielvārde Castle	Lielvārde	Ogre	Built before 1248	Ruins		
Uldevena wooden castle	Lielvārde	Ogre	Built before 1213	Reconstructed		
Rauna Castle	Rauna	Rauna	Built before 1381	Impressive ruins		
Riga Castle	Riga	Rīga	Built in the 1340s	Preserved	In use	
Salacgrīva fortress	Salacgrīva	Limbaži	Built in 1226	Ruins	Barely visible	
Sigulda Medieval Castle	Sigulda	Sigulda	From 1207 to 1209	Impressive ruins		
Turaida Castle	Turaida	Sigulda	Built in 1214	Partly reconstructed		
Vecdole Castle	Dole island	Salaspils	Built before 1226	Ruins	Barely visible	
Vecpiebalga Castle	Vecpiebalga	Cēsis	Built before 1318	Ruins	Walls standing up to 6 metres high	

=== Latgale ===
Name	Town	Parish	Established	Status	Notes	Refs
Dinaburga Castle	East of Daugavpils	Augšdaugava	Around 1273-1277	Excavated and exposed ruins		
Krustpils Castle	Jēkabpils	Jēkabpils	Second half of the 13th century	Preserved	In use	
Ludza Castle	Ludza	Ludza	Built in the 14th century	Impressive ruins		
Viļaka Castle	Viļaka	Balvi	End of the 15th century	Ruins	Stone castle after 1516	
Rēzekne Castle	Rēzekne	Rēzekne	Built before 1324	Ruins		

== See also ==
- List of castles
- List of castles in Estonia
- List of palaces and manor houses in Estonia
- List of palaces and manor houses in Latvia
- List of hillforts in Latvia
- List of castles in Lithuania

== Additional information ==
=== Sources ===
- Zarāns, Alberts (2006). Latvijas pilis un muižas. Castles and manors of Latvia (in Latvian and English). Riga. ISBN 9984-785-05-X. OCLC 72358861.
- Ose, I. (2004). Latvijas 12. gadsimta beigu - 17. gadsimta vācu piļu leksikons (in Latvian). Riga.
