= Piltene Castle =

Castle in Latvia

- Piltene, Courland, Latvia
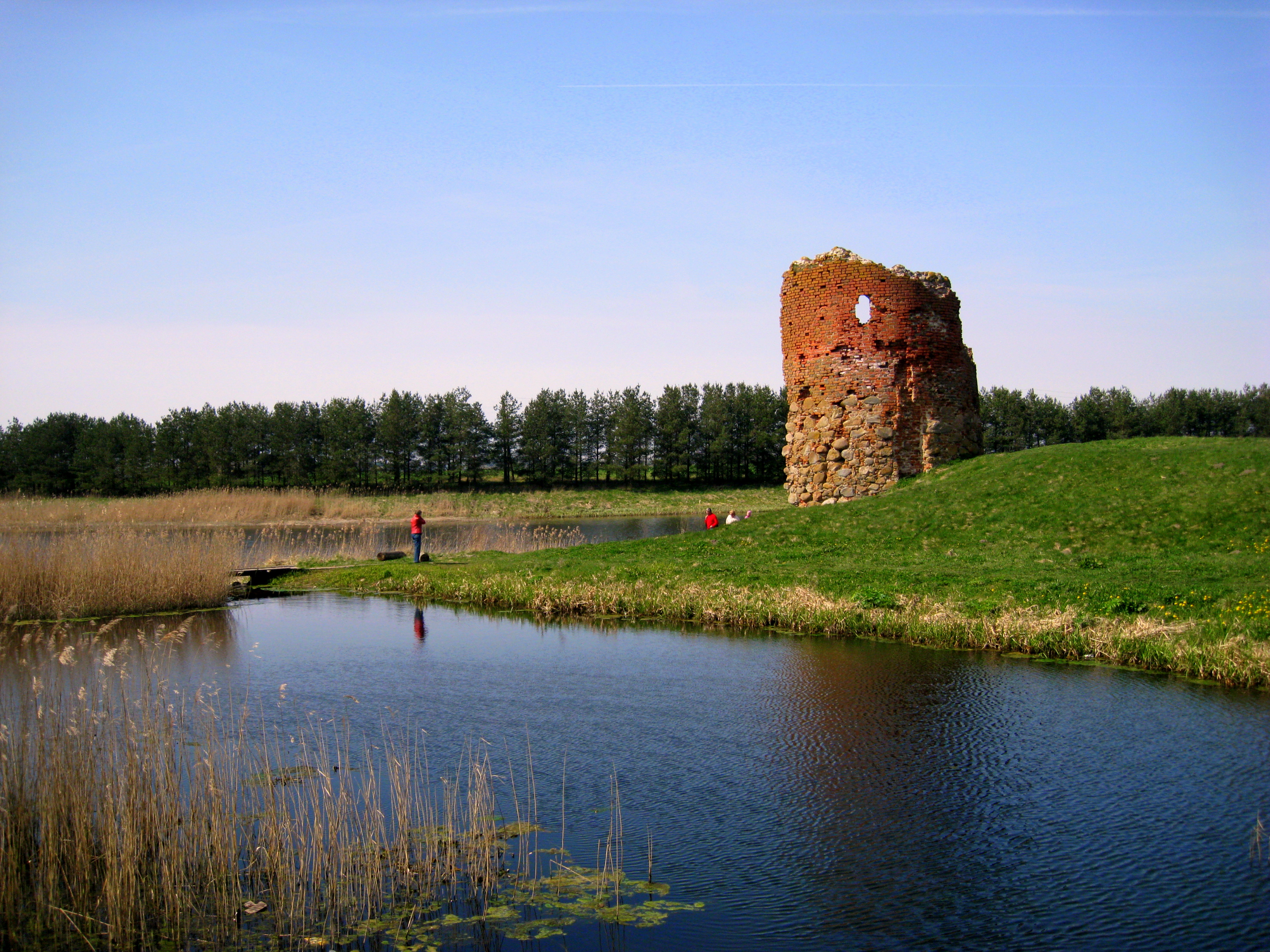

Site information
- Type: Castle
- Condition: Ruins

Location
- Coordinates: 57°13′21″N 21°40′00″E

Site history
- Built: End of the 13th century

Piltene Castle is a Bishopric of Courland castle in the town of Piltene in the historical region of Courland, in western Latvia. Until the 16th century it served as a capital of Bishopric of Courland.

== History ==
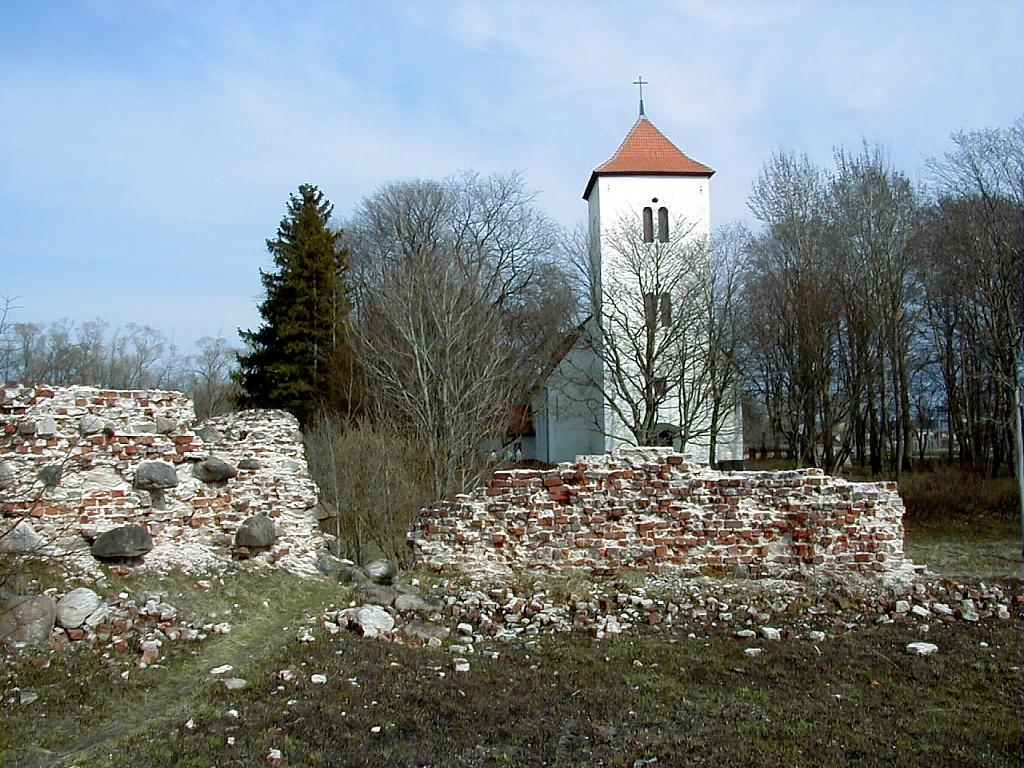
Remains of the Wall in front of the Pilten Church

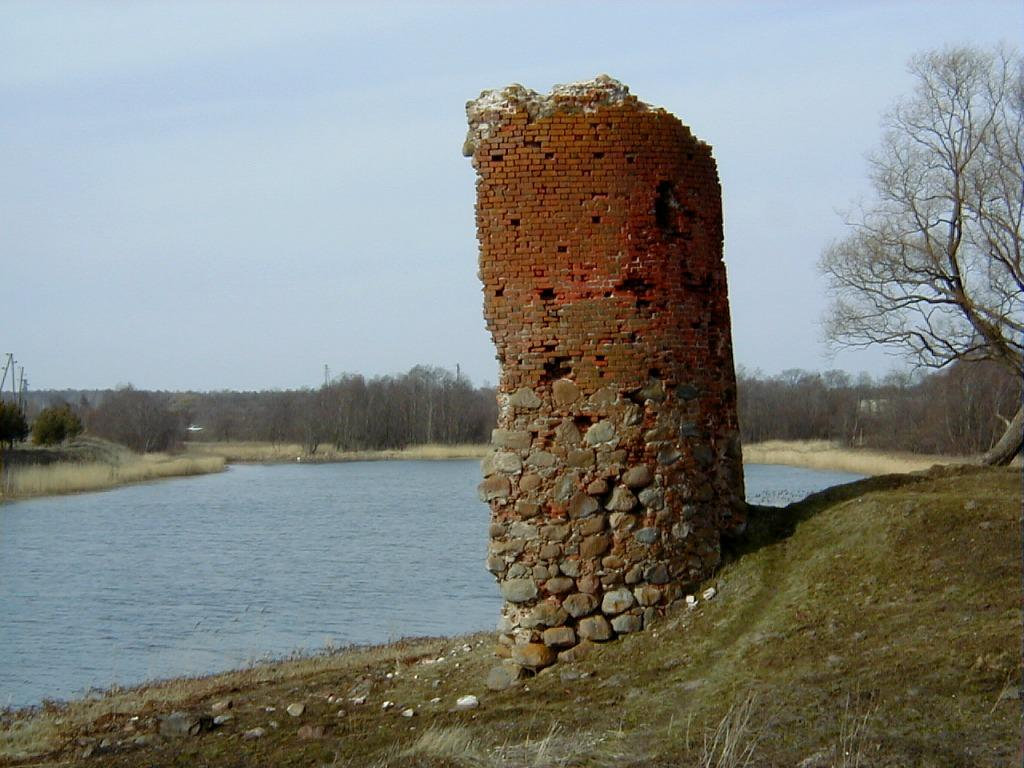
The tiny tower of the castle known as Schmachturm or Shame Tower due to numerous human remains found on it grounds.

As part of the Northern crusades, the region was awarded the Livonian Brothers of the Sword in 1230 in the first Treaty with Curonian King. Between 1242 and 1247, the region was again subjugated by the Teutonic Order into which the Order of the Sword Brothers had merged after the defeat at the Battle of Saule. The eternal peace was established only in 1267, when master of the order Otto von Lutterberg pacified the region and concluded treaty with the Curonians.

At the division of Courland the Order received the area on the left bank of Venta (Windau) river and the diocese of Courland the area on the left bank with Pilten. Bishop Edmund von Werd (1263 to 1299) resided in Memel castle, while Amboten castle served him as a residence in northern Kurland. Castle Amboten was left during a temporary absence of the bishop in 1290 the Order of National Defense. Pilten Castle was probably built only after this time, possibly Pilten Castle was built as the new seat of the bishop, the bishop's chancery and the penman under Emund's successor, Bishop Burchard (1300-1311).

The castle itself was first documented in 1309, when the bishop of Kurland was forced to leave his land and fortresses for the rest of his life and leave the country.

During the Livonian War the last bishop of Kurland, Johann von Münchhausen, Pilten and the whole monastery 1559 sold to the King of Denmark, who gave it to his brother, Duke Magnus of Holstein, who was appointed King of Livonia by Tsar Ivan the Terrible. After a contract of subjugation between the King of Poland and Duke Gotthard Kettler of November 1561, the monastery of Pilten was to reach the Duchy even then. However, the congregations did not want to submit to either Poland or the Kurland dependent on it, but asked King Frederick II of Denmark to protect the monastery. The big tower of the castle was blown up so that it would not serve the Poles as a target during a siege. In the spring of 1583 there was a fierce petty war between Poland and the monastery, with Amboten castle and Neuhausen (Valtaiki) occupied by Poland, while Pilten remained in the hands of the monks. Magnus died on 18 March 1583 at Pilten Castle. The pen was to fall to Poland, which had to pay distance money to the King of Denmark. Since Poland did not have the required sum, Georg Friedrich von Ansbach, the regent of the Duchy of Prussia, paid the money to Denmark and became pledge holder of the abbey with all rights sovereignty.

In 1617, the bishopric of Courland came under the rule of the Polish–Lithuanian Commonwealth, and Castle Hasenpoth became the administrative center. For 1621 is mentioned that the castle Pilten was partially collapsed.

In 1710 during the flood Venta river made a shortcut over the riverbank and the old riverbed has been clogged. As a result the fortress ended up 1.5 km away from the river waterways which in turn lead to declining trade.

By the 1750s the old fortress fell completely out of use and depopulated. In the eighteenth century, the entire region suffered from hostilities between Poles, Swedes and Russians, and local commercial life and economic activity died out completely.

== Archaeological excavations ==
In 1976 - 1977, Latvian archaeologist Ēvalds Mugurēvičs conducted excavations in the area of Piltene Castle, which revealed fragments of the castle grounds, a ditch and a bridge.

== Current status ==
Some of the fragments of both rounded cannon towers and the few low walls of the convent building have been preserved. About half of the tower's height of 6 m has been preserved from a small round tower. There is also a southern moat in the Venta river valley. One hundred meters east of the fortress is Lutheran Piltene parish church.

== See also ==
- List of castles in Latvia
