= Nurmuiža Castle =

Castle in Latvia

- Lauciene parish, Courland in Latvia
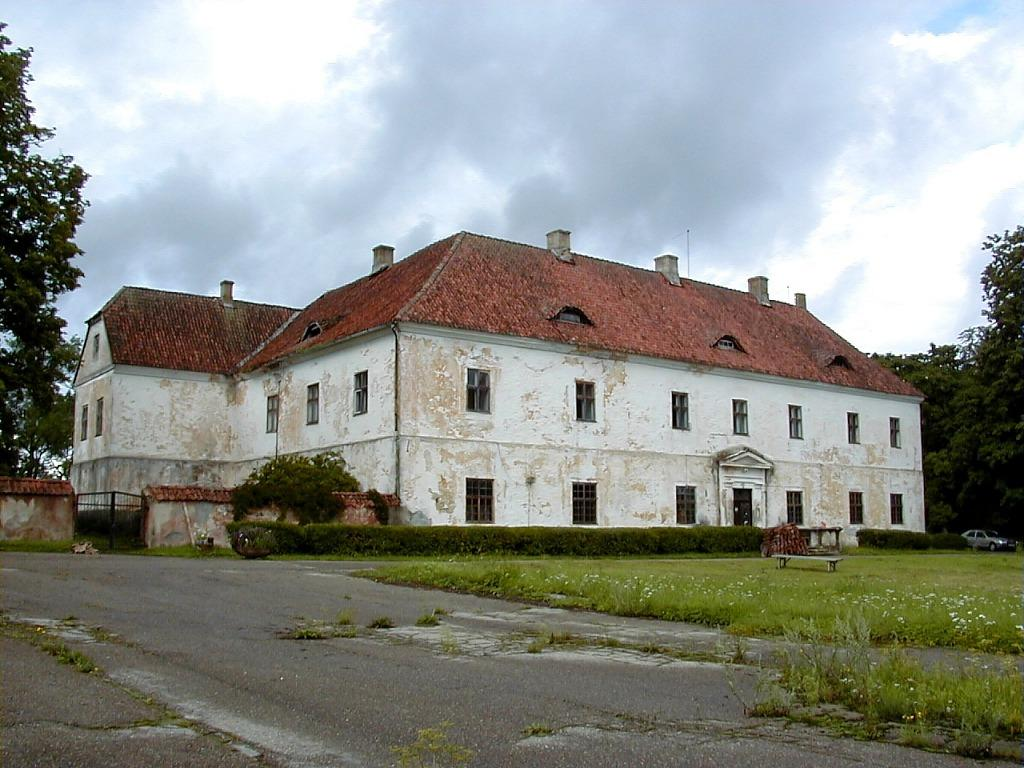

Site information
- Type: Castle

Location
- Shown within Latvia
- Coordinates: 57°13′37″N 22°45′40″E

Site history
- Built: late 16 century

Nurmuiža Castle is a castle in the Lauciene Parish of Talsi Municipality in the Courland region of Latvia.

== Today's use ==
Since 2004 the castle has been managed by "Nurmuižas pils" Ltd. and is once again in private ownership by Oļegs Fiļs.

== See also ==
- List of castles in Latvia
