= Salacgrīva fortress =

Castle in Latvia

- Salacgrīva, Vidzeme, Latvia
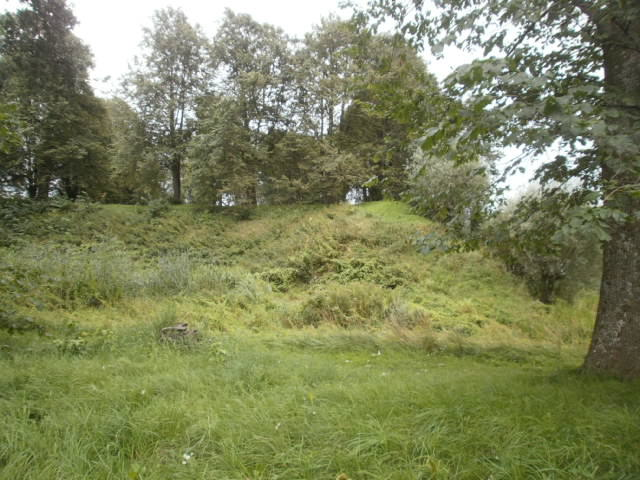
- West bastion of the Salacgrīva fortress

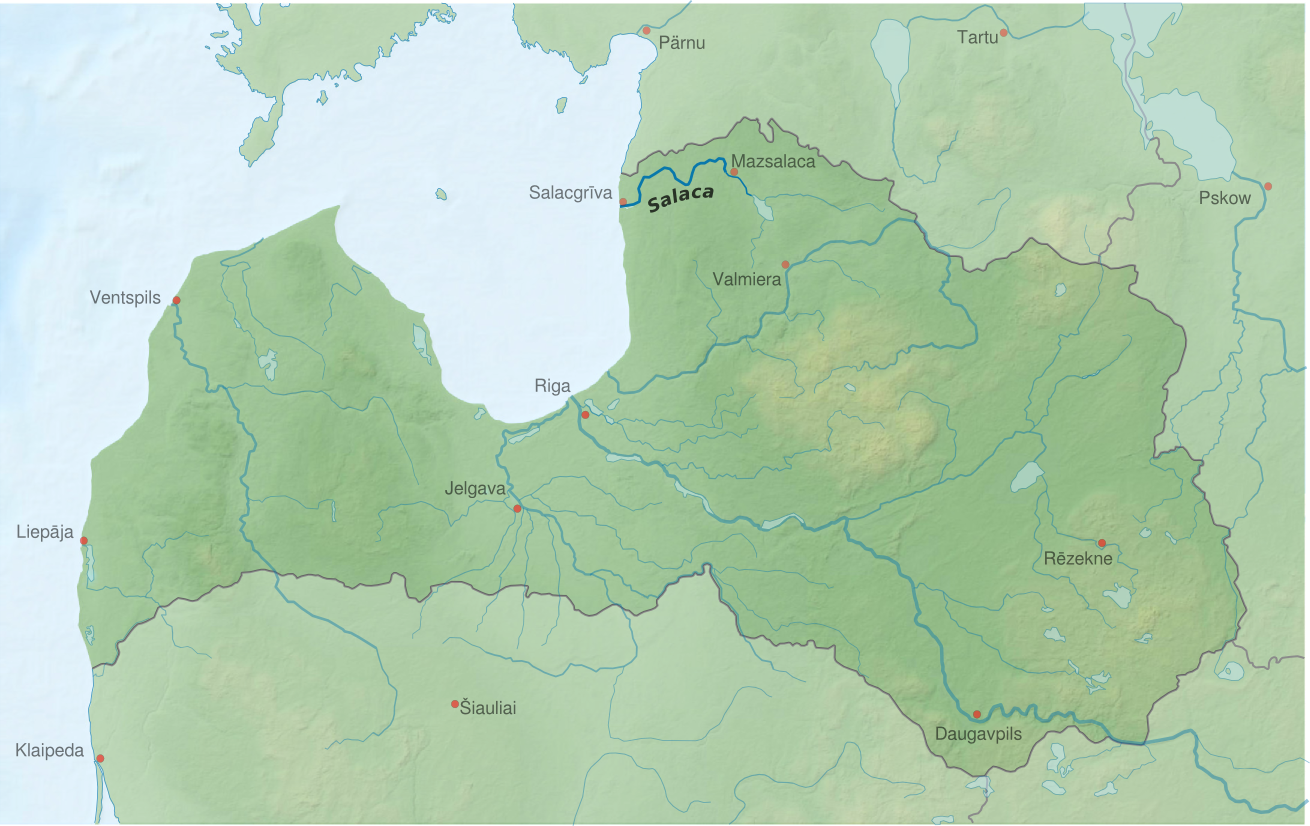
- Map showing the location of the Salacgrīva fortress at the mouth of the Salaca river.

Site information
- Type: Fortress
- Condition: Ruins

Location
- Coordinates: 57°45′16″N 24°21′49″E

Site history
- Built: 1226
- Built by: Archbishop of Riga
- Demolished: 1702–1704

Salacgrīva fortress was a medieval castle located on the right bank of the Salaca river, in the historical region of Vidzeme, northern Latvia. Built in 1226 by the bishopric of Riga, it served as an outpost to control access to the port of Salaca. It was heavily damaged by Russian, Tartars, Polish and the Swedish troops during the Northern Wars. The word 'Salacgrīva' means 'Mouth (estuary) of Salaca'.

== History ==
In 1226, Albert of Riga had the three-tower castle Salis or Salismünde built about half a kilometer from the river mouth, which served as a powerful fortress to monitor access to the port of Salaca. Captured in 1391 and burned in 1564, it was drastically damaged in 1575 by Russian and Tartar warriors who fought side by side with the troops of Duke Magnus of Holstein.

In 1581, it was attacked by the Swedish troops of Commander Thomas von Enden, and during the Second Northern War it was almost destroyed. Between 1702 and 1704, it was finally demolished, and since then there have been no restoration works carried out there.

== See also ==
- List of castles in Latvia
