= Nekrasovo, Sokolsky District, Vologda Oblast =

Nekrasovo Некрасово
- Village
- Location within Vologda Oblast Location within Russia
- Coordinates: 59°35′N 40°53′E
- Country: Russia
- Region: Vologda Oblast
- District: Sokolsky District
- Time zone: UTC+3:00

Nekrasovo (Russian: Некрасово) is a rural locality (a village) in Vorobyovskoye Rural Settlement, Sokolsky District, Vologda Oblast, Russia. The population was 11 as of 2002.

== Geography ==
Nekrasovo is situated 72 km northeast of Sokol, the district's administrative center, by road. Kosikovo is the nearest village.
