= Nekrasovo, Vologodsky District, Vologda Oblast =

Nekrasovo Некрасово
- Village
- Location within Vologda Oblast Location within Russia
- Coordinates: 59°29′N 39°14′E
- Country: Russia
- Region: Vologda Oblast
- District: Vologodsky District
- Time zone: UTC+3:00

Nekrasovo (Russian: Некрасово) is a rural locality (a village) in Kubenskoye Rural Settlement, Vologodsky District, Vologda Oblast, Russia. The population was 12 as of 2002.

== Geography ==
Nekrasovo is located 59 km northwest of Vologda (the district's administrative centre) by road. Dor is the nearest rural locality.
