= Burtnieki Castle =

Castle in Latvia

Coordinates: 57.6985°N 25.2787°E

- Vidzeme, Latvia
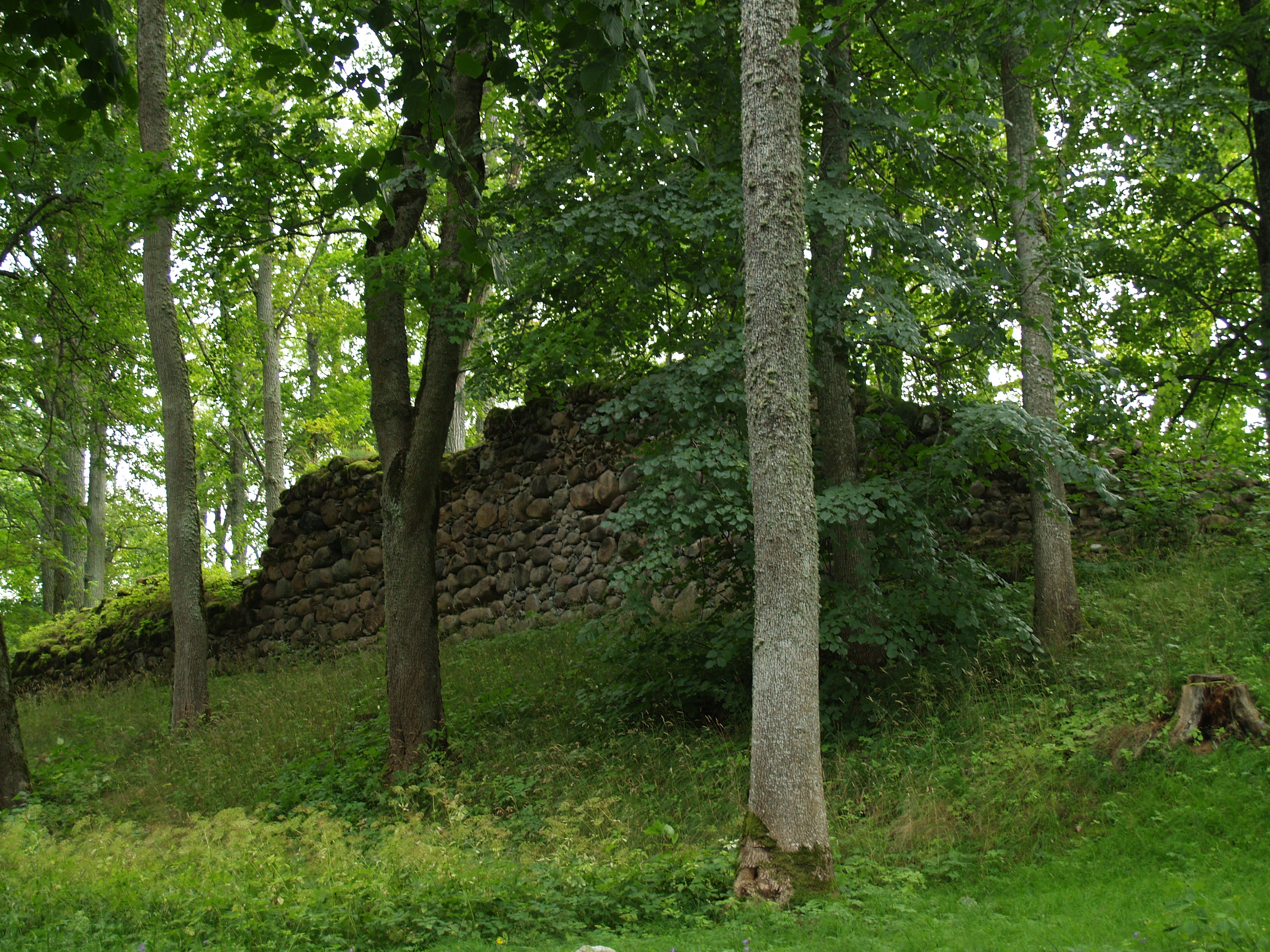

Site information
- Type: Castle
- Condition: Ruins

Burtnieki Castle (German: Burg Burtneck; Estonian: Asti ordulinnus) is a castle in Burtnieki Parish, Valmiera Municipality in the Vidzeme region of Latvia. It was built on the south shore of Lake Burtnieks for the Livonian Order around 1284.

The construction of the Burtnieki Medieval Castle was initiated around 1284 by Livonian Order Master Wilhelm von Schauerburg.

The original Burtnieki Castle lies in ruins, with walls reaching up to 4 meters high. [O]nly about 100 meters of the eastern curtain wall remain, unprotected and gradually deteriorating.

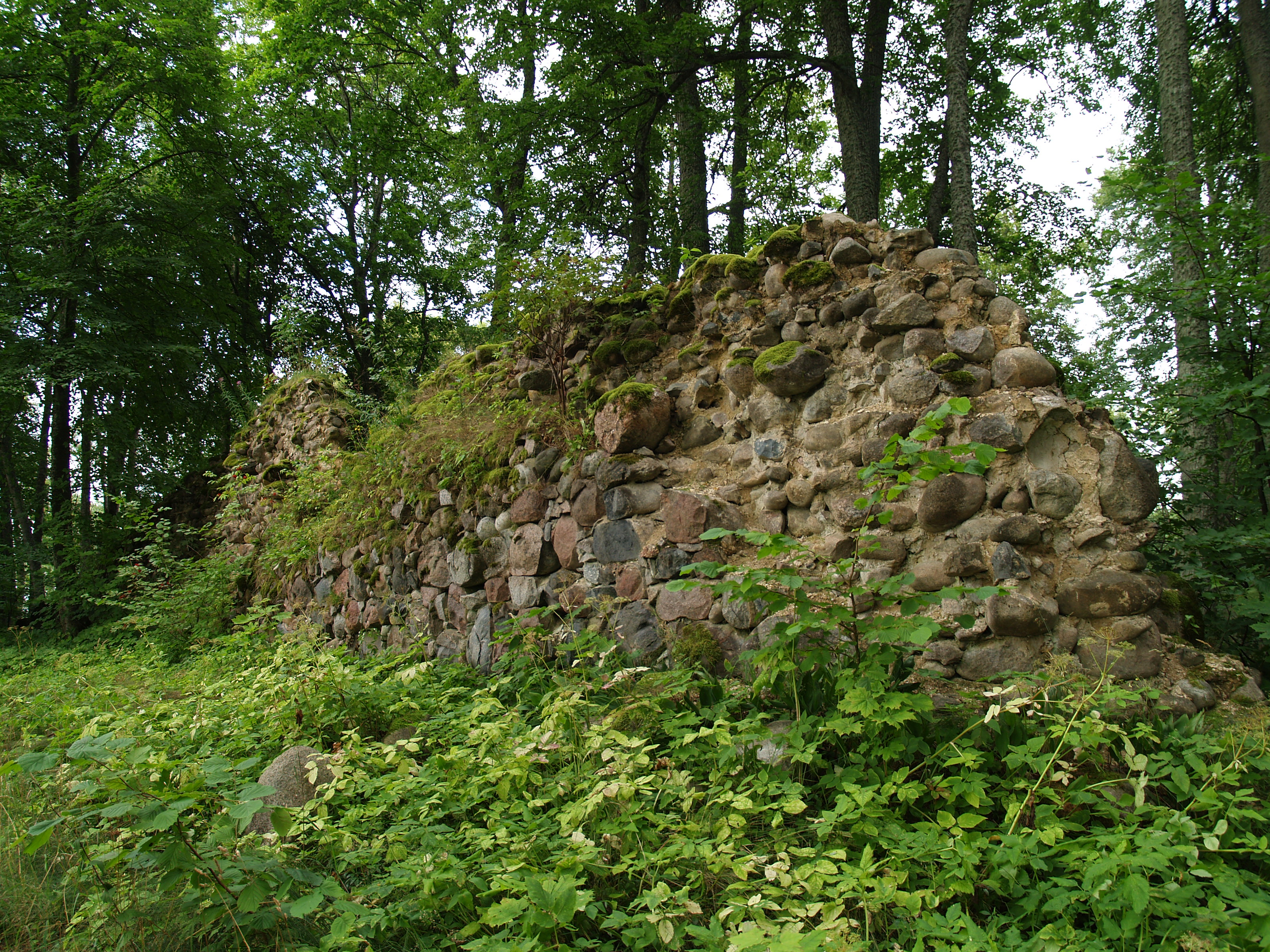

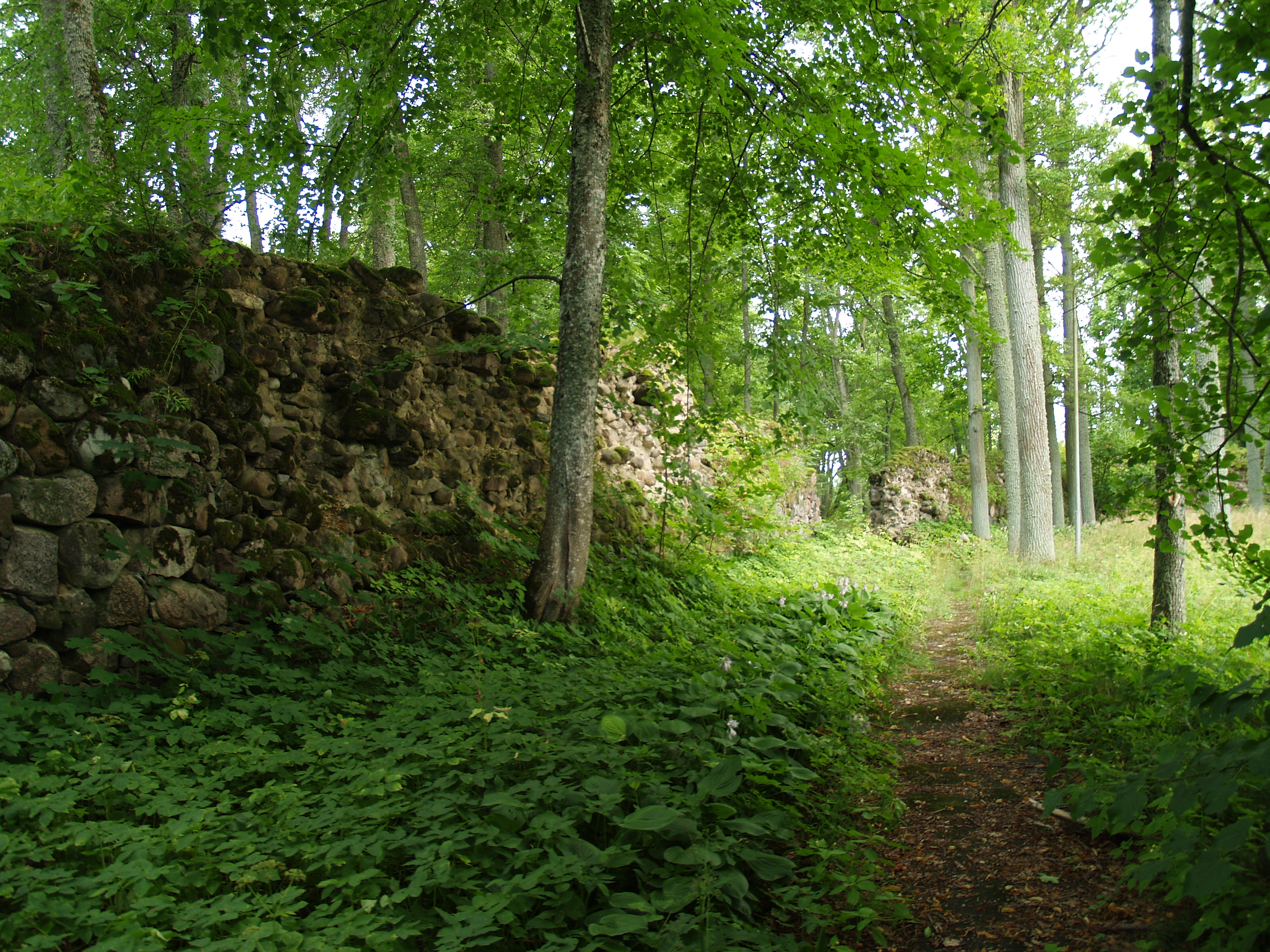

== See also ==
- List of castles in Latvia
