= Dobele Castle =

Castle in Latvia

- Semigallia, Latvia
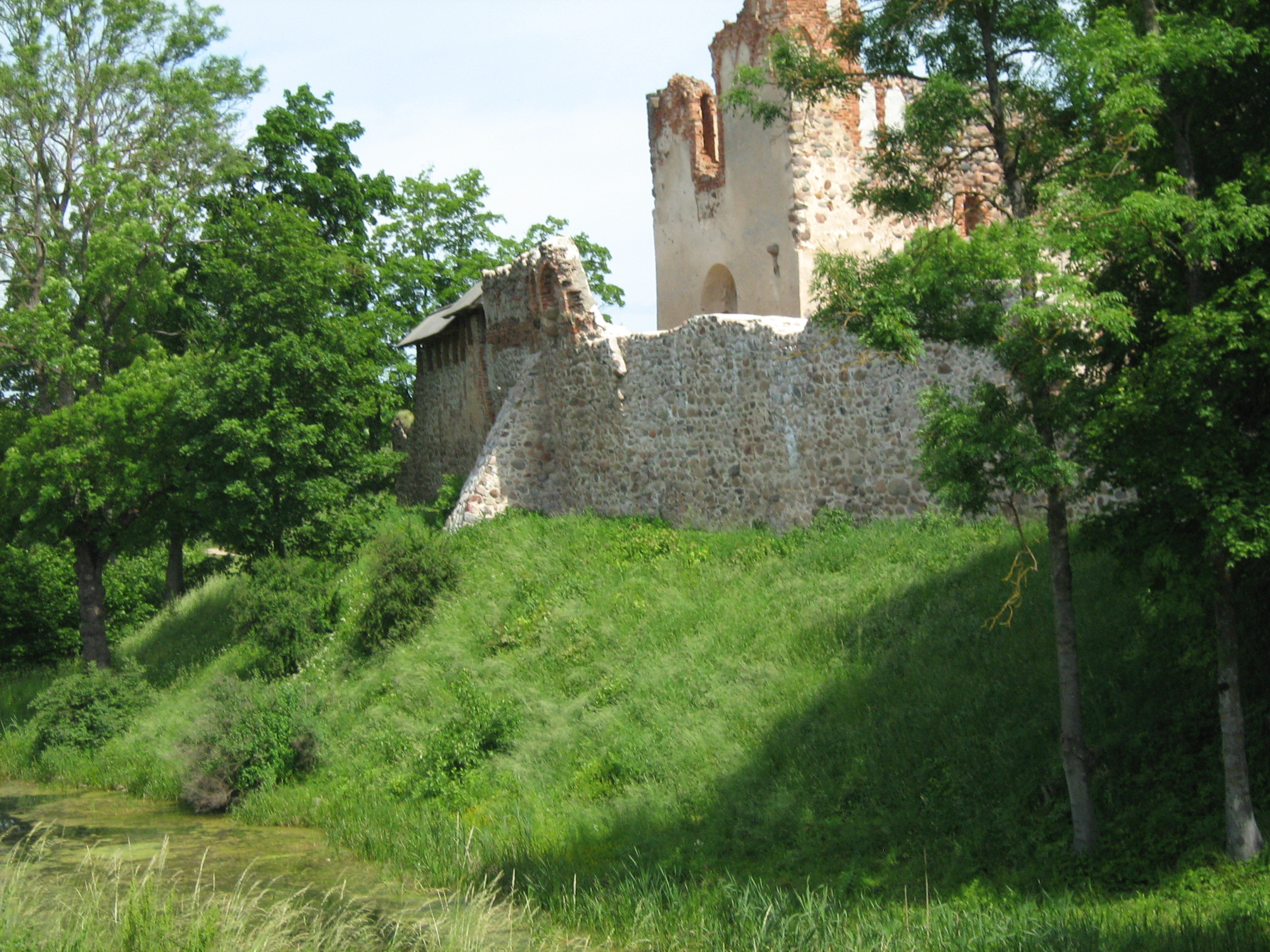

Site information
- Type: Castle
- Condition: Ruins

Location
- Coordinates: 56.622171°N 23.272757°E

Site history
- Built: 1335-1339
- Built by: Livonian Order
- Materials: Brick, boulders

Dobele Castle (Latvian: Dobeles pils, German: Ordensburg Doblen) is a castle in the town of Dobele in the Semigallia region of Latvia. The Livonian order built the castle on the west bank of the Berze river in 1335, on the site of an old hillfort.

== History ==
The area surrounding Dobele Castle was inhabited by the Semigallians prior to and during the Livonian Crusade. A hillfort at the site served as the administrative center of Dobele County and provided protection for the settlement. The location was first mentioned in written records in 1254.

Throughout the Livonian Crusade, multiple battles took place at the hillfort. It endured six sieges by the Livonian Order, although the fort was never captured. In 1279, a crusader force from Kuldīga, supported by allied Curonians, attempted to conquer the fort but failed. In the winter of 1280 to 1281, a Livonian army under Master Konrad von Feuchtwangen launched another unsuccessful assault. In the winter of 1288 to 1289, a large crusader army, including allied Estonians and Latgalians and led by Master Kuno von Hazzingenstein, attacked Dobele. They pillaged and burned the town but were again unable to seize the fortress. In 1289, after prolonged scorched-earth tactics and widespread famine, the remaining Semigallians burned their own fort and migrated to the Grand Duchy of Lithuania. Dobele hillfort was one of the last remaining Semigallian strongholds in the territory of present-day Latvia.

Several decades later, the Livonian Order constructed a stone castle on the same site between 1335 and 1347. A small settlement of craftsmen and merchants formed around the new structure. Until 1562, the castle served as the seat of the Dobele komtur (commander). During the 16th and 17th centuries, several regional assemblies, or Landtage, were held at the castle.

In 1621 and 1625, the castle was briefly occupied by Swedish forces under King Gustav II Adolf. From 1643 to 1649, the castle served as the residence of Elisabeth Magdalena of Pomerania, the widow of the Duke of Courland. She lived there with her foster son, the future duke Jacob Kettler. During the Polish–Swedish wars, the castle was again taken by Swedish forces in 1658. Following the war, Duke Jacob Kettler ordered partial restoration of the castle.

In 1701, during the Great Northern War, the castle was once again occupied by Swedish troops. King Charles XII of Sweden stayed at Dobele Castle for six days. The structure was heavily damaged during the war and was never rebuilt. It was officially abandoned in 1736 and gradually fell into ruin.

In 1915, German Emperor Wilhelm II visited the hill near the castle ruins during an inspection of German Imperial Army units in the area.

== See also ==
- List of castles in Latvia
