= Lauciene Parish =

Parish of Latvia

- parish of Latvia
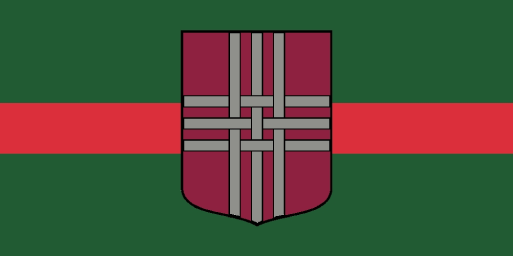
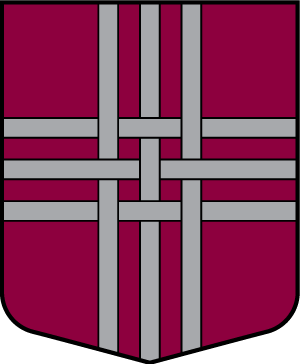
- Flag Coat of arms

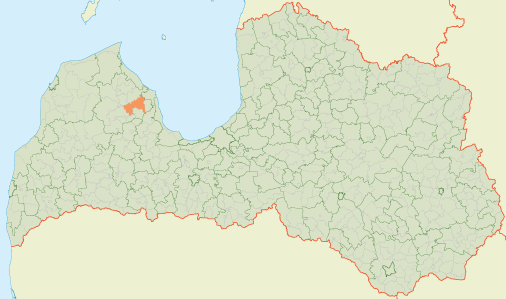
- 57°14′38″N 22°49′48″E

- Location within Latvia
- Country: Latvia

Area
  - Total: 180.36 km^{2} (69.64 sq mi)
  - Land: 175.65 km^{2} (67.82 sq mi)
  - Water: 4.71 km^{2} (1.82 sq mi)

Population (1 January 2026)
  - Total: 1,500
  - Density: 8.5/km^{2} (22/sq mi)
- Website: www.lauciene.lv

Lauciene parish (Latvian: Laucienes pagasts) is an administrative unit of Talsi Municipality in the Courland region of Latvia.

== See also ==
- Nurmuiža Castle
