= Viļaka Castle =

Castle in Latvia

- Viļakas pils
- Viļaka
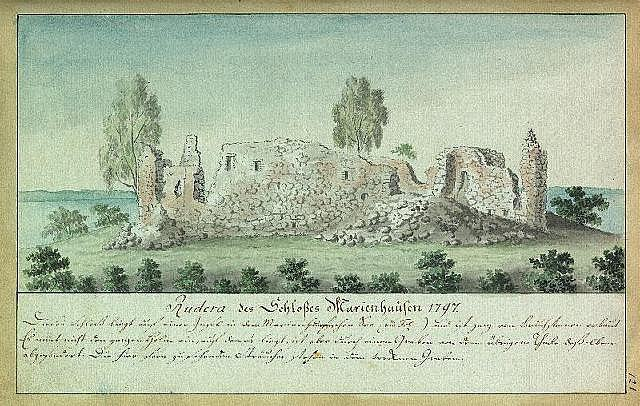
- Viļaka Castle ruins in 1797

Site information
- Type: Castle
- Owner: Balvi Municipality
- Open to the public: Yes
- Condition: Ruins

Location
- Coordinates: 57°11′38.52″N 27°41′22.48″E

Site history
- Built: After 1516
- Built by: Archbishopric of Riga
- Materials: Stone
- Demolished: Early 18th century

Viļaka Castle (Latvian: Viļakas pilsdrupas, Mariensee Castle, Marienhausen, Villack) is a ruined castle in Balvi Municipality in the Latgale region of Latvia. The castle is located close to the town of Viļaka, on the only (unnamed) island in Viļaka Lake.

The island on which the castle was built was donated in 1293 by the Archbishop of Riga, Johann II von Vecht, to the Cistercian monks, in order to build a monastery there. It was named Marienhausen, or the House of Mary. At that time, it was a place very far to the east from other Crusader centers, surrounded by swamps, far from the main communication routes, inaccessible. The buildings erected by the Cistercians were probably mostly wooden, although they could have funded one stone tower. The stone castle built by the Archbishopric of Riga in 1342 as a wooden castle, rebuilt as a stone castle after 1516. The castle was destroyed in 1702 during the Great Northern War. The outer walls are 1.6m thick, remaining fragments of the walls are up to 2 meters high.

In 2020, a pontoon bridge between the island and the mainland and a walking path on the island were unveiled. The island trail is more than 400 meters in length. A scale model of the original castle is on display next to the bridge. An additional option to visit the island is by renting a SUP board (paddleboard).

== See also ==
- List of castles in Latvia

== Sources ==
- Zarāns, Alberts (2006). Latvijas pilis un muižas. Castles and manors of Latvia (in Latvian and English). Riga. ISBN 9984-785-05-X. OCLC 72358861.
- Krahe, Friedrich-Wilhelm (2000). Burgen des deutschen Mittelalters. Grundriss-Lexikon (in German). Flechsig. ISBN 3-88189-360-1.
