= Salacgrīva =

Town in Limbaži Municipality, Latvia

- Town
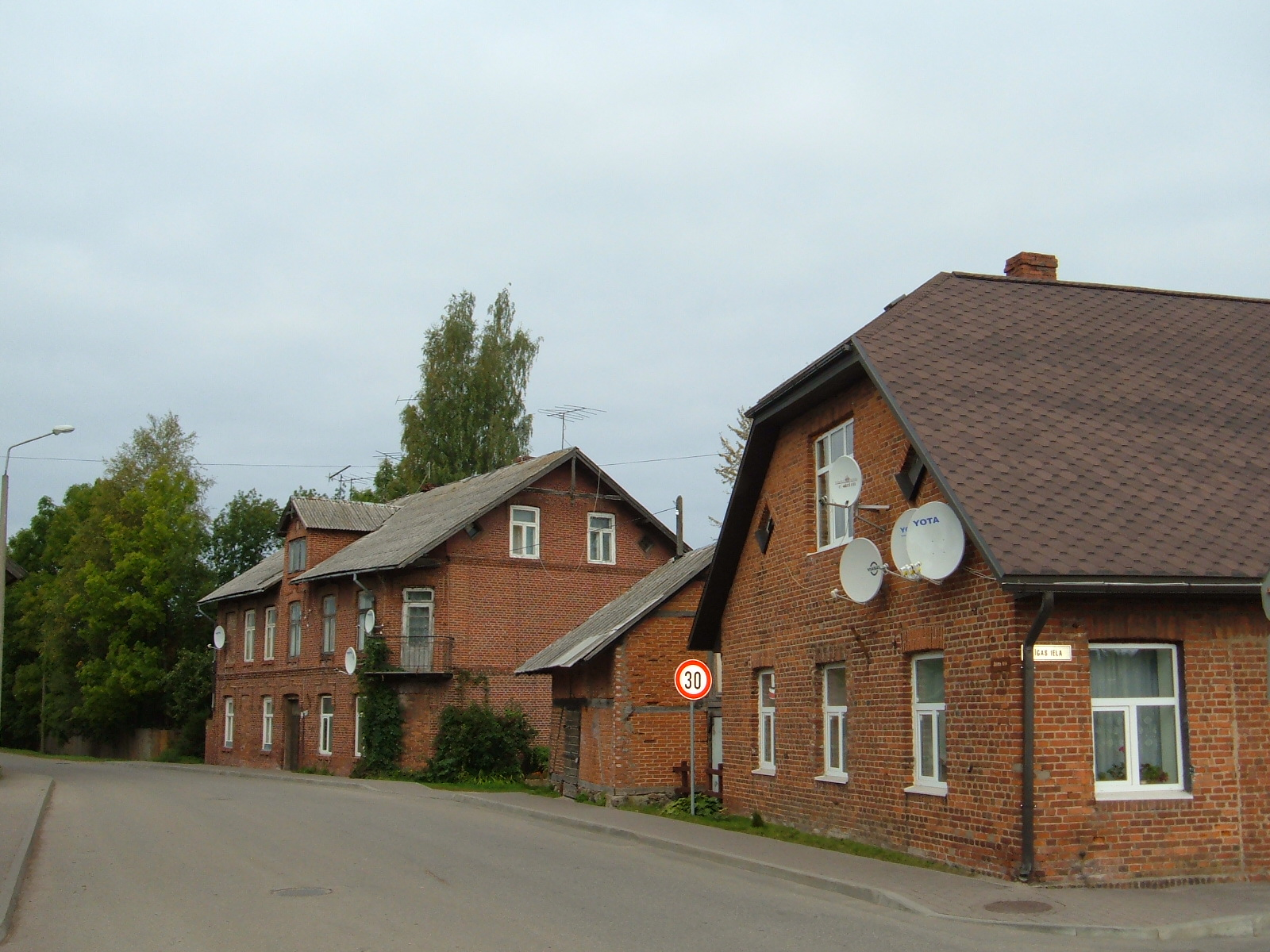
- Street in Salacgrīva

- Flag Coat of arms
- Interactive map of Salacgrīva
- Location in Latvia
- Coordinates: 57°45′N 24°21′E
- Country: Latvia
- Municipality: Limbaži Municipality
- Town rights: 1928

Government
  - Mayor: Sigita Upmale

Area
  - Total: 13.19 km^{2} (5.09 sq mi)
  - Land: 12.38 km^{2} (4.78 sq mi)
  - Water: 0.81 km^{2} (0.31 sq mi)
  - Rural territory: 312.83 km^{2} (120.78 sq mi)

Population (2026)
  - Total: 2,435
  - Density: 196.7/km^{2} (509.4/sq mi)
- Time zone: UTC+2 (EET)
  - Summer (DST): UTC+3 (EEST)
- Postal code: LV-403(2-4)
- Calling code: +371 640
- Number of city council members: 15

Salacgrīva (pronounced [ˈsaɫɐt͡sˌgriːvɐ]; German: Salismünde) is a town in Limbaži Municipality in the Vidzeme region of Latvia. The centre of the area surrounding Salacgrīva is the mouth of Salaca River, and the town's name literally means "Mouth of Salaca" in Latvian. Since 2007, it is famous for hosting Positivus Festival every July for 3 days attracting thousands of tourists.

The distance from Salacgrīva to the capital of Latvia - Riga is 103 km, to Limbaži – 50 km, to Valmiera – 95 km, to Tallinn – 206 km. Export of timber, wood-working industry, food production and trade are the most important factors in the economy of Salacgrīva.

== History ==
The first time Salacgrīva was known as a locality in the early 5th century, when Livonians created their settlement of Saletsa near the mouth of Salaca River. Several centuries later the knight's castle was built in honor of Bishop Albert of Riga on the right bank of Salaca River. It was attacked several times during the Livonian war, and for this reason by the end of the 17th century the castle had been severely damaged and it subsequently collapsed. The canal where the vessels sailed around the castle mound can still be seen in Salacgrīva. The Livonians continued to live in the region up until the mid 19th century when the Salaca Livonian dialect died out.

The evolution of Salacgrīva went hand in hand with the development of coastal shipping in the Gulf of Riga. To improve the accessibility for larger vessels, the riverbed of Salaca was deepened and a pier of boulders was built in the mouth of the river. Salacgrīva became an important transhipment point for the production of Northern Vidzeme – timber, linen, different crops – for it to be transported to Pärnu and Riga. Around this time, about 200 vessels entered the port, consequently promoting growth of the town and increase in the number of its inhabitants. Therefore, by the end of the 19th century there were more than 70 residential buildings and 40 warehouses. At the beginning of the 20th century, the flow of goods to Salacgrīva decreased, due to the rail infrastructure that was developed in Vidzeme and the fact that the majority of products was transported through the newly built port in Ainaži, which had a directly connection to the railway.

After the declaration of independence in Latvia in the beginning of the 20th century, the social life in Salacgrīva bloomed. With the initiative from H.Eidmanis in 1921, the first secondary school was established in Salacgrīva. On 7 February 1928, Salacgrīva gained a status of a town. Changes in economic life took place under the Soviet rule, when a fish processing plant, whose construction was initially intended for Ainaži, was built in Salacgrīva and the fishing artel "Brīvais vilnis" was established in Salacgrīva. Due to evolution of fishing industry, the port was renovated and an open-air stage was built to celebrate the well-known festival - fisherman's Day (named Sea festival from 2001).

Today, Salacgrīva is a growing provincial town of Latvia. Even today the export of timber, wood-working industry, food production and trade has a huge importance in the economic life of Salacgrīva.

== Transportation ==
Salacgrīva location on the A1 road (Latvia), part of Via Baltica international highway favors transit and transport industries.

== Tourism ==
After restoration of Latvian independence Salacgrīva municipality Tourism Information Centre was the first tourism information center in Latvia. It started its work on 21 June 1993, but was officially founded in 1994, on November 3. Over the years the tourism center continues to provide travelers with helpful tips for their adventure in Salacgrīva so that they would want to return again and again.

Top 5 countries from which foreign tourists arrive in Salacgrīva are Estonia, Germany, Finland, Lithuania and Russia.

Most popular tourist attractions:

- Positivus Festival - an annual, three-day summer music and culture festival playing a variety of genres, including indie, pop, folk, electronic and more styles in between. Positivus Festival has been awarded the title "Best European Festival" and is mentioned in many shortlists as one of the top music festivals to visit in Europe. Since 2022, it has been relocated to Riga.
- Lamprey weirs - unique fishing technique with a history of many centuries, which nowadays is used only Salacgrīva. Lamprey weir is a special design footbridge. Every year before the season the weirs are built from scratch, using spruce timber that has been prepared several years earlier. To hold the construction together the fishermen does not use nails or screws but specific tiebacks.
- The Treasury - a place where you can see a variety of magazines, books, toys, tableware and interior items from the Soviet period as well as audio, video and camera equipment from the first models.
- The Museum of Salacgrīva - able to view the permanent exhibition "Zutiņš murdā" (Lamprey in the fish pot) showing the fishing history and traditions in Vidzeme seaside, as well as ancient lamprey fishing method.
- Salaca promenade and the lighthouse - Lighthouse was built in 1925. It's a white rectangular shape tower with a red lantern. Nowadays it no longer works but once served to all fishermen to find the way home. The lighthouse was built because of numerous sandbanks near the coast between Salacgrīva and Ainaži. The Gulf of Riga was the most dangerous area for navigation. In order to protect the shores of Salaca from erosion the local residents decided to build a promenade. It was created by bringing stones from the area. Salacgrīva promenade opened in May 2014.
- The stove of ceramics Naborigama - cocklestove or naborigama was built in the summer of 2007. The stove can reach china baking temperatures for more than 1300 degrees. In order to achieve the necessary heat every year in July the stove is heated for a week. After a week of opening the kiln artists gather to see the results of their work of art.

== Culture ==
- Library

The Social association of Salacgrīva was established in the town at the end of the 19th century. With the help of the association on 4 August 1902, the library of the Social association of Salacgrīva was founded, which was later moved to the newly built association building, which was constructed in 1912. In the beginning, 300 books of various content could be found there, while later the number of books increased until 700 volumes. In 1957 the library was divided in two parts - Salacgrīva town library was separate from the children library.

- Museum

Since 1998, when the Museum of Salacgrīva was established, it has operated as the centre of the history of the region for locals, tourists and history researchers. Materials about fishing and fisheries in the vicinity of Salaca River, the sea coast in Northern Vidzeme, about old lamprey fishing with weirs, the history of Salaca and Svētciems manor houses, on whose lands Salacgrīva developed, about the economic and political life of the town, schools, churches and temples in the vicinity, about well-known locals who have demonstrated great success in pedagogy, science, culture and arts, in business, politics and economy can be found in the archives of the Museum of Salacgrīva.

== Local events ==
- The Mask festival takes place in February. During the festival in the town are workshops in which everybody can create a mask for themselves. There are various traditional musical events.
- On May there are 2 events:The museum night and Raftsmen festival in which everyone can learn the skills of raft binding using raftsmen tools.
- June is the time for Acoustic music festival. The main idea is to popularize acoustic music traditions. During the festival there are ancient musical instrument workshops and seminars.
- On the second Saturday of July people can enjoy many cultural and entertainment events in Sea Festival. During the day there are fish market, concerts, dances, rides in the sea with small ships and fishing boats.
- A week after there's Positivus which is the biggest and most important music and art festival in the Baltics.
- The Classical music festival takes place at the end of July in which are many high-level classical music concerts.
- August is associated with Salacgrīva Town Festival, when the Friday night starts with demonstrations of historical films, Saturday morning is continued with large local market, creative workshops, activities and concerts, which are organized by the associations of the region.
- To promote a healthier lifestyle the Marathon of three bridges is organized annually in September. It is a 6.5 km long distance, which has remained the same for more than thirty years since the beginning of this tradition.
- The Day of lamprey is celebrated on the 2nd Saturday of October. This day can be used to see all lamprey weirs on Salaca River and Svētupe, taste lamprey soup and hot fried lamprey. People can see how lamprey is being caught; songs about sea, rivers and fishermen can be heard and some dance moves can be rehearsed.

== Sport ==
The municipality of Salacgrīva and municipality of Limbaži have jointly established a sports school - Limbaži and Salacgrīva municipality Sports school.

Most popular sport in Salacgrīva is basketball. Salacgrīva Basketball Club is the main organization that develops basketball. Their senior team, BK Salacgrīva, participates in the Latvian Basketball League 3rd division. The club consists of four teams - BK Salacgrīva, Grīva, Kopturis-A, Salacgrīvas vidusskola (the Salacgrīva Secondary School team).

First team to represent Salacgrīva city in Limbažu regional basketball championship was basketball team A/S Brīvais Vilnis in 1994. Most successful basketball team still is Zvejnieku parks, who holds 5 champion titles, 2 silver and 2 bronze medals, fallowed by BK Salacgrīva with 5 champion titles (1 as Kopturis-A/Salacgrīva). 2011 was the last season of Zvejnieku parks team, after it all basketball teams merged in one big basketball organization Basketball club Salacgrīva.

Main organized events are "Beach streetball" in Salacgrīva seashore, "Salacgrīvas Krastu mačs" where the river Salaca divides teams in two - one team represents the left side of the municipality, the other the right side.

=== Basketball club ===
Basketball club Salacgrīva is Latvian amateur basketball team that is based in Salacgrīva, Latvia. BK Salacgrīva is a Latvian Basketball League 3.division champion in 2014. BKS first started in ABL (LBL-3) in 1996.

BK Salacgrīva
- Leagues: RBL
- Founded: 2009 (1994)
- History: Zvejnieku parks (1999–2011) (2009–present)
- Arena: Salacgrīva Secondary School
- Capacity: 300
- Location: Salacgrīva, Latvia
- Team colors: Blue and White
- Main sponsor: Council of Limbaži Municipality
- President: Jevgenijs Mihailovskis
- Team manager: Jevgēnijs Mihailovksis
- Head coach: Jevgēnijs Mihailovksis
- Championships: 1 3.division 10 OC Limbaži
- Website: www.facebook.com/BKSalacgriva
Home	Away	Third

== Religion ==
- St. Mary's Goreti Church of Salacgrīva (catholic church) – the so-called "new" catholic church was consecrated by Jānis Pujats on 27 July 1997. The architect of this church was the Chairman of Salacgrīva Municipality, Dagnis Straubergs. The author of the mosaic of the church of St. Mary Goreti is Mārīte Folkmane, while the great altar cross and replica of the Christ has been created by artist Pēteris Bārda.
- Lielsalaca Evangelical Lutheran Church – it was built in 1777 as a wooden building, which was reconstructed as a stone church from 1853 till 1857. The church was expanded in 1892, attaching an altar room of 500 seats. Following renovations of the church occurred also in 1927. The 200-year anniversary was celebrated in the church on 10 July 1997.
- Salacgrīva St. Virgin Shelter Orthodox Church – it was built in 1873. The architect of this church - R. Pflug – is also the author of the Nativity of Christ or Orthodox Cathedral in Riga.

== Gallery ==
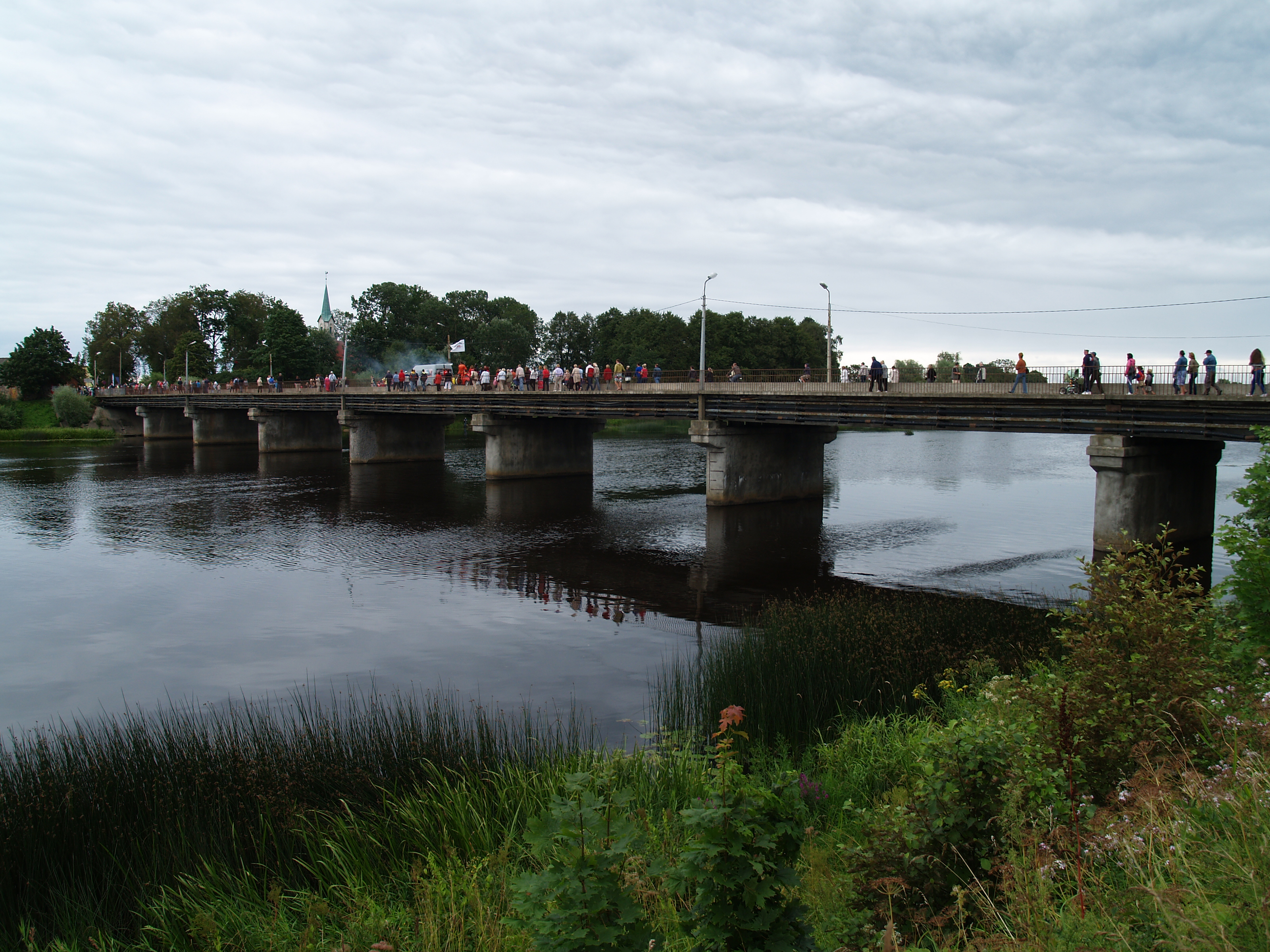
Bridge over Salaca river

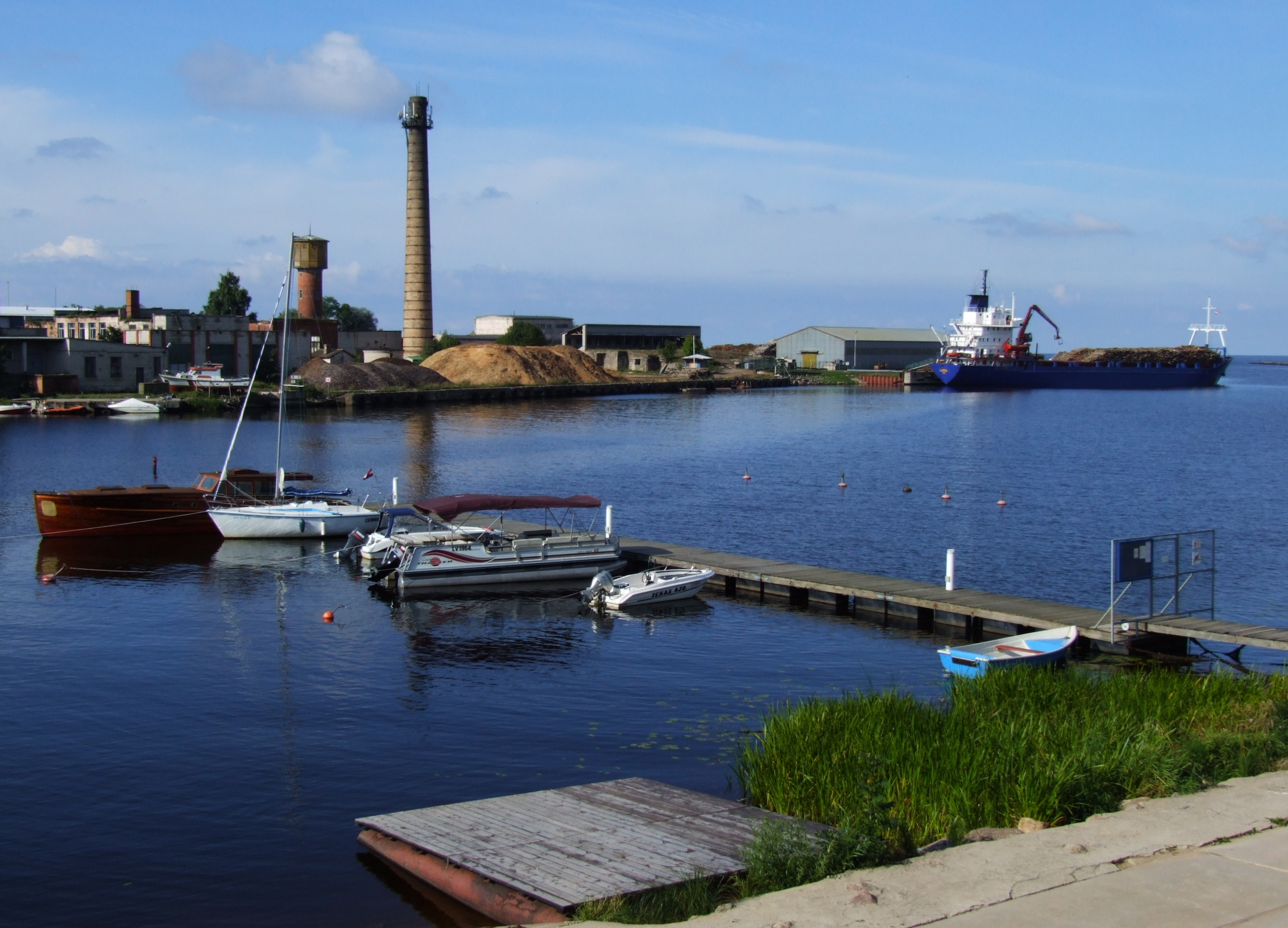
Salacgrīva port

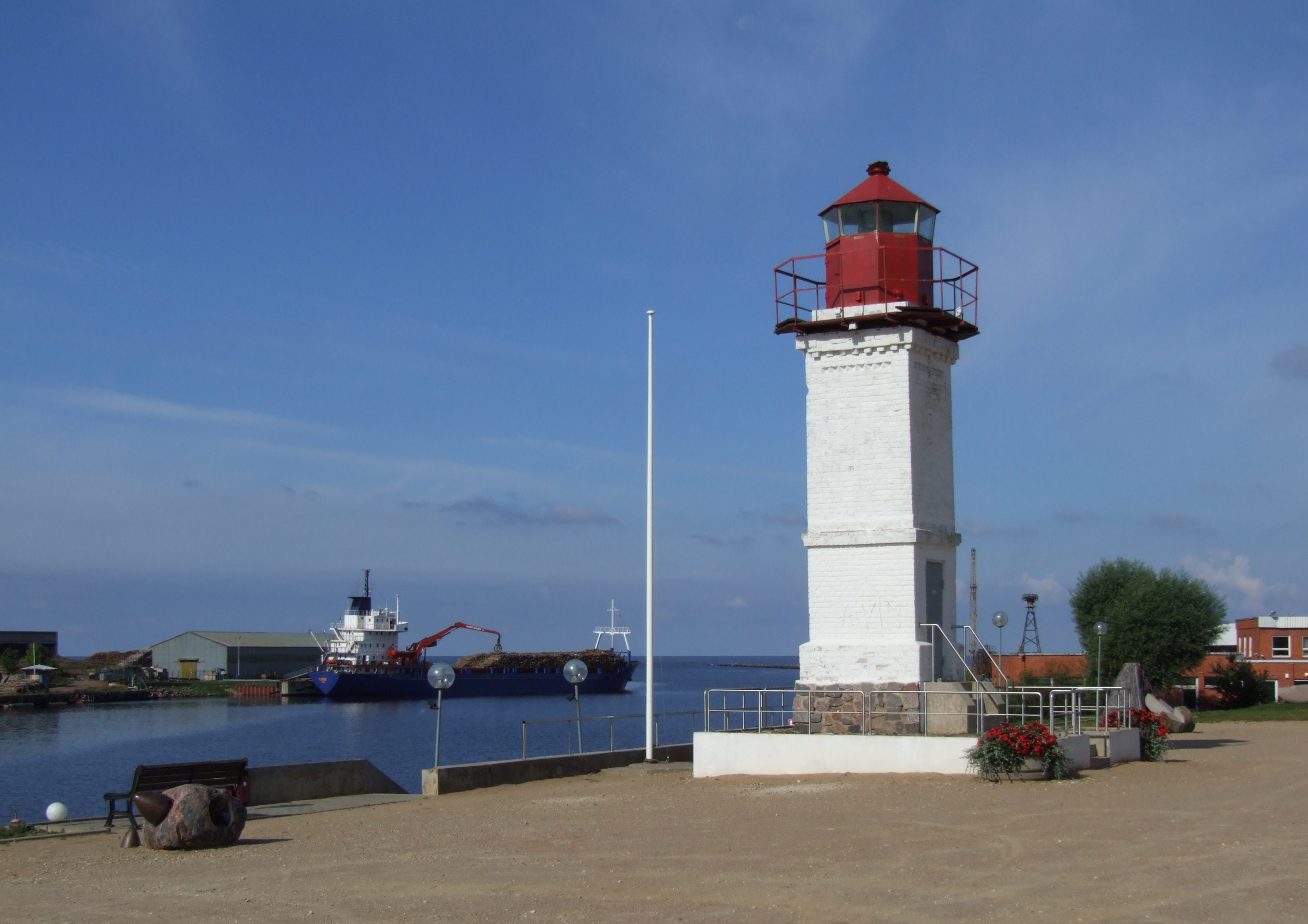
Salacgrīva lighthouse

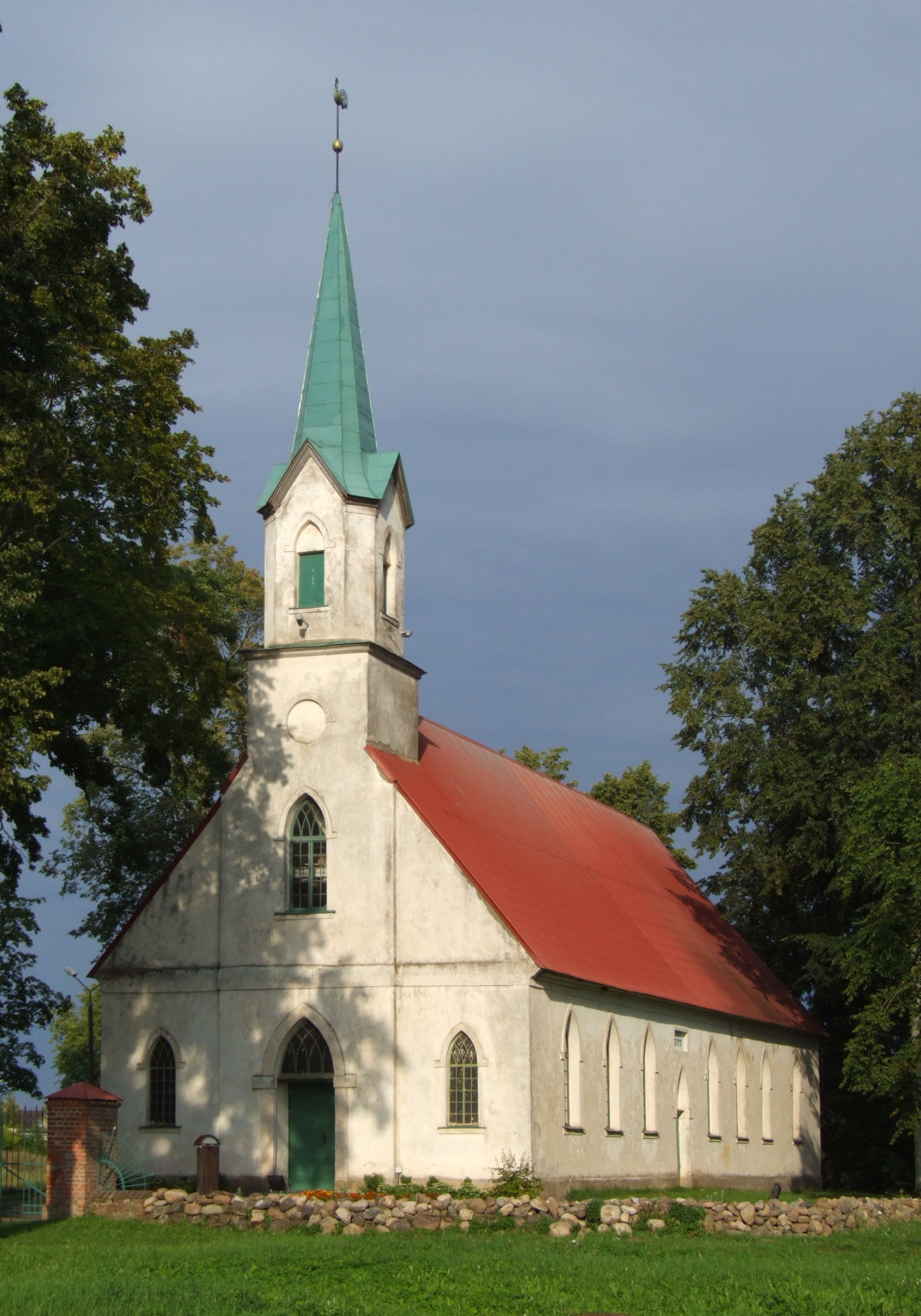
Lutheran church in Salacgrīva

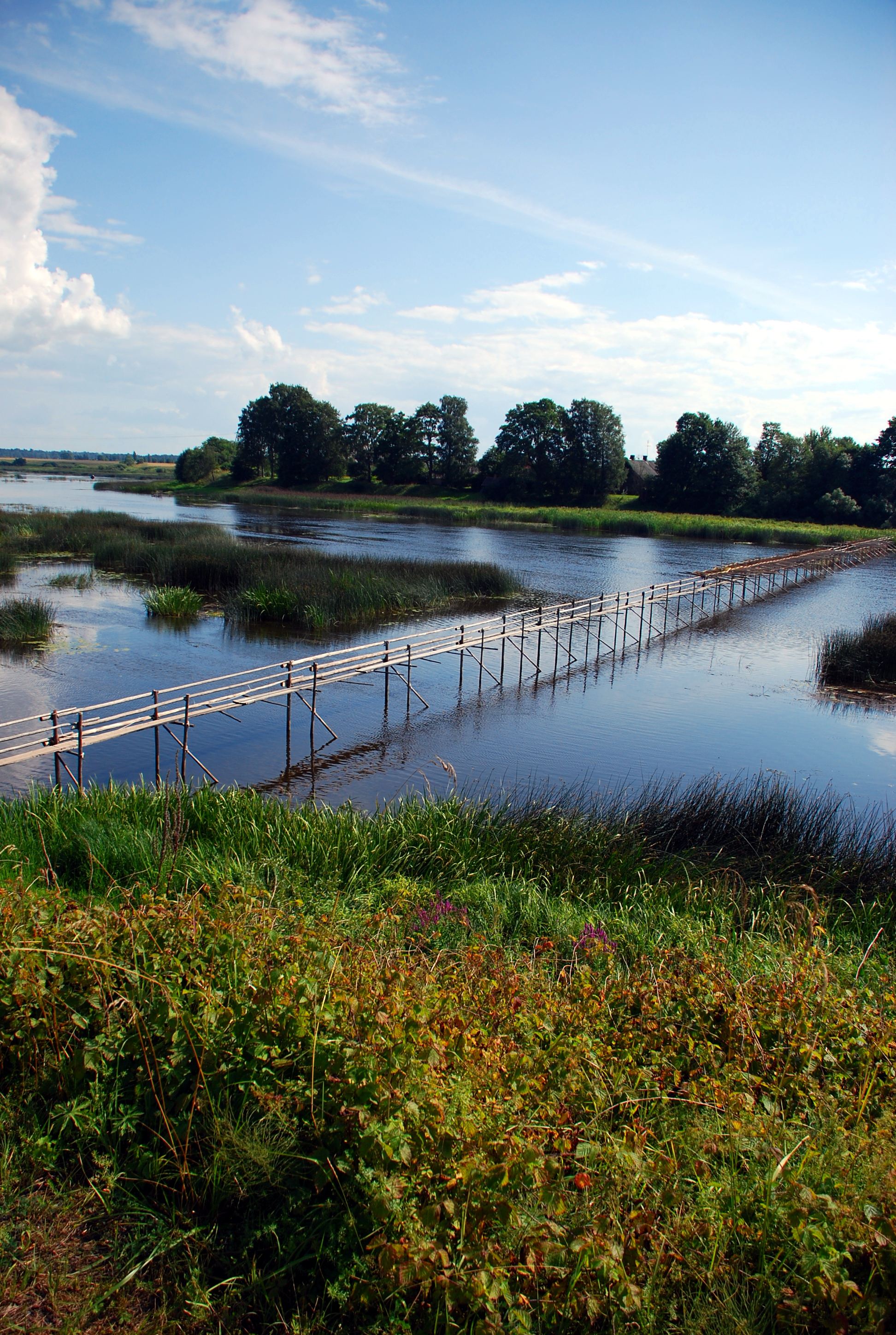
Lamprey bridge over Salaca

== See also ==
- List of cities in Latvia
