= Aizpute Castle =

Castle ruin in Latvia

- Aizpute, Courland, Latvia
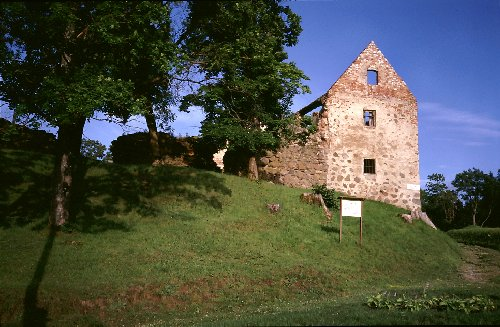

Site information
- Type: Castle
- Condition: Ruins

Location
- Coordinates: 56°43′15.7″N 21°35′42.6″E

Site history
- Built: End of the 13th century
- Built by: Livonian Order

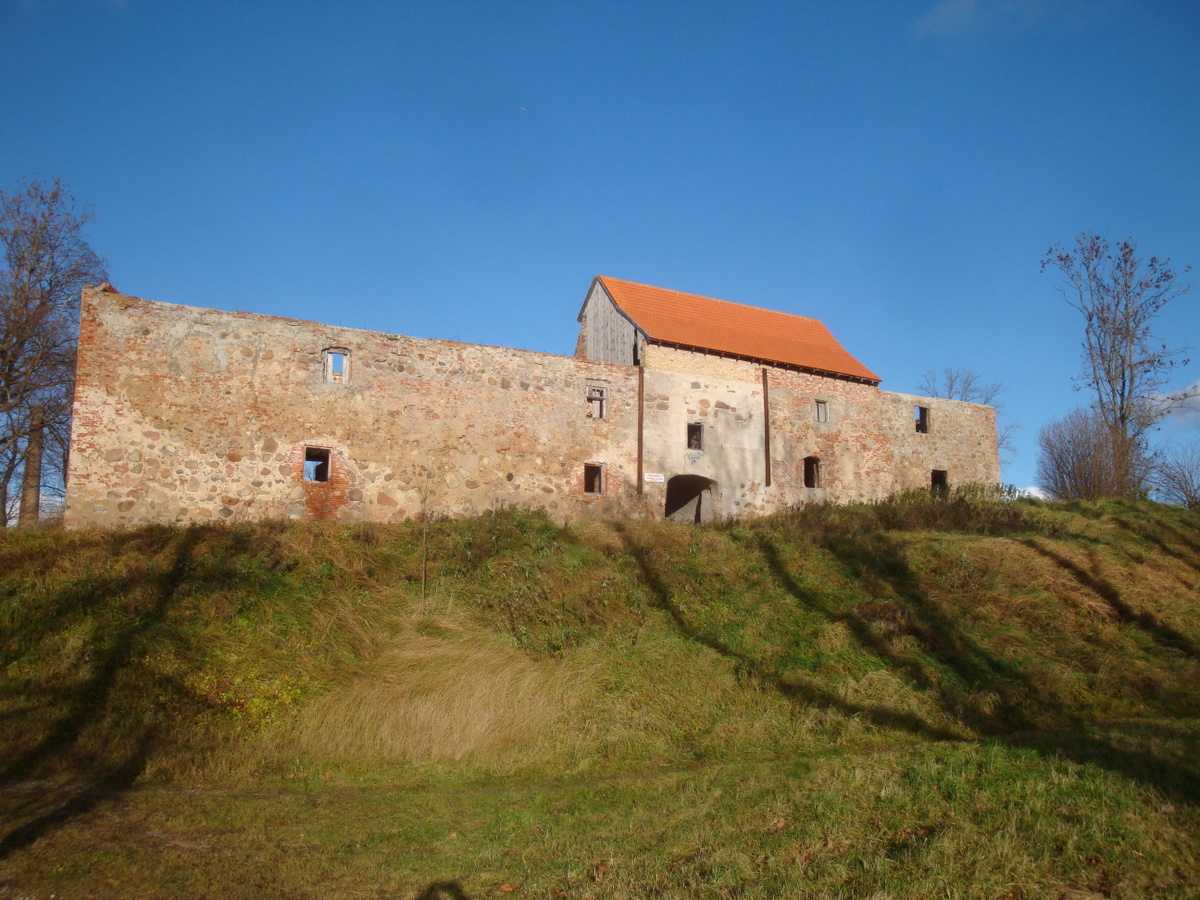
Ruins of Ordensburg Hasenpoth, built in 13th century

Aizpute Castle (German: Ordensburg Hasenpoth) is a Livonian Order castle in the town of Aizpute in the historical region of Courland, in western Latvia. It was heavily damaged during the Second Northern War (1655–1660). Since 1998, the castle ruins are a Latvian historical monument.

== History ==
The place located on a military road between Kuldiga (German: Goldingen) and Liepāja (German: Libau), was first mentioned as German: Asenputten in papers documenting division of Kurland in 1253 and was at that time probably the site of a Curonian Wallburg. Hasenpoth, former Hanseatic city was the seat of the Order and the seat of the Kurland cathedral chapter.

The construction of the Ordensburg, located on the left bank of the Tebra River, begun in 1249 under Order Master Dietrich von Grüningen and served to secure the southern part of the army road from Riga to Goldingen. It was built as a regular Order Castle with a forepart, a corner tower and wooden buildings in the yard. For 1341 Hasenpoth is called as belonging to the Commandery Goldingen and is in 1397 and 1430 explicitly referred to as the castle of the Order. Castle Hasenpoth gained importance as a border castle between religious and episcopal areas, the bishop maintained a castle here, so that these castles were referred to as Bishop Hasenpoth and Order Hasenpoth. In 15th century outside of the castle's walls was built new eastern block. The Order used it until Order collapse after Treaty of Vilnius (1561).

During the Duchy of Courland and Semigallia, the castle was restored and from that time the entrance gate retains plaster with rich and decorative decoration in sgraffito technique. During Second Northern War (1655–1660), the castle was devastated by the Swedish troops. In 1665 Jacob Kettler rebuilt castle and it garrison was reinforced with cannon team. In 1682 the castle became the property of von Michael Friedrich Nold. At this time castle lost it character of fortification and was rebuilt as a residential building still protected by castle walls. Gradually it importance as a residential building was also lost and it remained only partially occupied.

In the second half of 18th century a new manor house was built near the castle mill pond on the other side. A mill, an alcohol brewery and a farmhouse were also built near the pond.

In the beginning of the 19th century, the eastern part of the castle and the southeastern tower were built with smooth brick arches and new partitions. The old part of the castle was only partially inhabited, and the owners lived in the new manor house. From 1863 until the Latvia's agrarian reform of 1920s Aizpute manor house belonged to the Grothuss noble family.

In 1939 the castle was adapted to the needs of the school. It was used until the mid-1970s, after which it was abandoned.

In 1990 restoration work was started and surveys were conducted repeatedly. In 1997, a project for wall anchoring and roof construction was completed, partially implemented in the D-section. In 1999, the castle wall was conserved for a small section of the castle on the right wing, and a tile roof was placed.

== Castle layout ==
In plan, the castle forms a square whose two sides are developed and have a dense row of buildings, which are narrow compared to the courtyard. In the basement of the castle, the barrel vault has been partially preserved. The small rooms were mainly intended as accommodation for the guard and as storerooms, but the large wide courtyard served as a storage place for the carts stopping here.

== See also ==
- List of castles in Latvia
