= Rēzekne Castle =

Medieval ruin in Latvia

- Latgale, Rēzekne, Latvia
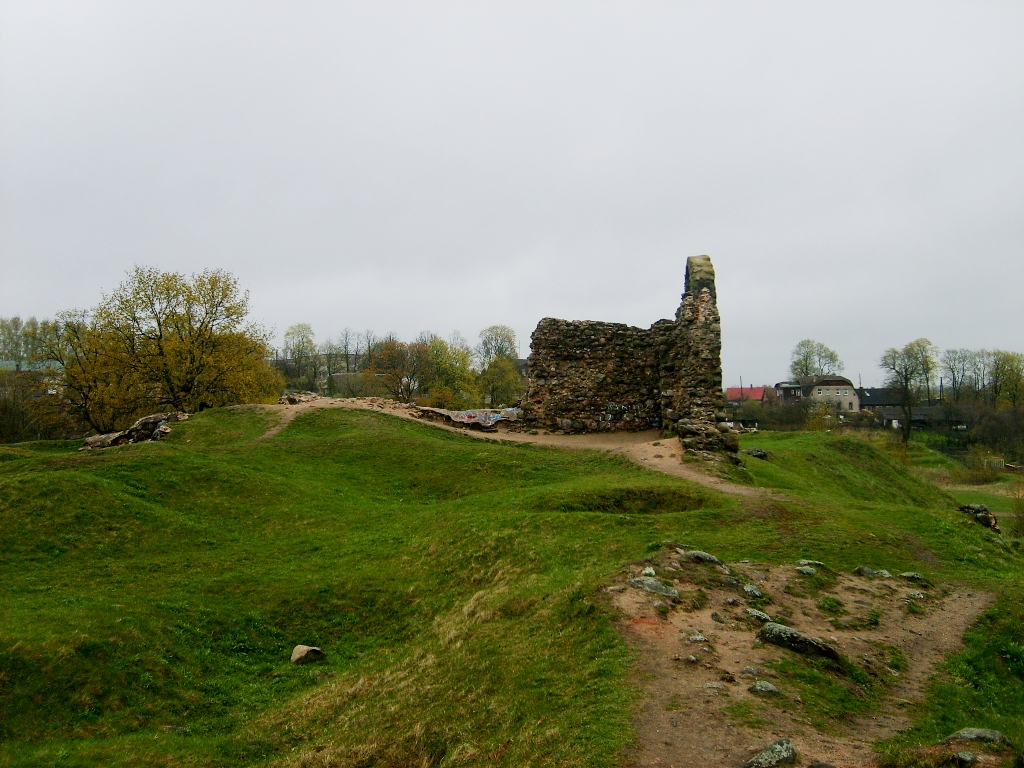
- Biggest remnant of Rēzekne Castle ruins

Site information
- Type: Castle
- Condition: Ruins

Location
- Coordinates: 56.50242°N 27.33454°E

Site history
- Built: 1285
- Built by: Livonian Order
- Demolished: 17th century
- Events: Okay

Rēzekne Castle ruins (German: Burg Rositten) are located in the downtown of Rēzekne, Latvia, a city in the center of Latgale. The castle served as a base of the local Livonian order landlords until the 16th century and also as the main military support base for battles against Russians and Lithuanians. Today, fragments of the stone walls and the foundation can be seen on the ancient castle hill.

== History ==
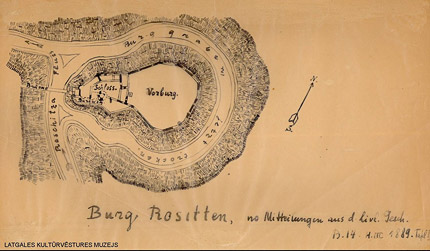
Castle plan in 1889.

Archeological excavations reveal that between the 9th and 12th centuries a Latgalian wooden fortress was situated in the place where the castle ruins now stand. It is unknown when the Latgalian fortress was destroyed; however, in 1285, the master of the Livonian Order Vilhelms Šurborgs built a stone fortress on the Rositten stone hill. The fortress consisted of a two-story brick and stone castle with a three-storey towers and thick brick walls, functioning as the administrative seat of Rezekne.

The castle was ravaged and rebuilt many times. Between 1577 and 1579, it was occupied by Czar Ivan IV Vasilyevich, and after the war it became part of the Duchy of Livonia. During the Polish-Swedish War in 1601, and again from 1625 to 1626, the Rezekne castle was occupied by the Swedish army, during the Second Northern War. The battle took place in 1656, during which the Rezekne castle was finally destroyed as the Swedish troops managed to defeat the much larger Russian forces. In 1660 it was reinstated in the Inflantia, but the castle had lost its former military importance. From 1712 it was left in ruins.

== See also ==
- List of castles in Latvia
