= Lielvārde Castle =

Castle in Latvia

Coordinates: 56.7114°N 24.8382°E

- Vidzeme, Latvia
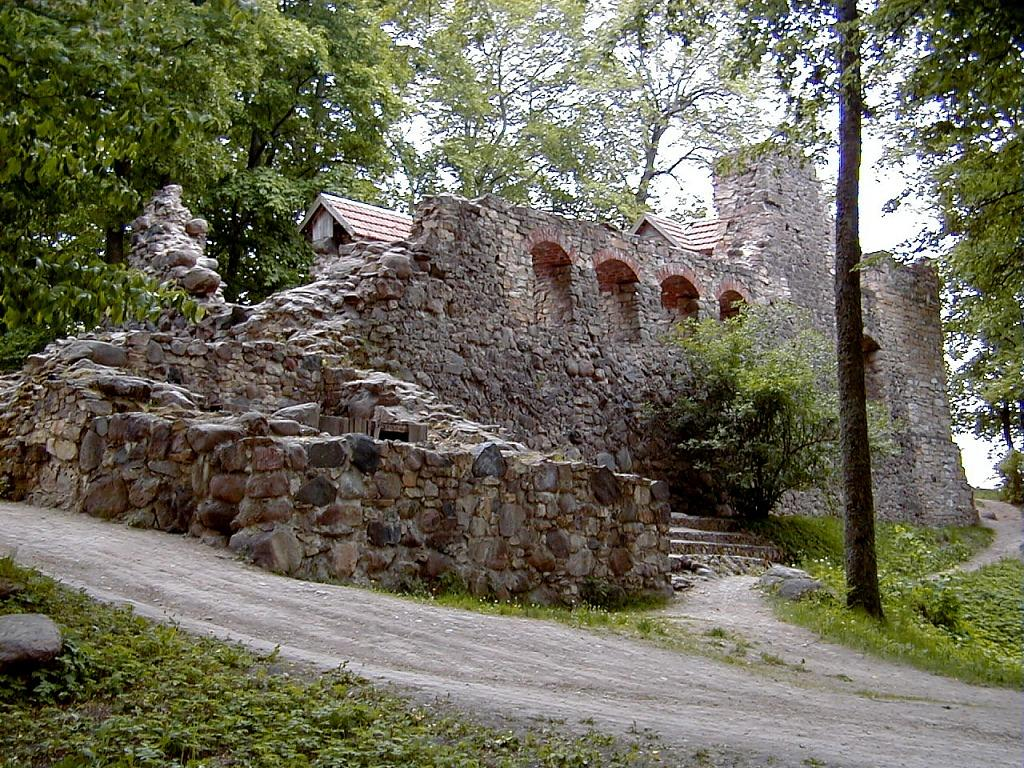

Site information
- Type: Castle
- Open to the public: yes
- Condition: ruins

Site history
- Built: before 1248?
- Built by: Archbishop of Riga
- Materials: dolomite
- Demolished: 1579

Lielvārde Castle (Lielvārde bishop's castle) is a castle in Lielvārde, a town in Ogre Municipality in the Vidzeme region of Latvia.The castle was built at the steep bank of Daugava River, overseeing this important medieval waterway, before 1248 by Albert of Buxthoeven, an archbishop of Riga. During the Livonian War, Lielvārde Castle was destroyed by Russian troops in 1579. Its ruins are conserved up to the level of the second floor.

== History ==
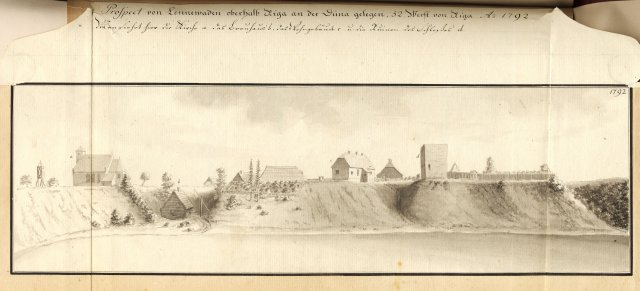
Lielvārde castle ruins in 1792 (Johann Christoph Brotze collection).

In the course of the missionary work in Livonia and the associated construction of fortifications, knight Daniel von Banerow was granted the Lennewarden (Lielvārde) Daugava livs District by Albert of Buxthoeven in 1201. The ancient wooden defense systems of the Daugava livs on the castle hill Livukalns located here were constantly expanded and the livs elder of the castle district continued to rule it. During the Autine uprising, the Crusaders burned the Liv's wooden castle. In 1213, Lithuanian mercenaries captured the elder of Lielvārde castle Uldeveni, but Order of the Sword Brothers bought him from captivity. There are no remains of this wooden structure. The ruins that have survived today largely date from the 14th century and are located on opposite hill from the original fortified complex.

Even before 1229, the bishop's vassal Daniels built a stone castle on the site of the Liv castle. The downstream fortress of Uexküll probably served as a model for the construction of the system, since it was a suitable type for a small vassal castle. After his death, Riga Bishop Nikolai Lielvārde 1248. granted to Riga Cathedral, but 1255 recognized it as his property in. In 1262 Battle at Lielvārde the Samogitians defeated the army of the Order, the remains of which took refuge in the castle. 1361 The castle was occupied and looted by Lithuanian troops. 14-15 In the 16th century, Lielvārde became the center of the bailiffs of the Riga archbishopric t. s. In the Latvian way, while also preserving the status of the farm castle - the archdiocese's bread barn. At the beginning of the 15th century, the archbishop was forced to pledge the castle to the Order until 1435. year.

In the 16th century, the Bernardine monastery of the Antonija Brothers Convent (1514–1534) was located in Lielvārde Castle, and a stone church was built in the courtyard. During the Livonian War, the castle was pledged to the King of Poland under the "pacta protectionis" concluded in 1559 and handed over to the protection of Polish-Lithuanian troops, but in 1577 the castle and the church were destroyed by Russian troops in course of Livonian War. The governor Nils Asersons Mannerscheld of Swedish Livonia partially restored the castle in 1633, but later the medieval building was not repaired and a manor center was established next to it. J.C. Brotze drawing shows that in 1792 the building had two floors, but to this day only one and a half floors have survived and the row of windows on the second floor has disappeared.

At the beginning of the 19th century, the manor house was built in the classicist style. At the beginning of the 20th century, the architect Wilhelm Bockslaff rebuilt the manor house by order of the manor owner, Baron Arthur von Woolf. During the First World War, there was a front line along the Daugava for several years, during the cannon fire, the Lielvārde manor castle was completely destroyed.

== Known Lielvārde fogts ==
The bailiffs of Lielvārde were Archbishopric of Riga "Letu gals" judges ("advocati ecclesiae", "Stiftsvögte") who ruled Lielvārde Castle in the 14th century. Their functions were then taken over by Koknese Castle.

- before 1372 — Heinrich Orghos
- 1391 — Hinke Kastorp, later pledged the castle to the Order.
- 1556 — Stanislaus

== See also ==
- List of castles in Latvia
