= Nekrasovo, Vladimir Oblast =

Nekrasovo Некрасово
- Village
- Location within Vladimir Oblast Location within Russia
- Coordinates: 55°54′N 41°50′E
- Country: Russia
- Region: Vladimir Oblast
- District: Selivanovsky District
- Time zone: UTC+3:00

Nekrasovo (Russian: Некрасово) is a rural locality (a village) in Chertkovskoye Rural Settlement, Selivanovsky District, Vladimir Oblast, Russia. The population was 10 as of 2010.

== Geography ==
Nekrasovo is located 11 km northeast of Krasnaya Gorbatka (the district's administrative centre) by road. Voshchikha is the nearest rural locality.
