= Ēdole Castle =

Castle in Latvia

- Ēdole parish, Kuldīga municipality, Latvia
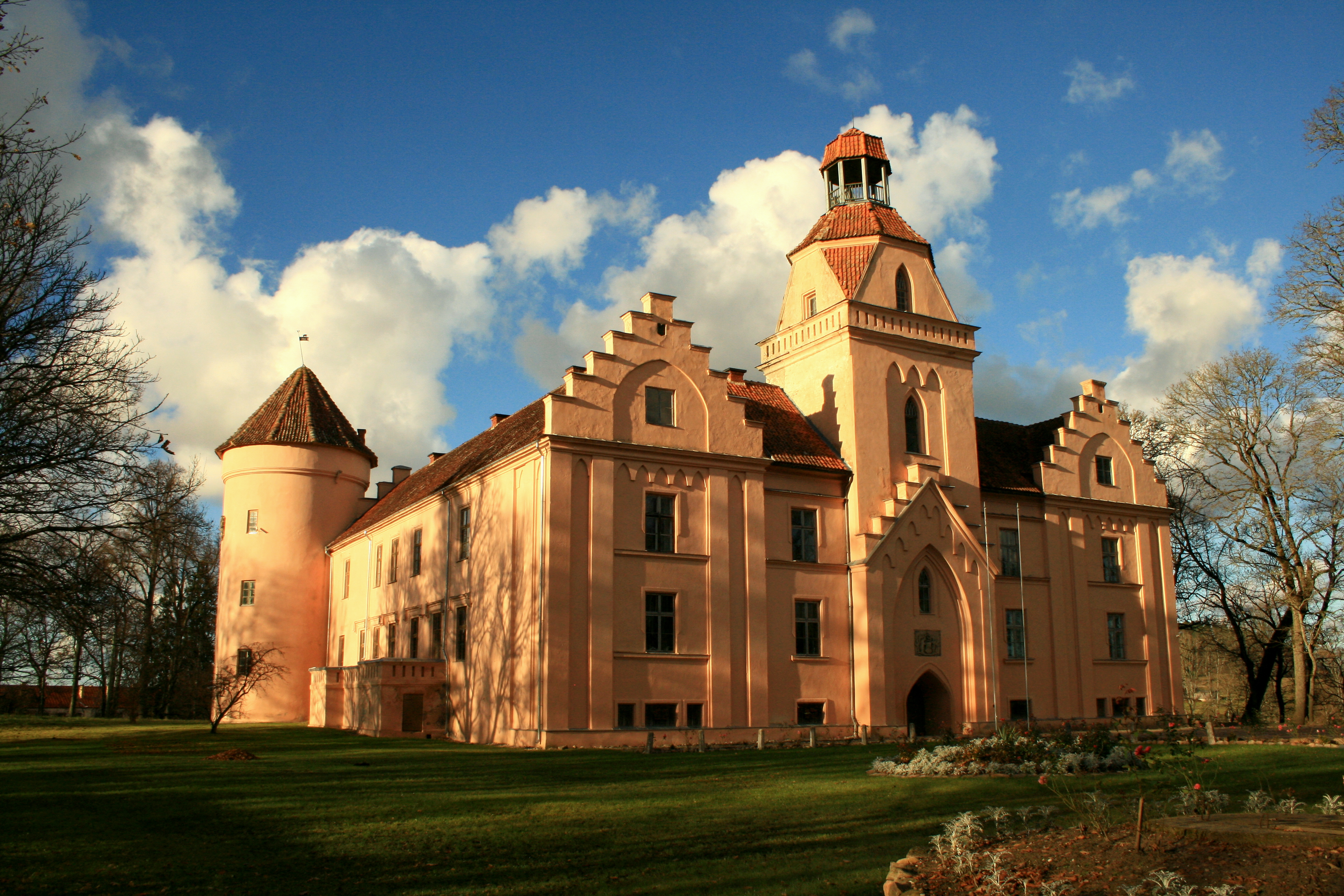

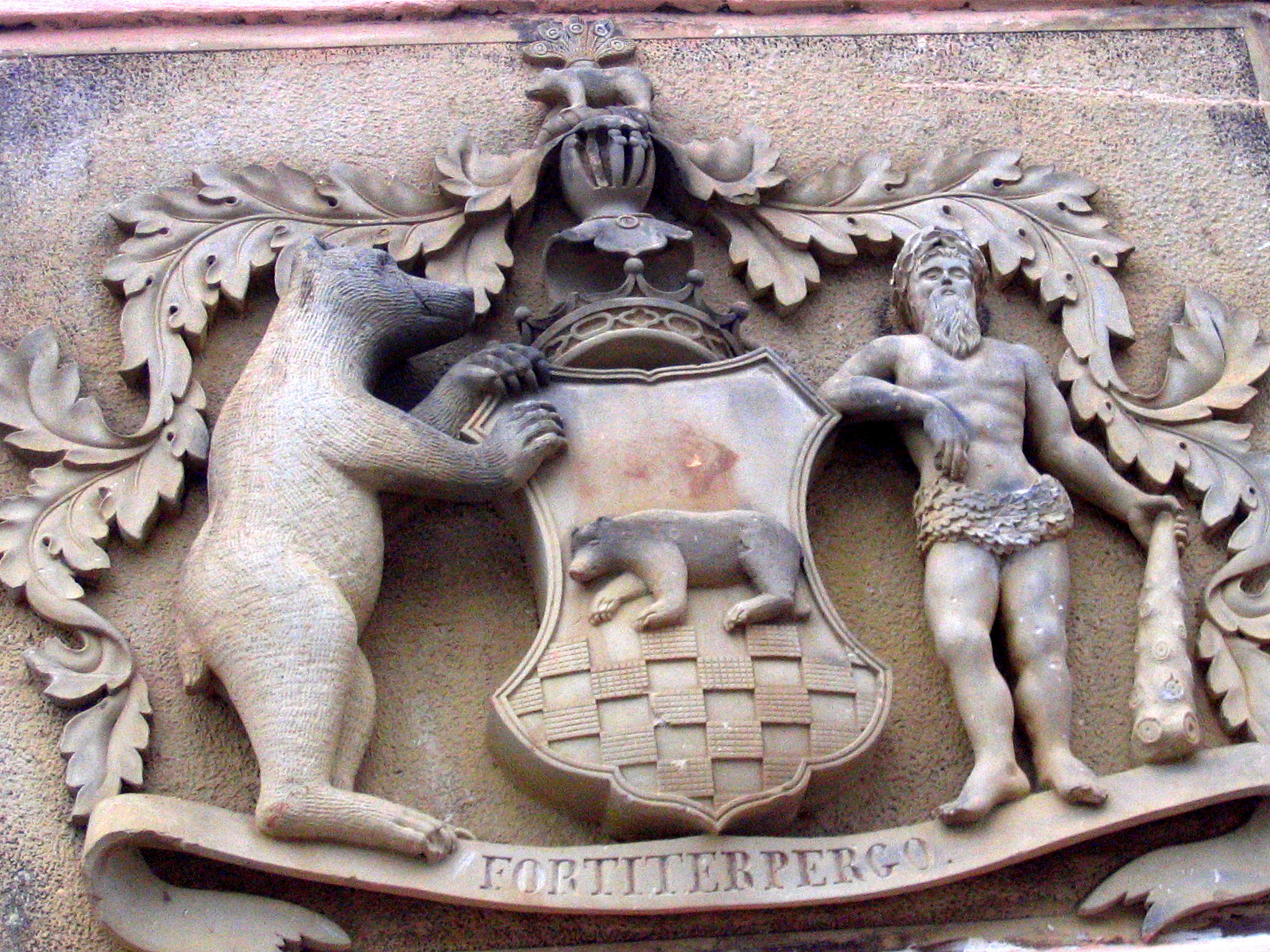
- von Behr family coat of arms on castle

Site information
- Type: Castle
- Condition: Preserved

Location
- Coordinates: 57°01′03″N 21°41′49″E

Site history
- Built: 13th century
- Built by: Bishop of Piltene

Ēdole Castle (Latvian: Ēdoles pils; German: Schloß Edwahlen) is a Gothic Revival castle situated on the banks of Ēdole Lake, in the Ēdole Parish of Kuldīga Municipality, in the Courland region of Latvia. Originally consisting of two residential buildings linked by a stone wall, the castle is surrounded by landscape park. It is considered an architectural and archaeological monument of national importance.

== History ==
The castle was built for the bishop of Courland between 1264 and 1267. It was rebuilt in the 16th century and from 1561 until 1920 it was the property of the Baltic-German Baron von Behr and his descendants.

During the 18th century the castle was expanded and from 1835 to 1841 it underwent a major reconstruction work to become one of the first samples of Neo-Gothic architecture in Kurzeme. The building was partly burned during the Russian Revolution of 1905. Between 1906 and 1907 a household yard and tower were built in one of its corners, being the façade remodelled with its Gothic forms preserved.

== See also ==
- List of castles in Latvia

== Sources ==
- Zarāns, Alberts (2006). Latvijas pilis un muižas. Castles and manors of Latvia (in Latvian and English). Riga. ISBN 9984-785-05-X. OCLC 72358861.
