= Nekrasovo, Perm Krai =

Nekrasovo Некрасово
- Village
- Location within Perm Krai Location within Russia
- Coordinates: 56°36′N 54°27′E
- Country: Russia
- Region: Perm Krai
- District: Chaykovsky
- Time zone: UTC+5:00

Nekrasovo (Russian: Некрасово) is a rural locality (a village) in Chaykovsky, Perm Krai, Russia. The population was 13 as of 2010. There is 1 street.

== Geography ==
Nekrasovo is located 34 km southeast of Chaykovsky. Zipunovo is the nearest rural locality.
