= Aizkraukle Castle =

Castle in Latvia

- Aizkraukles pils; Ascheraden
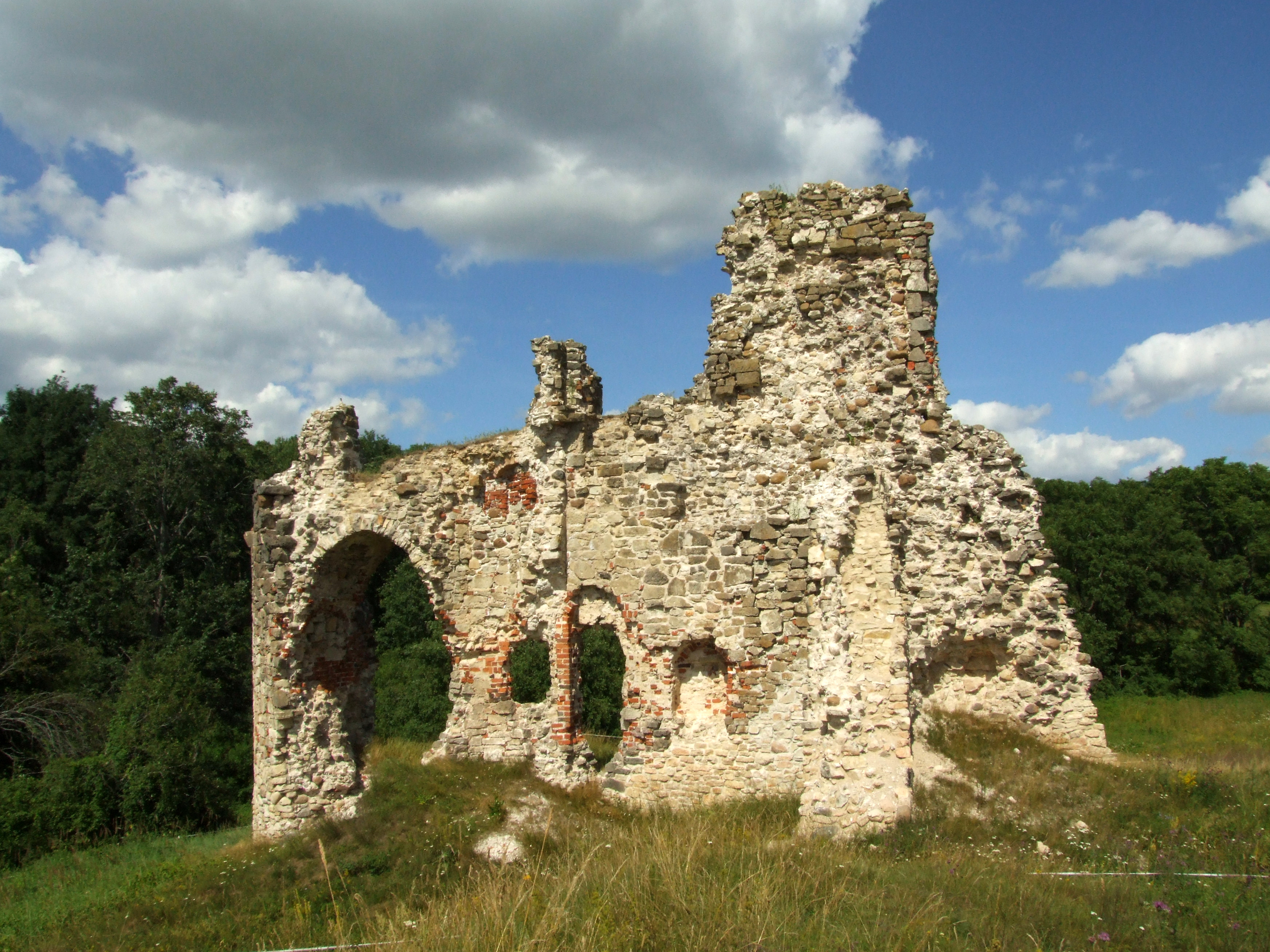

Site information
- Condition: Ruins

Location
- Coordinates: 56°36′52″N 25°9′12″E

Site history
- Built: possibly 1213
- Built by: Livonian Brothers of the Sword

Aizkraukle Castle (Latvian: Aizkraukles pils; German: Ascheraden) is a ruined medieval castle, located on the right bank of the river Daugava in the Vidzeme region of Latvia, to the west of the modern town of Aizkraukle. The castle was built in the second half of the 14th century by the Livonian Order. From 1334 to 1480 it was the seat of a Komtur.

== History ==
In 1559, Aizkraukle was seized by the Poles. In 1577 it was captured by the Russians. The castle was still standing in 1633, but was in ruins by 1680. Today remains of the foundations are still visible, and there is a fragment of a wall up to 5 metres high. The picturesque ruins serve as a popular local tourist destination.

The structure should not be confused with Old Aizkraukle Castle (Latvian: Vecaizkraukles pilskalns; German: Alt-Ascheraden), another medieval castle site, of the 13th century, a few kilometres downstream.

== Gallery ==
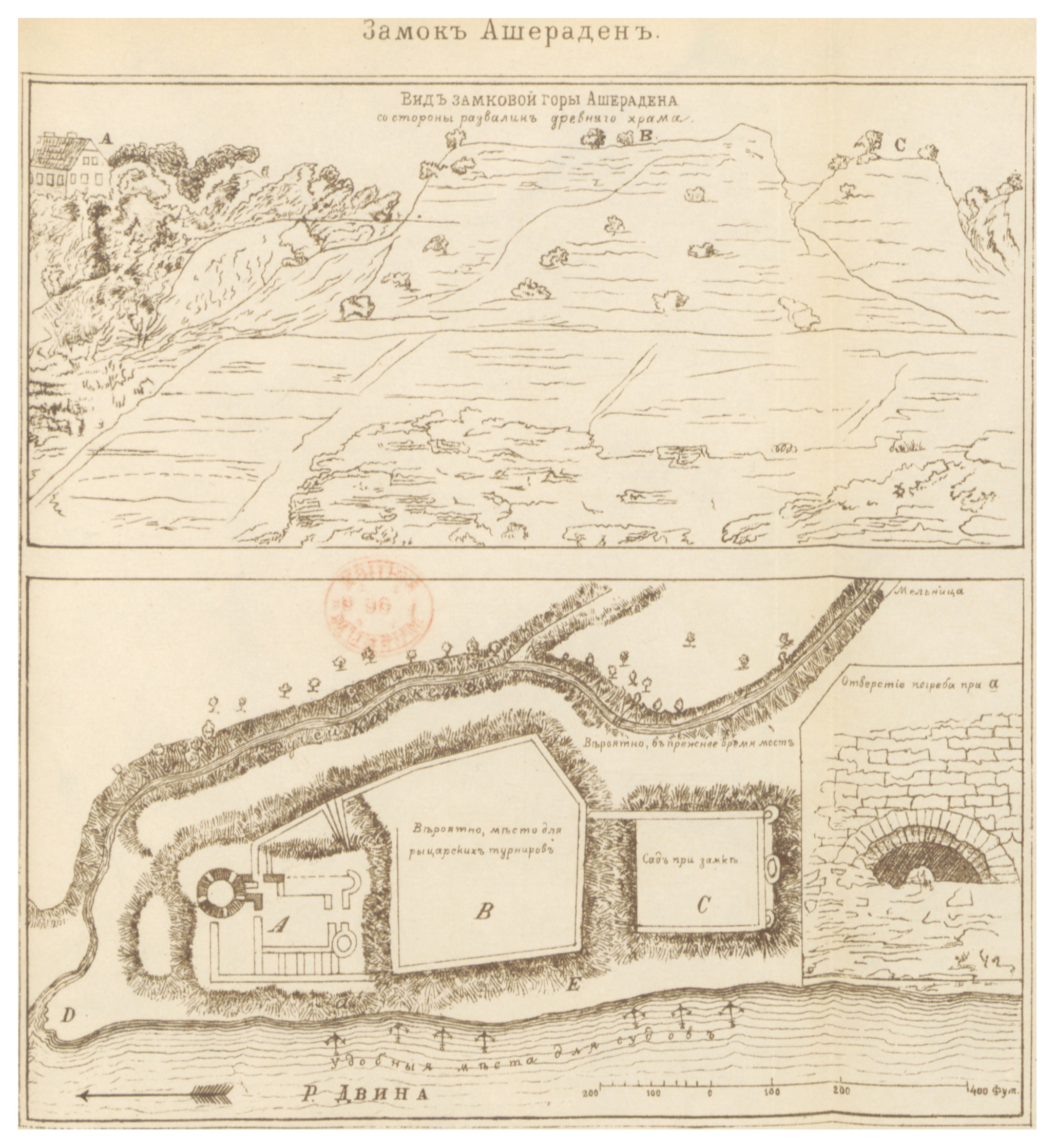
Map
