= Alsunga Municipality =

Former municipality of Latvia

Coordinates: 56°58′54″N 21°34′01″E

Alsunga Municipality Alsungas novads
- Former municipality
- Coat of arms

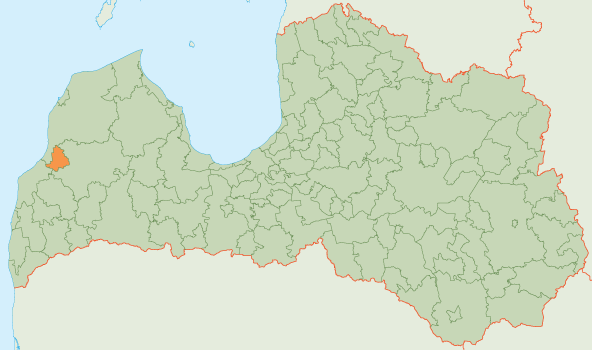
- Country: Latvia
- Formed: 2009
- Dissolved: 2021
- Centre: Alsunga

Government
  - Council Chair (last): Daiga Kalniņa (For The Growth of Alsunga Municipality)

Area
  - Total: 190.90 km^{2} (73.71 sq mi)
  - Land: 186.31 km^{2} (71.93 sq mi)
  - Water: 4.59 km^{2} (1.77 sq mi)

Population (2021)
  - Total: 1,303
  - Density: 6.994/km^{2} (18.11/sq mi)
- Website: www.alsunga.lv

Alsunga Municipality (Latvian: Alsungas novads) was a municipality in the historical region of Courland in Latvia. The municipality was formed in 2009 from Alsunga Parish. The administrative centre was Alsunga.

The municipality consisted of the following villages and settlements: Alsunga, Almāle, Balande, Dienvidstacija, Ziedlejas, Bērzkalni, Būcmaņi, Grāveri, Reģi. As of 2020, the population was 1,268.

On 1 July 2021, Alsunga Municipality ceased to exist and its territory was merged into Kuldīga Municipality as Alsunga Parish.

== See also ==
- Administrative divisions of Latvia
