= Kuldiga Castle =

Castle in Latvia

- Courland, Latvia
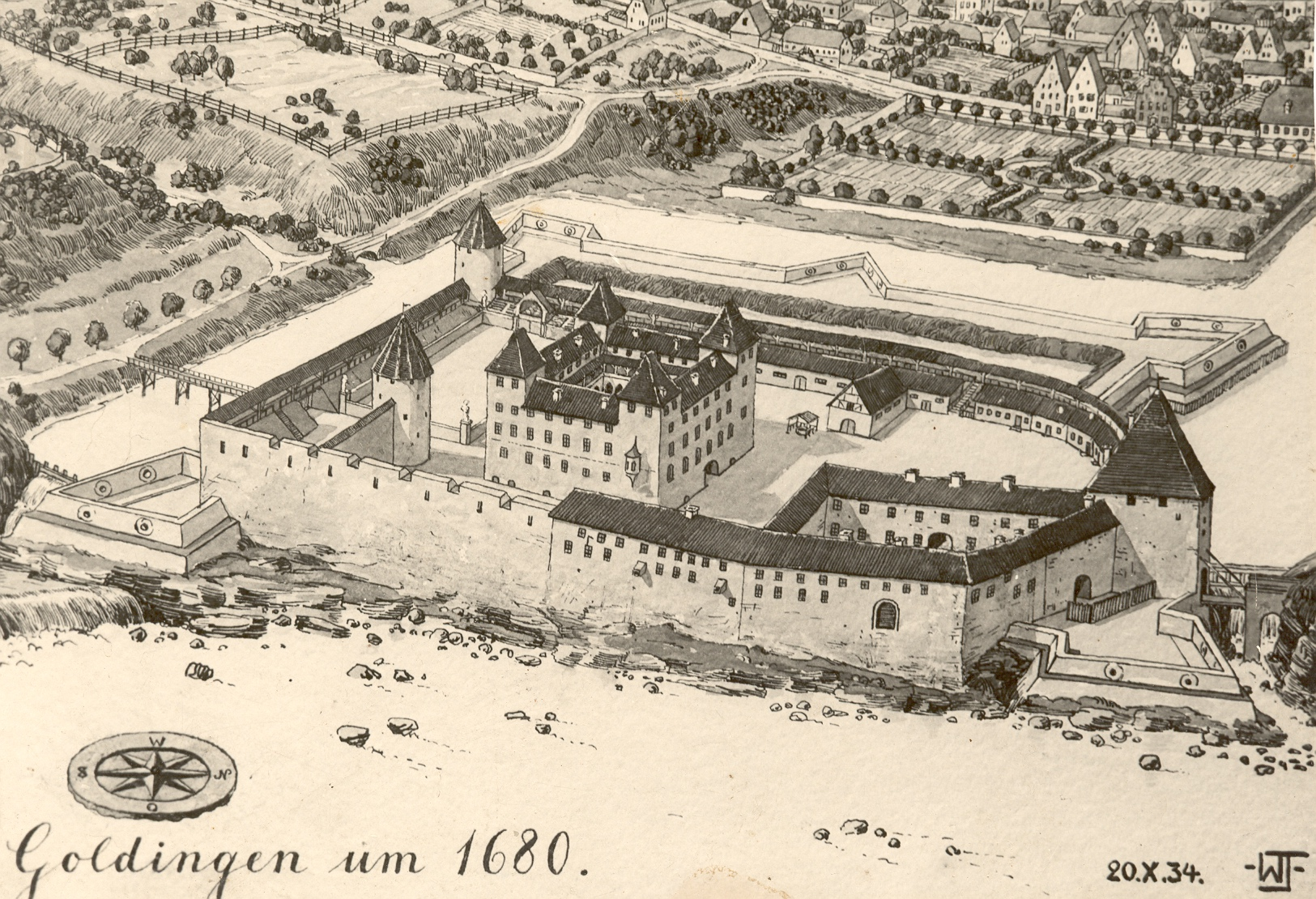
- Kuldiga Castle in 1680

Site information
- Type: Castle
- Condition: Ruins

Location
- Location within Latvia
- Coordinates: 56°58′8.29″N 21°58′35.24″E

Site history
- Built: 1242
- Built by: Livonian Order
- Demolished: 18th. century

Kuldīga Castle (Latin: castrum Guldinge, German: Burc Goldingen, Schloß Goldingen) also Goldingen Castle and Jesus Castle (German: Jesusburg) was a medieval castle of the Livonian Order in historical Courland in town Kuldīga near Venta Rapid. Today on the left bank of the Venta at the end of the old bridge one can find the former castle mill, a castle guard's house and a city park with the castle ruins on Rumba Hill.

National archaeological site, approved by Ministry of Culture of the Republic of Latvia Order No. of 29 October 1998, 128 as an object of state protection No. 1233 : Kuldīga Medieval Castle.

== History ==
=== 13th-15th centuries ===
Between 1242 and 1245 Kuldīga castle was established as the southern outpost of the Livonian order. Initially the castle was called Jesusburg, later after the Curonian name for the place, Burg Goldingen. In 1252 a Komtur of Curonia, whose seat was in Goldingen, was mentioned for the first time. At the end of the 13th century, all friars in Courland were subordinate to the Goldingen Commander.

Goldingen became a military and administrative center in the 14th century.

=== Castle of the Livonian Order Commanders ===
From 1252 to 1560 there are 47 commutations. In the Middle Ages, Kuldīga Castle was the center of the Livonian Order state Kuldīga Command. Kuldīga commanders were the governors of the castle, the commanders of the army unit of the order and the members of the council of Livonian masters. Kuldīga Komturi took part in the masters' elections and could also be elected masters themselves. They were the main court persons (judges) in their jurisdiction and had the right to the death penalty. During the Livonian Crusades, Kuldīga Castle was a military base in the battles of the Order with the undefeated Courland, Zemgale and Samogitia. Kuldīga Castle regiments gathered here, where they were provided with food and ammunition.

The Kuldīga Command was one of the most populous in Livonia. In the 14th century there were 5 city courts in Kuldīga municipality: Aizpute, Alsunga, Durbe, Kuldīga and Vecpils. Each castle district was further divided into villages and villages divided in farmsteads.

As Kuldīga was located on the Livonia - Prussia road, it was the duty of the commander to welcome high guests of the order at Prussia's borders, to receive him in the castle and to continue to Riga.

=== Palace of the Dukes of Courland ===
After the establishment of the Duchy of Courland and Semigallia, Kuldīga Castle became one of the residences of the Kettler Dynasty after 1575.

After the death of the first duke Gotthard Kettler in 1587, his sons Friedrich Kettler and Wilhelm Kettler decided to divide the duchy into two parts, and Wilhelm became the ruler of the Kurland part with a seat in Kuldīga Castle. On October 28, 1610, in Kuldīga Castle, he had a son Jacob, but the mother Duchess Sophie of Prussia died soon after giving birth. Duke Wilhelm held a luxurious funeral for his wife and buried the deceased on December 26 in the basement of Kuldīga Castle. In November 1613, Duke Wilhelm solemnly received the Duke of Pomerania, Philip Julius, in Kuldīga. After the conflict with the representatives of the Kurzeme nobility, on April 4, 1617, in the Kurzeme Landtag, which met at the Skrunda Castle, Duke Wilhelm was deprived of the title of duke and permanently deported from the duchy. After coming to power, Duke Jacob chose Jelgava as his main residence, in 1543 he ordered the remains of his mother to be transferred to Jelgava Castle. In 1652, Duke Jacob appointed Georg Firks, the former Ambassador Extraordinary and Plenipotentiary of the Duke of Courland, to the court of King Louis XIV of France.

Second Northern War 1658. In November, the Swedish invaders, led by Field Marshal Douglas, went to Kuldīga after being captured by Aizpute, who was defended by only 200 men - Kuldīga housewives and Lithuanian soldiers. 1658. At the end of December the castle capitulated. Although the Swedes had promised not to rob us by accepting the capitulation, the promise was not kept. All the property, archives, church equipment, horses and grain stores kept in the duke's and nobles' palace were hijacked. The rich loot was taken to Riga.

Then until 1660 Kuldīga remained in the hands of the Swedes. Then the castle was handed over again to the troops of Duke Jacob. The duke's allies - the Poles and the Brandenburgers - were not much different from the enemies, as Kuldīga and the castle looted the last one left after the Swedish robbery. The castle archive was partially destroyed and partly taken away, however, Kuldīga Castle, unlike many others Kurzeme was not destroyed. Duke Jacob visited it in August 1660 and ordered repairs.

By 1664–1666, the duke could already settle here. The Duchess also moved in Princess Louise Charlotte of Brandenburg, who was solemnly greeted in the Anna field near Kuldīga by pathetically armed housewives, which testified to the city's scarcity. However, the castle was put in order, and the rooms were refinished with silk and wool wallpaper. In later years, Duke Jacob often stayed here with his whole family. Construction work on the castle resumed with a new scope. This is evidenced by the Governor of Kuldīgas report to the Duke of May 10, 1678 that more than 50 000 tiles, 8 to 10 000 bricks and 10 000 floor tiles have been prepared for the construction of the castle.

Jacob's son Frederick Casimir Kettler, who became the duke after his father's death 1681, also stayed at Kuldīga Castle every year. On 12 July, 1691, Kuldīga received the Duke Frederick Casimir Kettler and his new wife, Brandenburg, Princess Elizabeth Sofia. Before that, wallpapers were procured for the as yet unpainted castle premises, which the townspeople brought back from Turlava in 5 large carts. Duke Frederick Casimir visited Kuldīga Castle every year, although not always for a long time. He stayed here the longest in the winter of 1693, when the construction of the zoo was completed, and in the summer of 1695, when the castle underwent major repairs. On May 4, 1693, the duke ordered the repair of the bridges and walls of Kuldīga Castle damaged by the floods.

=== 18th century: the destruction ===
At the beginning of 1701 approaching the danger of Great Northern War the regent of Kurzeme and the later duke Ferdinand Kettler ordered all the luxuries, furniture and wallpaper from Kuldīga castle to be moved to Mēmele (now Klaipėda), this was done so in June of the same year in 18 large carts accompanied by three ducal guards. From Mēmele, Duke Ferdinand went to Danzig (now Gdańsk), where he stayed until 1738. It is possible that the remains of the ancient glory of Kuldīga Castle are still stored somewhere in Poland or Germany. On August 22, Swedish Chief Lieutenant Rotlieb settled in the castle with 450 dragoons. Everything that had not yet been taken away was looted by the Swedes, and so thoroughly that King Charles XII, who stayed in Kuldīga in 1702 from 17 to 27 January could not settle in the castle, but moved into the later mayor Stafenhagen house on Baznīcas Street. Until 1707 the occupied castle was inhabited by Swedish officers. 1708 and 1709. Russian soldiers also destroyed and looted to such an extent that most of the castle was uninhabitable after. Some of the furniture was taken into storage by the owners of Kuldīga. In 1711 the Duchy 's government ordered the surviving objects to be placed in a locked room on the third floor opposite the duke's apartments.

Kuldīga Castle suffered the same fate as most of the medieval castles of Kurzeme after the Great Northern War. The castle was no longer inhabited and began to collapse. Although the damage of the war was not great, the castles which were not needed by the duke living abroad or the nobles of Kurzeme, were not repaired. What had not been destroyed by the enemies was destroyed in a short time by rain, frost and mold. Abandoned castles, which were located near larger settlements, were not very lucky - the inhabitants used them as quarries. The superintendent moved with his chancellery to a house in the city. The castle mill collapsed the fastest. On 15 August 1713, Duke Ferdinand Kettler ordered them to be offered to the housekeepers of Kuldīga for rent, but due to the poor condition of the mill, no one wanted it.

The roof of the northern wing of the castle was invaded in 1727. The gate tower, the forecourt buildings and part of the outer wall had already collapsed. There were still some cannons on the walls. Useful windows and doors from the buildings were removed and delivered to Kuldīga Manor. The rafters of the roof of Castle were completely rotten, the roof of one of the towers fell, and the castle church was completely ruined. The only inhabitant of the castle was a guard who lived in a log house in the courtyard of the forecourt.

The hall of the castle convent, called the ship hall, collapsed in 1743. The outer wall of the northern hull collapsed in. However, not all the castle's life was lost. In a locked and sealed room on the second floor stored things from the dilapidated castle church and the duke's rooms: many wood carvings, including the duke's coat of arms, doors, painting pedestals and decorative columns, 16 paintings, robes, chairs and tables, carved bed parts, trays, trays frames, torn gilded leather wallpaper and various stuff. The locked arsenal still contained a large number of weapons: 1,014 muskets, 12 carbines, 64 unusable muskets, rifle parts, cold weapons: partisans, spades, ashes, bullet molds, as well as plowshares, perches, iron pots. Property stored in the castle 1743. In 1769, the clerk of the court of the governor of Kuldīga deposited it with the widow of the castle guard, but 1769.

== 19th century and since: the ruins ==
In 1801, Goldingen Castle was already a ruins with towering walls. Kuldīga Governor von Zaks ordered the demolition of the castle ruins. In the drawing of Kuldīga in 1826, the castle ruins are no longer depicted, which indicates that the castle ruins had already disappeared from the earth surface. In the 1960s, Kuldīga city authorities established a city park on the territory of castle ruins.

== Characteristics of the Ducal Palace ==
A drawbridge and a large double gate in the large gate tower led to the forecourt of Ducal Palace. On the first floor of the tower, under which there was a basement, there was a guard, on the second floor - the living quarters of the mayor. The gates of the old bridge over the Venta from the suburb were also preserved. The long two-storey building along the Venta, which was directly attached to the gate tower, housed the chancellor's court and servants' premises, the cash desk, the chancellery, the apartments of the court prosecutor, the finance manager and the pastor, the kitchen and the arsenal. A round powder tower stood in the southeast corner of the forecourt.

On the southern side, during the dukes, an arena and a brick hall were built, as well as a large duke's horse stable with 36 windows and 72 stalls. Also on the side of the forecourt, on the side of the present Kalna Street, inside the wall was a relatively large two-storey building, which housed the lower servants of the court: horsemen and butlers, as well as cattle barns and a stable. Separately, there was a smithy on this side, as well as bakeries and new brewery buildings. The watermill operated on the north side, next to the gate tower. There was a wooden sauna in the castle garden behind the southern wall.

Below the duke's family residence - the castle - there was a cellar with an entrance from the courtyard. To the right of the castle gate opening, a door led to the basement, to the left - to the prison (the present surviving vaulted room on the ground floor). The vaulted rooms on the first or ground floor had a food barn, a storage and wine cellar, as well as a drink manager's apartment.

The doors of the upper floors of Castella led from the two-storey gallery. A parade staircase led from the castle courtyard to the duke's living quarters on the second or main floor on the Venta side. The doors of the high living rooms and the common bedroom of the dignitaries were decorated with wood carvings, the rooms were luxuriously furnished: white glazed tiled stoves, chairs draped with leather and velvet, a mirror, an octagonal stone table. The duchess's rooms gave access to the Great Hall, most likely the former Knights' Chapter Hall in the northern corps. In addition to several smaller rooms, the second floor had a large dining room (presumably in the southern building) and a castle church. It housed an altar with two large brass candlesticks, a pulpit, a pulpit covered in white and black velvet, a wood-carved, gilded baptismal font, a duke's seat in front of the altar decorated with wood carvings, and a balcony with an organ.

== The zoo ==
In 1690 Duke Frederick Casimir Kettler ordered to build a zoo in the south of the castle garden. As the territory belonging to the castle was too small for him, the Duke until 1693. bought land from Kuldīga landlords for 2400 dallers. Trees were planted in the zoo, it was covered by a fence of 882 sections. Reindeer were raised in the garden and hunted there by the dukes and their guests. In 1691 A special hunting lodge was built in the garden. After the Great Northern War in 1710 there were only about 20 deer left in the zoo, which was supervised by the Duke's official - a garden supervisor who lived in a house at the end of the property. The house was still visible in the early 1930s. In 1720 the widow of the Duke of Courland Anna of Russia ordered the remaining deer to be taken to Saint Petersburg. As the relocation took place during autumn, all but one deer died along the way.

In 1780 territory of the zoo was transferred to the manor of the Duke of Kuldīga. The name of a neighborhood Putnudārzs (Bird Garden) has been preserved as a testimony to the former duke's zoo. In ancient times four-legged creaturs were also called birds in Kurzeme

== See also ==
- Kuldīga
