= Grāveri =

Grāveri is a place name in Latvia that may refer to:

- Grāveri Parish in Krāslava Municipality
  - Grāveri, Krāslava Municipality, the parish administrative center
- Grāveri, Kuldīga Municipality, also part of the municipality's Alsunga Parish
- Grāveri, Līvāni Municipality, also part of the municipality's Jersika Parish
