= Reģi =

Village in Latvia

Coordinates: 56°59′45″N 21°37′17″E

Reģi is a village in Alsunga Parish, Kuldīga Municipality in the Courland region of Latvia.

On 23 February 2007 a huge fire caused 26 fatalities in Reģi Manor, an institution for mentally disabled near Alsunga, which was later closed and government took a decision to move the institution to Gudenieki. It was the most fatal fire in the modern history of Latvia.

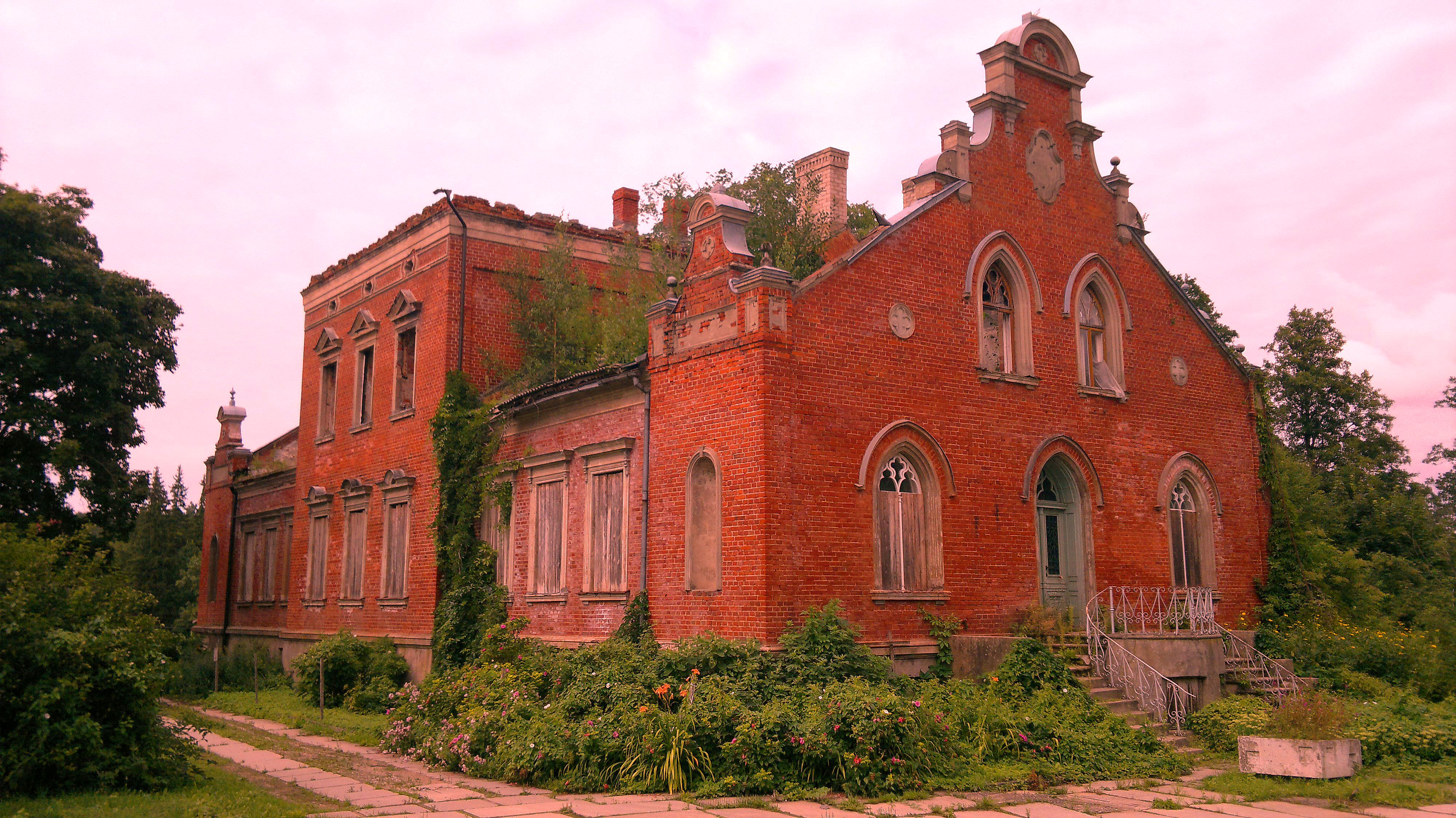
Reģi Manor

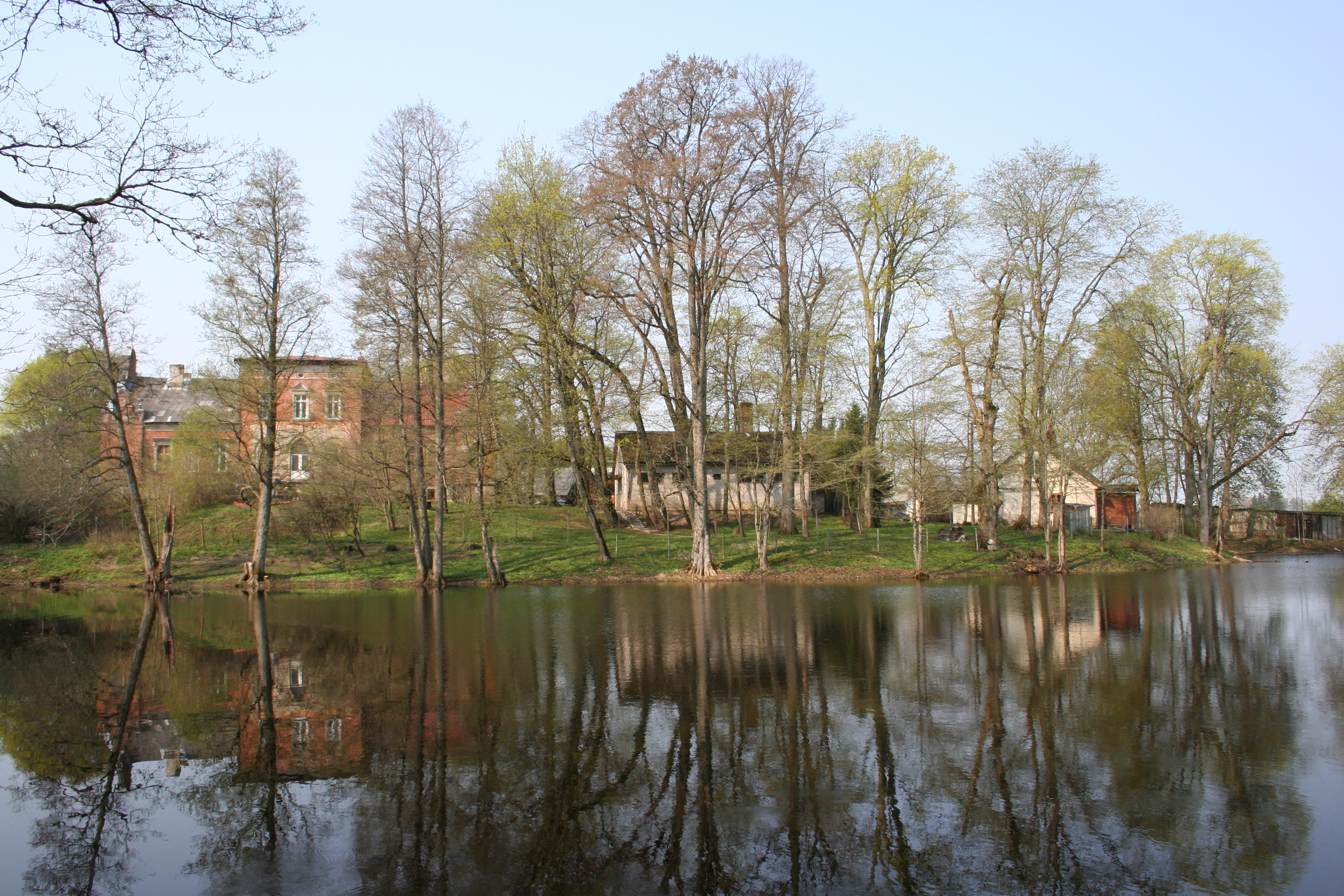
Reģi Manor
