= Reģi Manor =

Manor house in Latvia

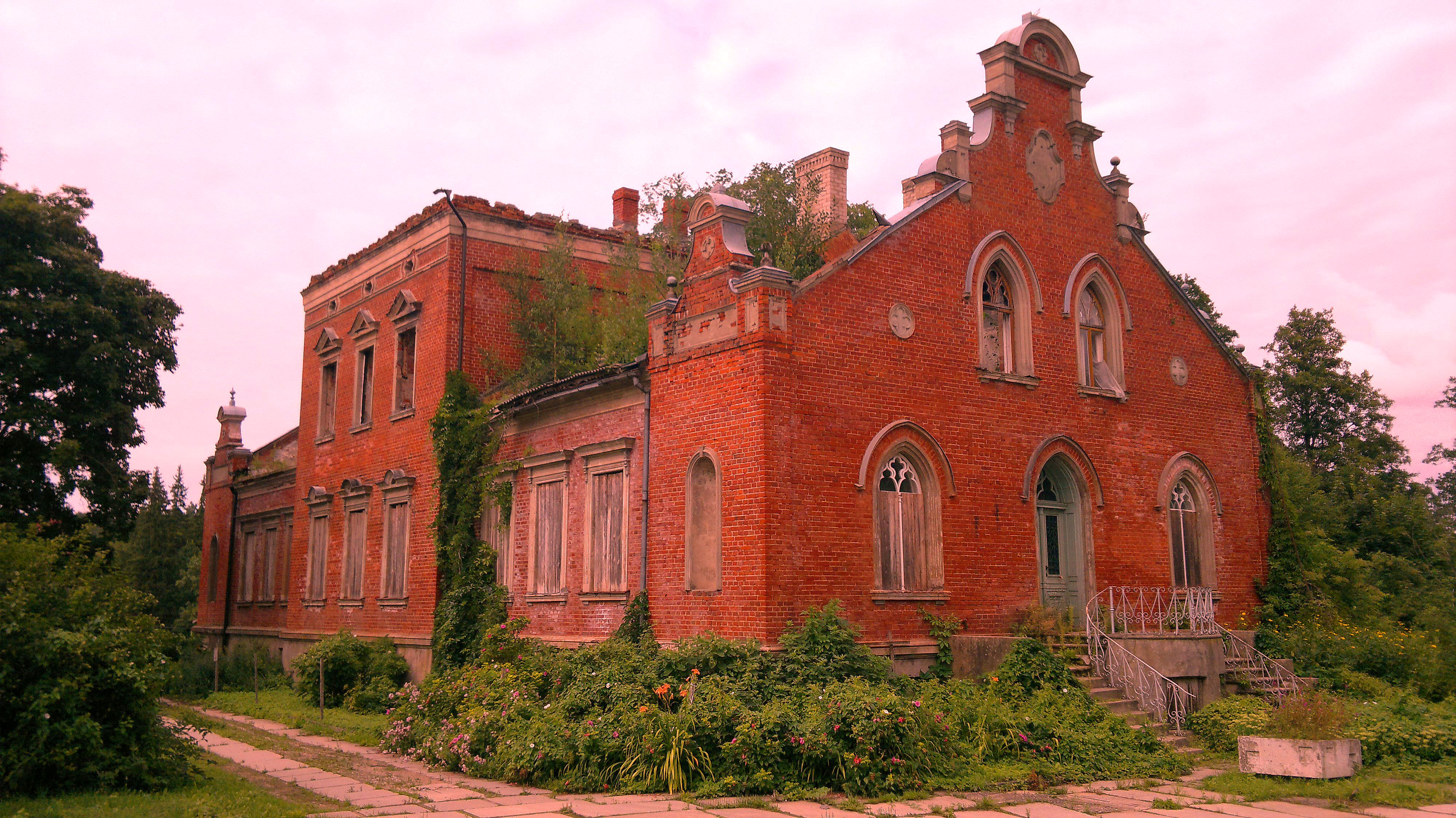

- Location within Latvia

General information
- Location: Reģi, Kuldīga Municipality, Courland, Latvia
- Coordinates: 56°59′46″N 21°37′20″E
- Completed: 1890
- Client: von Schlippenbach

Technical details
- Structural system: ruins

Reģi Manor (Latvian: Reģu muižas pils, German: Gut Reggen) is a manor house in the village of Reģi in Alsunga Parish, Kuldīga Municipality in the Courland region of Latvia.

== History ==
German: Gut Reggen was first mentioned in writings around 1253. In 1704, according to Edgar Dunsdorf, the manor, together with the Gut Almahlen, belonged to the von Schlippenbach family. Later the manor belonged to the Štempeļi family. The current manor house was built in 1890, probably according to the design of Paul Max Bertschy. Until the agrarian reform in Latvia, manor was privately owned. After the manor became state-owned, a hospital was established there, and later - a social care center "Regi". On 22 February 2007, a devastating fire broke out at the Regi social care center, killing 23 of the 90 residents. It became the most devastating fire in the history of Latvia. After the fire, the care center was closed and its residents moved to Gudenieki.

Entrepreneur Valentīns Kokalis bought the burnt-down building at auction in 2011 in order to build a hotel. After the fire, the Latvian Association of Castles and Manors called for the building to be preserved and restored.

== See also ==
- Wolmar Anton von Schlippenbach
- List of palaces and manor houses in Latvia
