= Bērzkalni, Alsunga Municipality =

Village in Latvia

Coordinates: 56°57′05″N 21°30′00″E

Bērzkalni (also Stirnas and Stirnumuiža) is a village in Alsunga Parish, Kuldīga Municipality in the Courland region of Latvia. From 2009 until 2021, it was part of the former Alsunga Municipality.
