= Alsunga Castle =

Castle in Latvia

- Alsunga, Courland, Latvia
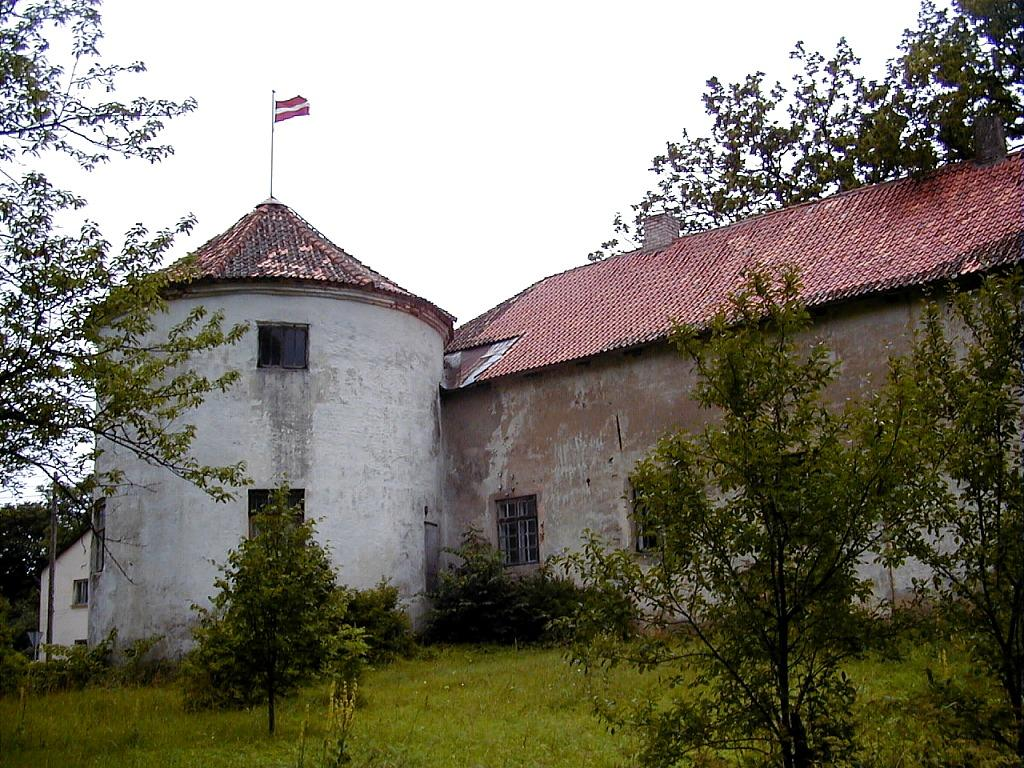

Site information
- Type: Castle
- Condition: Partly restored

Location
- Coordinates: 56°58′52.2″N 21°34′07.6″E

Site history
- Built: 1372
- Built by: Livonian Order

Alsunga Castle (Latvian: Alsungas pils; German: Schloss Alschwangen) is a castle in Alsunga village, in Alsunga Parish, Kuldīga Municipality, in the Courland region of Latvia. It was built for the Livonian Order during the first half of the 14th century.

== History ==
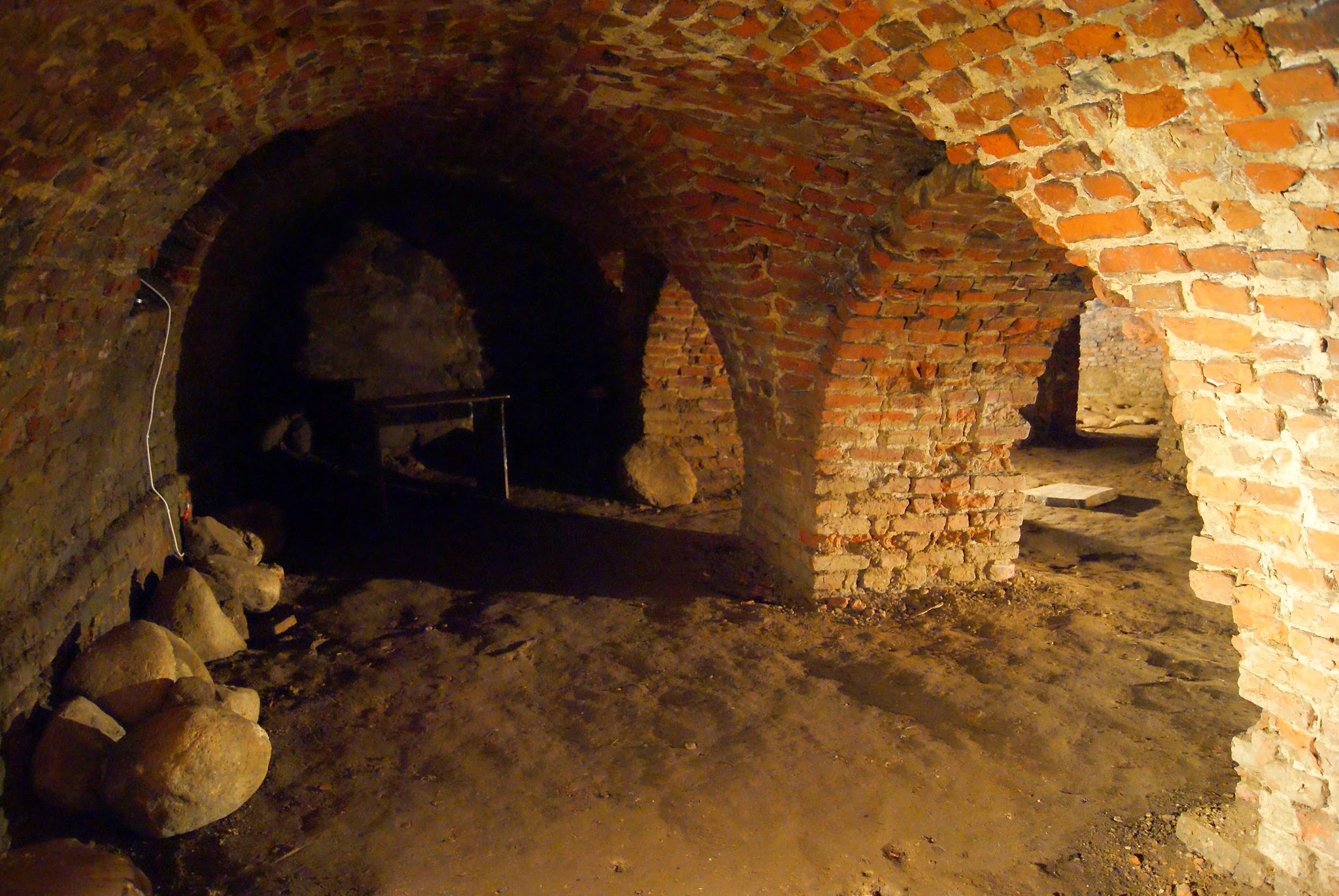
Castle foundation

Alsunga Castle was built near the Curonian castle mound, which was later called Alsungas Dižgabalkalns, in written sources it was mentioned as Aliswangis.

The settlement was mentioned in the written sources for the first time in 1231 in a contract between the elders of a Curonian tribe and the papal envoy Baldwin of Alna. During the time of the king Lammekinus Alsunga was part of his Bandava country.

In 1341, the Livonian Order Kuldiga Commandry in Alsunga was fortified, and in 1372 the Order built a quadrangular stone castle, which was later supplemented with round towers. The Order Cemetery, which was subordinated to the Kuldīga Commandry, was established there.

In the Duchy of Courland and Semigallia from 1573 to 1728, Alsunga Castle Manor belonged to Marshal Schwerin of the Duchy of Courland in the Alsunga Parish. In 1623, then landlord Johan Ulrich von Schwerin married in the Catholic Church tradition Miss Barbara Konarska of Polish-Lithuanian descent and Catholic. In 1632, he brought the Jesuits to Alsunga. As a result of the Jesuit missionary work, part of the people turned to the Catholic faith, nowadays their descendants live in Latvia Suiti folklore.

In 1738, Alsunga came into the possession of the dukes of Duchy of Courland and Semgallen. Since then, the complex was the administrative center of the estate Alsunga.

In 1741 the castle was rebuilt into a castle in the baroque style.

After the castle had been nationalized in 1920, a dairy was established there in 1925. In 1939 the second floor was extended and the building rebuilt for the local school.

== See also ==
- List of castles in Latvia
