= Balande =

Village in Latvia

Coordinates: 56°59′51″N 21°34′49″E

Balande city Municipality is a village that is located in Alsunga Parish, in the Kuldīga Municipality of the Courland region of Latvia.
