= Dienvidstacija =

Village in Latvia

Coordinates: 56°58′24″N 21°33′39″E

Dienvidstacija (also Alsungas stacija) is a village in Alsunga Parish, Kuldīga Municipality in the Courland region of Latvia.
