= Grāveri, Kuldīga Municipality =

Village in Latvia

Coordinates: 56°56′18″N 21°36′21″E

Grāveri is a village in Alsunga Parish, Kuldīga Municipality in the Courland region of Latvia. From 2009 until 2021, it was part of the former Alsunga Municipality.
