= Būcmaņciems =

Village in Latvia

Coordinates: 56°58′57″N 21°35′20″E

Būcmaņciems (also Būcmaņi) is a village in Alsunga Parish, Kuldīga Municipality in the Courland region of Latvia.
