= Ziedlejas =

Village in Latvia

Coordinates: 56°59′15″N 21°33′31″E

Ziedlejas is a village in Alsunga Parish, Kuldīga Municipality in the Courland region of Latvia.
