= Kuldīga =

Town and capital of Kuldīga Municipality, Latvia

- Town
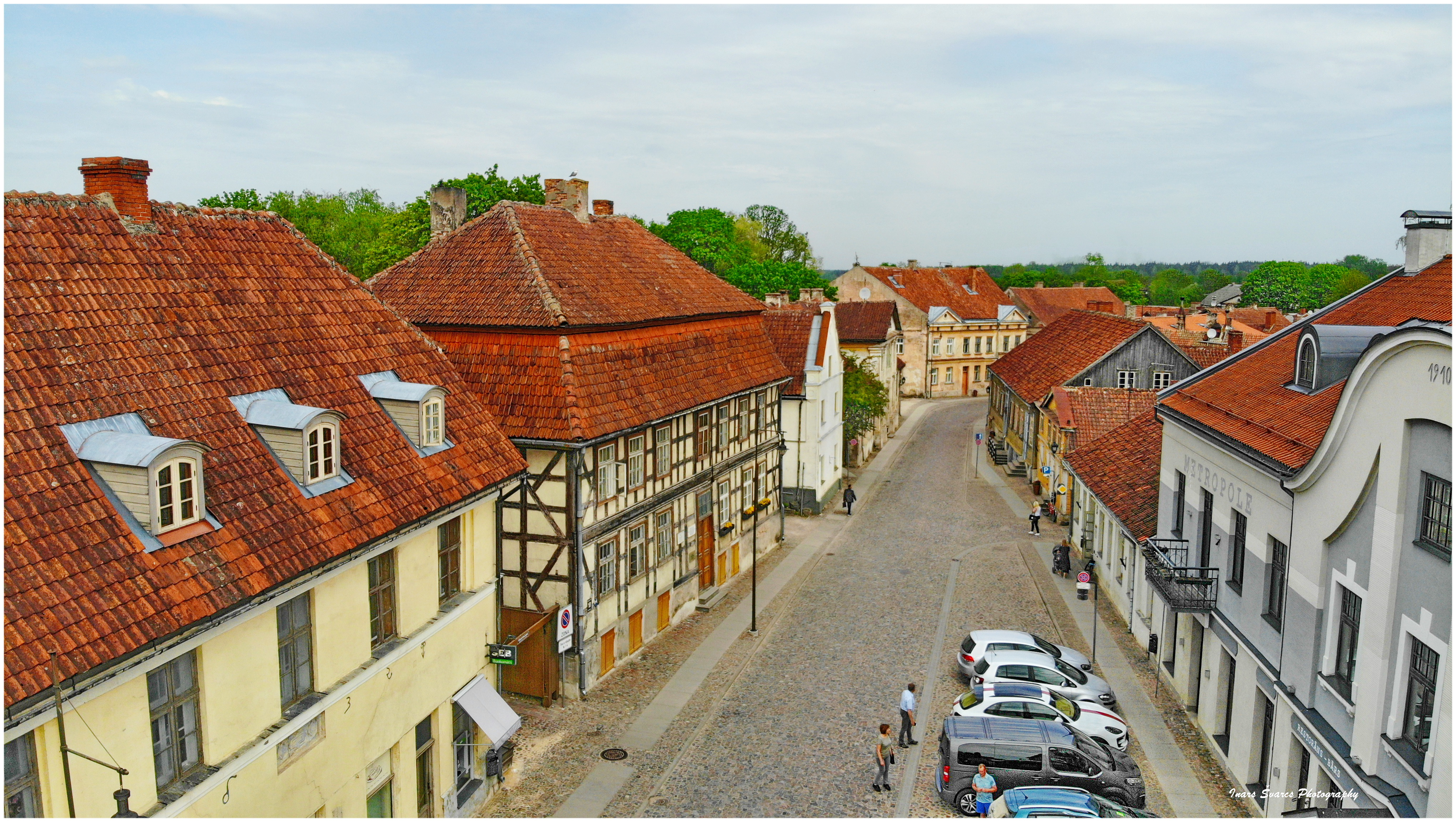
- Kuldīga Old Town

- Flag Coat of arms

- Location in Latvia
- Coordinates: 56°58′N 21°58′E
- Country: Latvia
- District: Kuldīga Municipality
- Town rights: 1378

Government
  - Mayor: Inese Astaševska

Area
  - Total: 13.24 km^{2} (5.11 sq mi)
  - Land: 12.49 km^{2} (4.82 sq mi)
  - Water: 0.75 km^{2} (0.29 sq mi)

Population (2026)
  - Total: 9,855
  - Density: 789.0/km^{2} (2,044/sq mi)
- Time zone: UTC+2 (EET)
  - Summer (DST): UTC+3 (EEST)
- Postal code: LV-330(1–3)
- Calling code: +371 633
- Number of city council members: 11
- Website: www.kuldiga.lv

UNESCO World Heritage Site
- Official name: Old town of Kuldīga
- Type: Cultural
- Criteria: v
- Designated: 2023
- Reference no.
- UNESCO region: Europe

Kuldīga (German: Goldingen) is a town in the Courland region of Latvia, in the western part of the country. It is the center of Kuldīga Municipality with a population of approximately 13,500.

Kuldīga was first mentioned in 1242. It joined the Hanseatic League in 1368. In the 17th century, Kuldīga (along with Jelgava) was one of the capitals of the Duchy of Courland from 1596 to 1616.

Kuldīga is an ancient town in Latvia's western region of Kurzeme with distinctive architecture, which is included in the list of the UNESCO's World Heritage Sites. Saint Catherine is believed to be the patron saint of Kuldīga, and the oldest church of the town is named after St Catherine. The foundation of the building was laid as early as in 1252. The church has been remodeled a number of times. The small River Alekšupīte runs through the very centre of the Kuldīga old town, along the walls of the houses. The Old Town around the small river itself is the only remaining 17th–18th-century ensemble of this kind in the Baltic states. A 4.2 metres high waterfall on the Alekšupīte is the highest in Latvia. The Venta Rapid, a 240-meter wide natural rapid on the Venta River, is the widest in Europe. Not far from the rapid is the Kuldīga brick bridge built in 1874, which is the longest bridge of this type in Europe.

Kuldīga was recognized as an EDEN destination in 2007.

== History ==
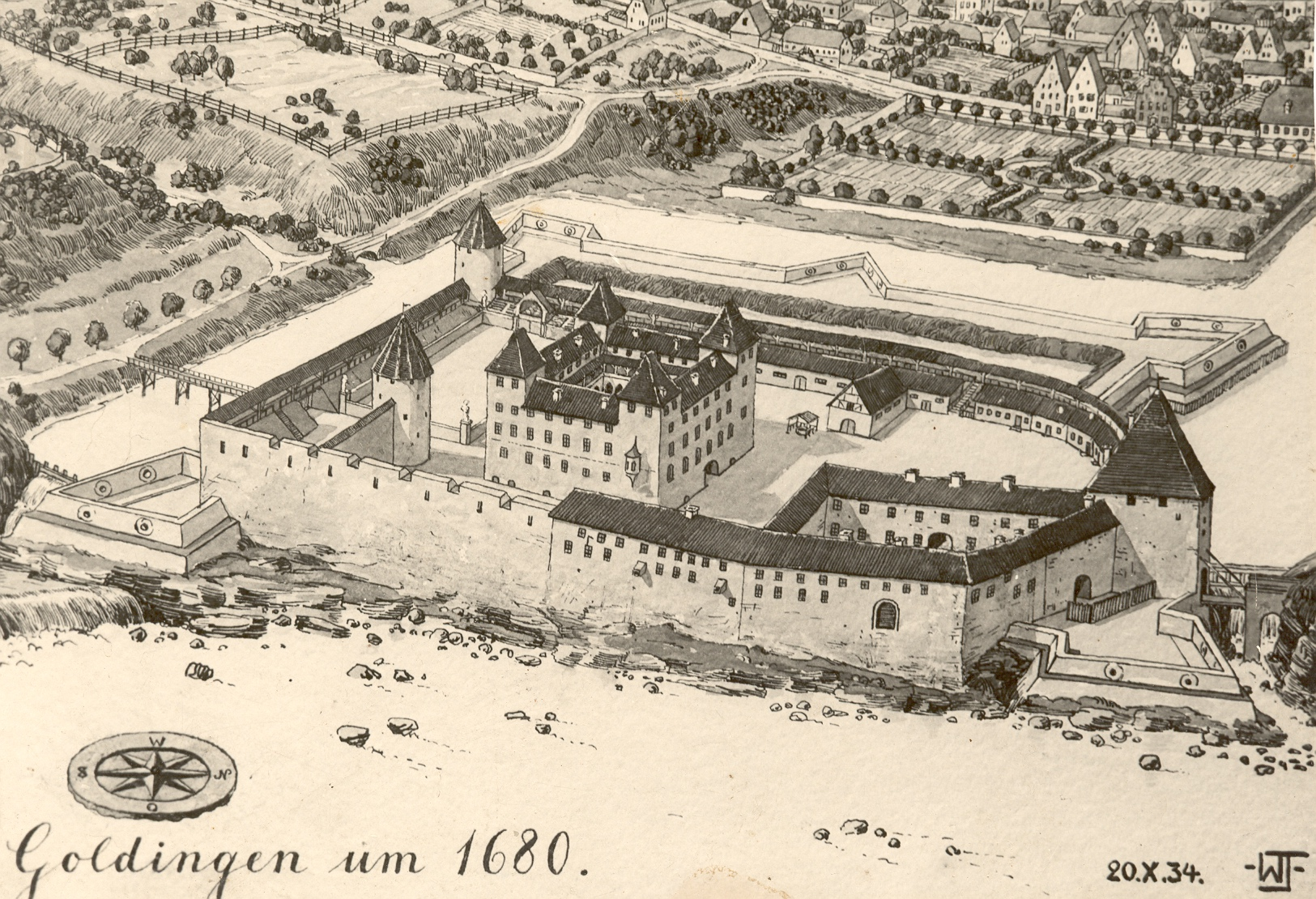
Kuldiga Castle in 1680

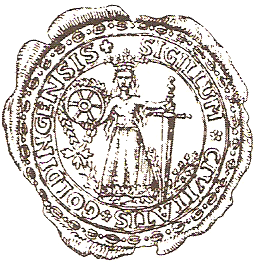
Coat of arms of Kuldīga, 1681

The origin of the ancient town Kuldīga can be explained by its location on the crossroads: the waterways of River Venta and land routes joining the Prussian lands with the lower reaches of River Daugava. The ancient Kuldiga town of Couronians – a fortified castle mound and a settlement were located 3,5 km to the North down the River Venta on its left bank. The castle mound can still be seen today. It is located on a bank of the River Venta on the foreland between the deep gully of the River Veckuldīga and the ancient valley of the Venta. The Site of the Castle itself is located in the several hectare wide area, but together with the Old City of Kuldiga – the area of more than ten hectares. There might have been a port by the River Veckuldīga.

On April 19, 1242 the Livonian Order of Knights received the master's permission to build a castle on the banks of River Venta. As this is the oldest preserved written document where Kuldiga is mentioned, it is considered to be the year of the foundation of Kuldiga. The Castle of the Livonian Order of Knights was built on the left bank of River Venta by the ford, and the dolomite from the riverbed was used as the construction material. In 1263, the castle and settlements around it were already mentioned as the town Goldingen, and its rights as for a town were based on Riga city rights.

On April 28, 1355, the Order's master Goswin von Herike allocated new land areas. At the same time he attributed a new privilege to the town, as well as a coat of arms with the image of St. Catherine. From 1439 Kuldiga/Goldingen was given a privilege to arrange a market weekly. The town was established by joining the three main populated areas: the town, the small village of the castle (town of the Couronians) and the village on the hill (so called "Kalnamiests" in Latvian) (in the area of Kalna iela today). The Komtur lived in the Castle of Livonian Order together with his twelve brothers being knights and with so-called stepbrothers who took care of the economic life. The Komtur also led the Komturei of Kuldiga, which had also Durbe, Sabile, Skrunda, Aizpute, Alsunga and Saldus along with Kuldiga in possession.

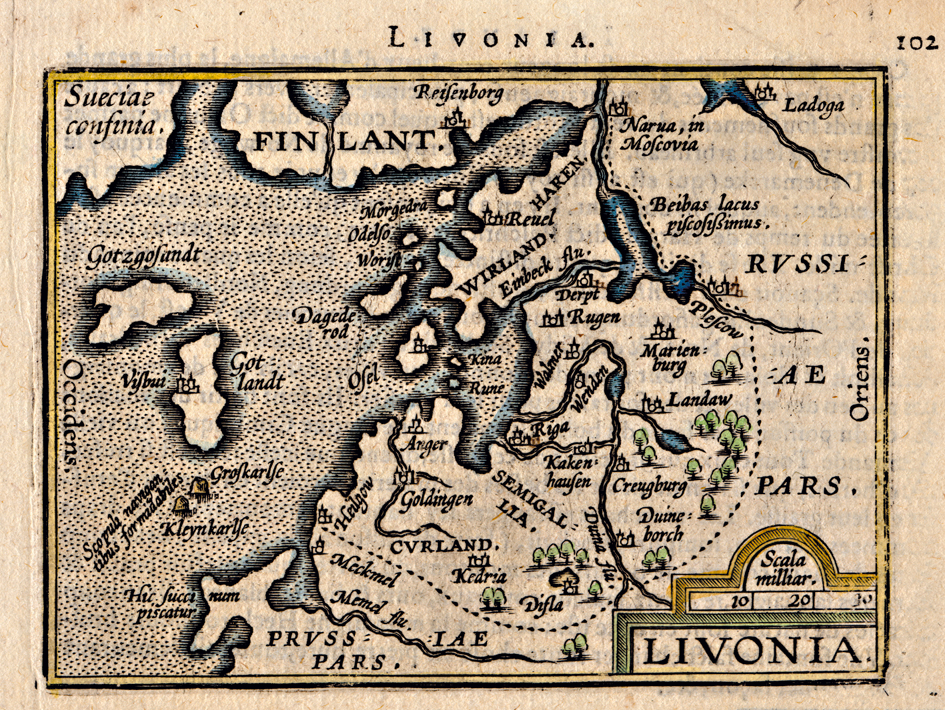
Kuldīga (Goldingen) marked in a 16th-17th-century map of Livonia

After establishing the Duchy of Courland and Semigallia in 1561, a new period began in the history of Kuldiga. The first duke Gotthard Kettler chose the former order castle to be one of his residences. He and later also other dukes approved the former town rights of Kuldiga by supporting its economic development. When the duke Gotthard died, the dukedom was divided into two parts and till 1618 Kuldiga was the residence of his youngest son Wilhelm and a capital of Kurzeme. The town profited from trading with Riga and Jelgava because of taxes on all goods taken across the bridge. In 1615, the bridge was destroyed by floods, causing a great loss to the town. In the same year, there was a huge fire destroying the major part of the wooden constructions in the town. After reconstruction of the town, a new market place was established (the Square of the City Council nowadays) and a new Town Hall was built (Baznīcas iela 5 nowadays), which we now name as the old one. So the centre of the town was moved from the old place nearby the St. Catherine's Church to the present Square of the City Council. The richest citizens and merchants built their houses around the new centre of the town. In the second part of the 19th century, small industrial companies began to be developed in the town. Some of them became factories with more than 100 workers. The largest factory in Kuldiga was the factory "Vulkāns" producing matches (established in 1878 and closed in 2004), and the label of matchboxes had an image of a deer on it. By 1896, Vulkāns was producing 58 million boxes of matches annually, supplying Latvia and exporting its products to Europe and Asia. The second largest was the factory of Vintelers Tūki. Furthermore things such as needles, cigars, soap, vodka, liqueurs and mineral water were produced in Kuldiga. Beer brewing was a tradition with deep roots – beer was brewed in the order castle, in the duke's manors and in the town as well. Many new buildings were built in this period – not only residential, but also municipal and public buildings. After several centuries, Kuldiga got a new bridge across the River Venta (1873–74), a new Town Hall was built (1868), the Orthodox Parish House and a church in Liepājas iela, a prison (which is a post office nowadays), the House of Latvian Society (which is the Centre for Culture nowadays), the German 'Gymnasium' (secondary school) in Kalna iela 19 and other buildings as well. Soon the number of local inhabitants doubled, reaching 13,000 just before World War I.

The town largely retains the street layout that developed during the Duchy period, while its architecture reflects influences introduced by foreign merchants and craftspeople from around the Baltic Sea.

During World War II, the town was under Soviet occupation from 1940, and then under German occupation from 1941 to 1944. However, the historic center of the town survived both wars and subsequent development.

== Sightseeing ==
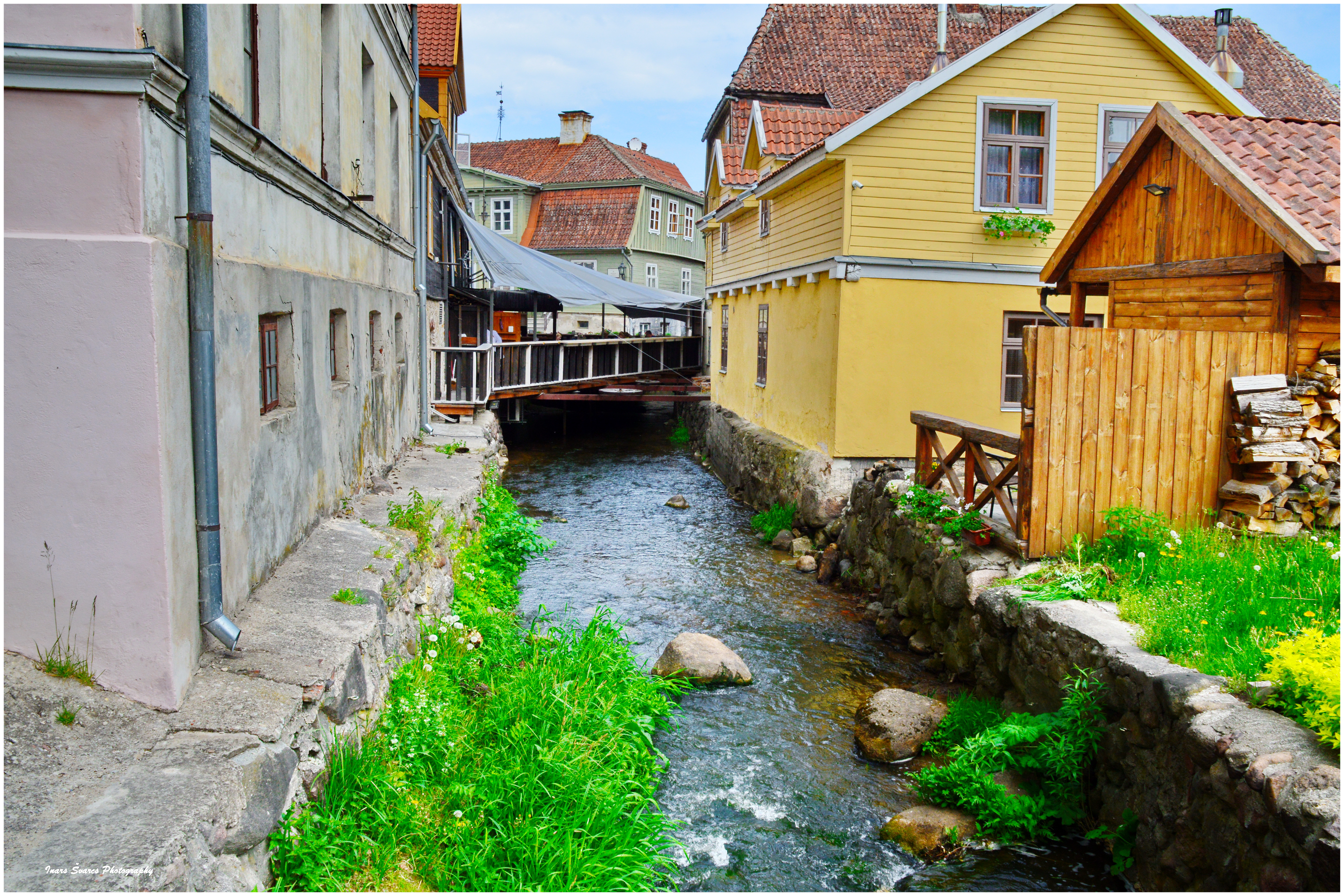
The Alekšupīte River canalled through Kuldīga

Kuldīga is a small and attractive town in Kurzeme which has always been admired and praised by poets and painters. The 'historical city centre, which developed in the 17th and 18th centuries, has still preserved the old wooden buildings which form small and narrow streets. The oldest wooden building in Kurzeme put up in 1670 can be found near the Town square. The Old Town hall was built in the 17th century. The town square, since the very origins of the settlement, was a place where townspeople used to gather. The tradition has survived: the pulse of the town is best felt in the central square, a venue for weavers' exhibitions, traditional festivities and other events.

The Venta waterfall (Ventas rumba) is the widest waterfall in Europe. This 240 meter wide naturally formed waterfall is associated with a number of legends and historic events. In spring, one can watch the fish jumping up the ledge; due to this, Kuldīga was once famous as a "place where they catch salmon in the air".

The old brick bridge across the Venta was built in 1874 and is the longest bridge of this kind in Europe – 164 m. It was built according to 19th century standards – 500 feet long and 26 feet wide, allowing two carriages to pass each other. It consists of seven spans of brick vaults. During World War I two of the spans were blown up. The 'race of the naked' over the bridge has become an annual tradition for Midsummer nights.

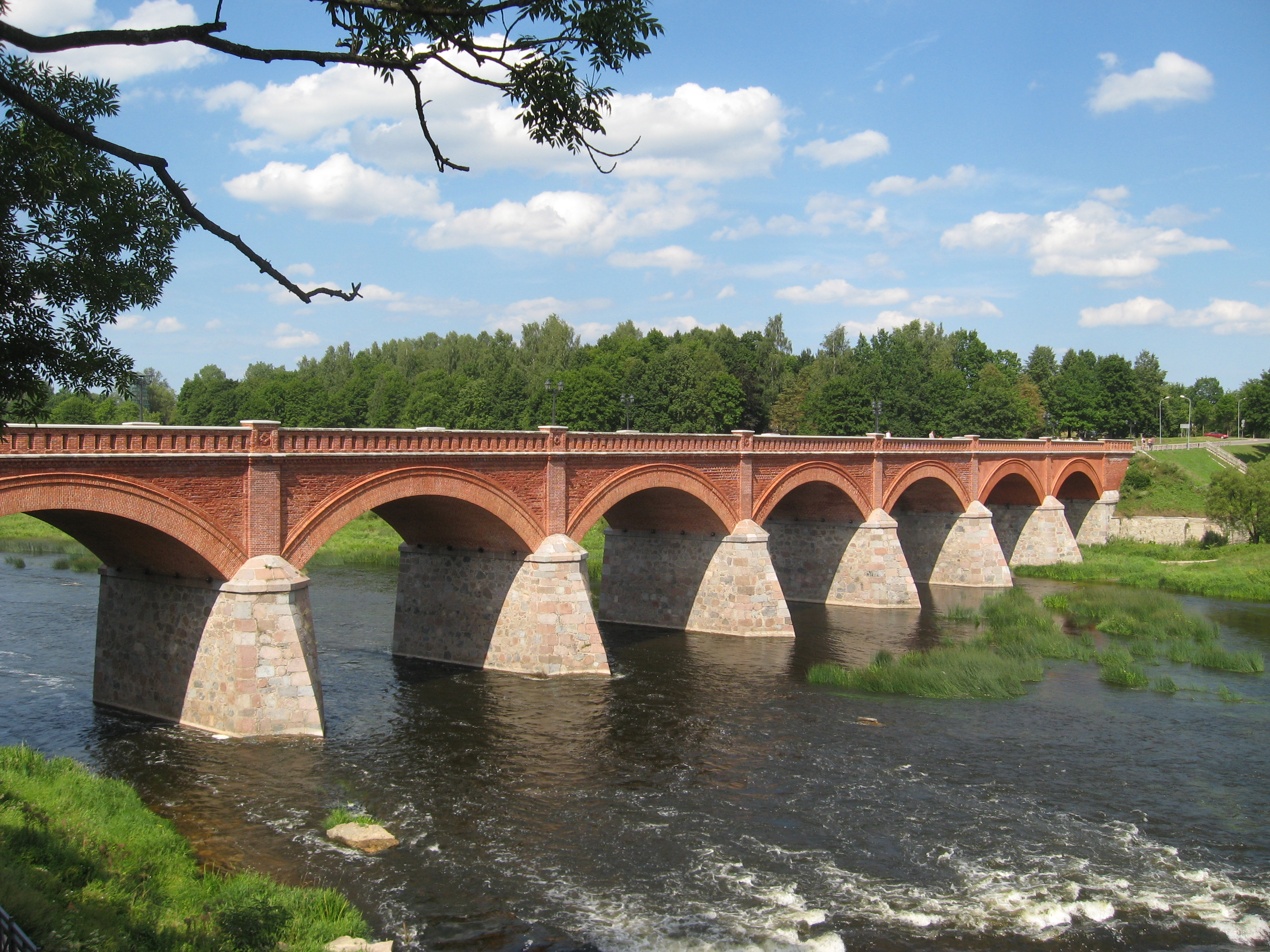
Brick bridge across river Venta

The Alekšupīte River flows directly along the walls of many buildings which is why Kuldīga has been called the Venice of Latvia. Initially the buildings of the town centre were constructed as the suburb of Kuldīga. In 1701, during the Great Northern War, the Swedish army invaded Kuldīga Castle and in 1709 it became uninhabitable, but in the 19th century the castle ruins were relocated.

Alekšupīte Waterfall was created in the 17th century to use the stream to operate the first paper mill in Kurzeme. An annual race is held on the Alekšupīte, when the contestants run directly along the river bottom.

St Catherine's Church was originally built in 1252. However, it was built anew with baroque style wood carvings on the altar. The church was given the name of St Catherine, the patroness of the town. One of the most successful rulers of the Duchy of Courland, Duke Jacob was baptized in this church, and his wedding to Princess Louise Charlotte of Brandenburg also took place here.

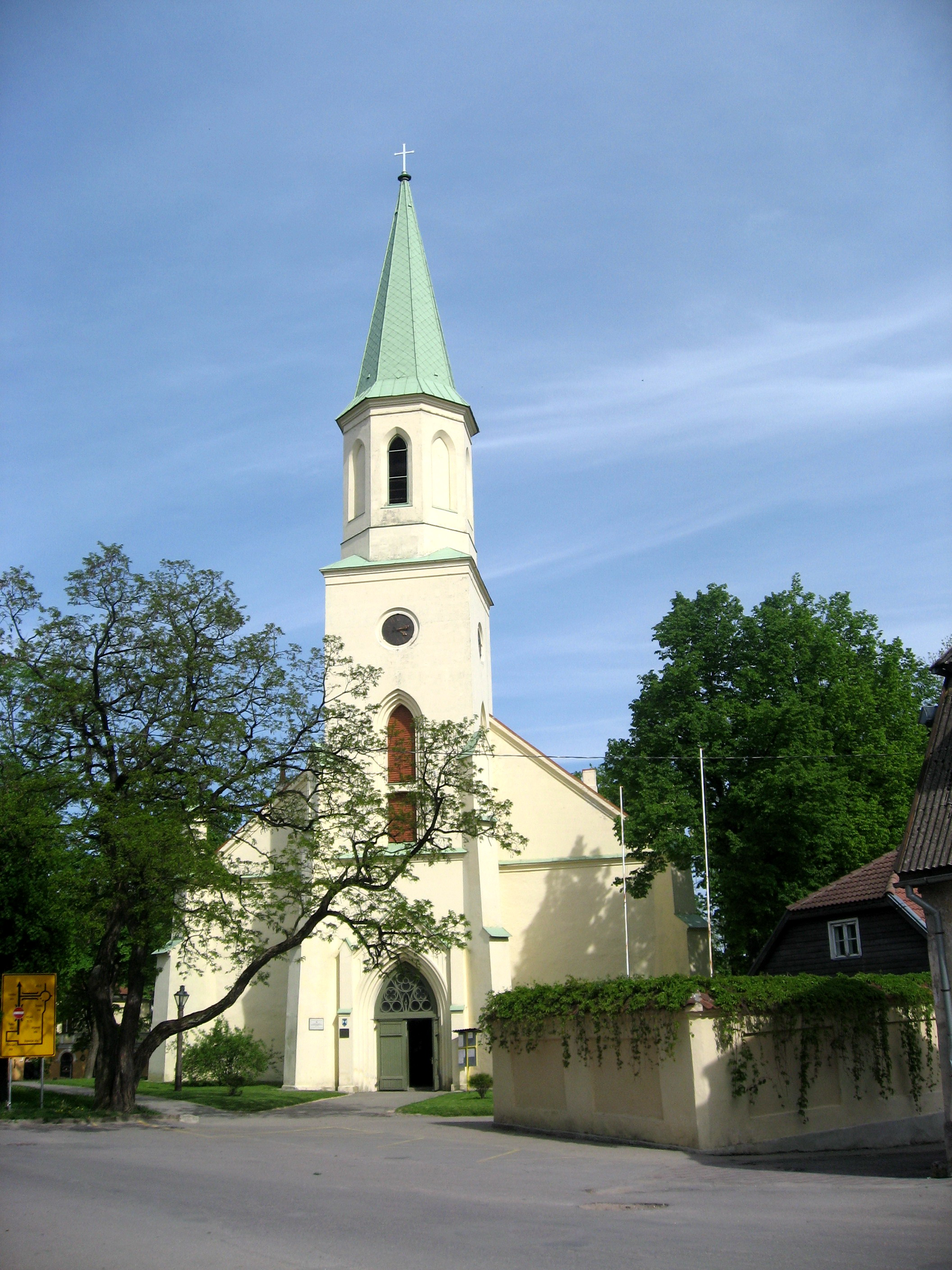
St. Catherine Church

Liepājas street is a pedestrian street with several 17th–20th-century buildings, interesting doors and special windows.

Sculptress Livija Rezevska's sculpture museum was founded in 2003. The visitors may see more than 15 sculptures characterizing Latvian nation, its strength, unity and love.

The Riežupe Sand Caves make up the longest cave labyrinth in Latvia (about 2 km total, 460 m can be toured). During Duke Jacob's reign the sand from Riežupe sand caves was taken by ships abroad for glass production.

=== Synagogue ===
One of the largest buildings in Kuldiga (1905 street 6) known for its marble interior with gilded details, is the former Jewish synagogue. It was built during the reign of the tsar Alexander II and was the centre of a vibrant Jewish community. The synagogue was part of a larger complex with an adjacent prayer house, the Jewish sepulchre, and Jewish school, which can still be seen today. After WWII it was used as a grain warehouse, then a cinema, and in 2009-2011 was restored and converted into a library and performance space.

== Gallery ==
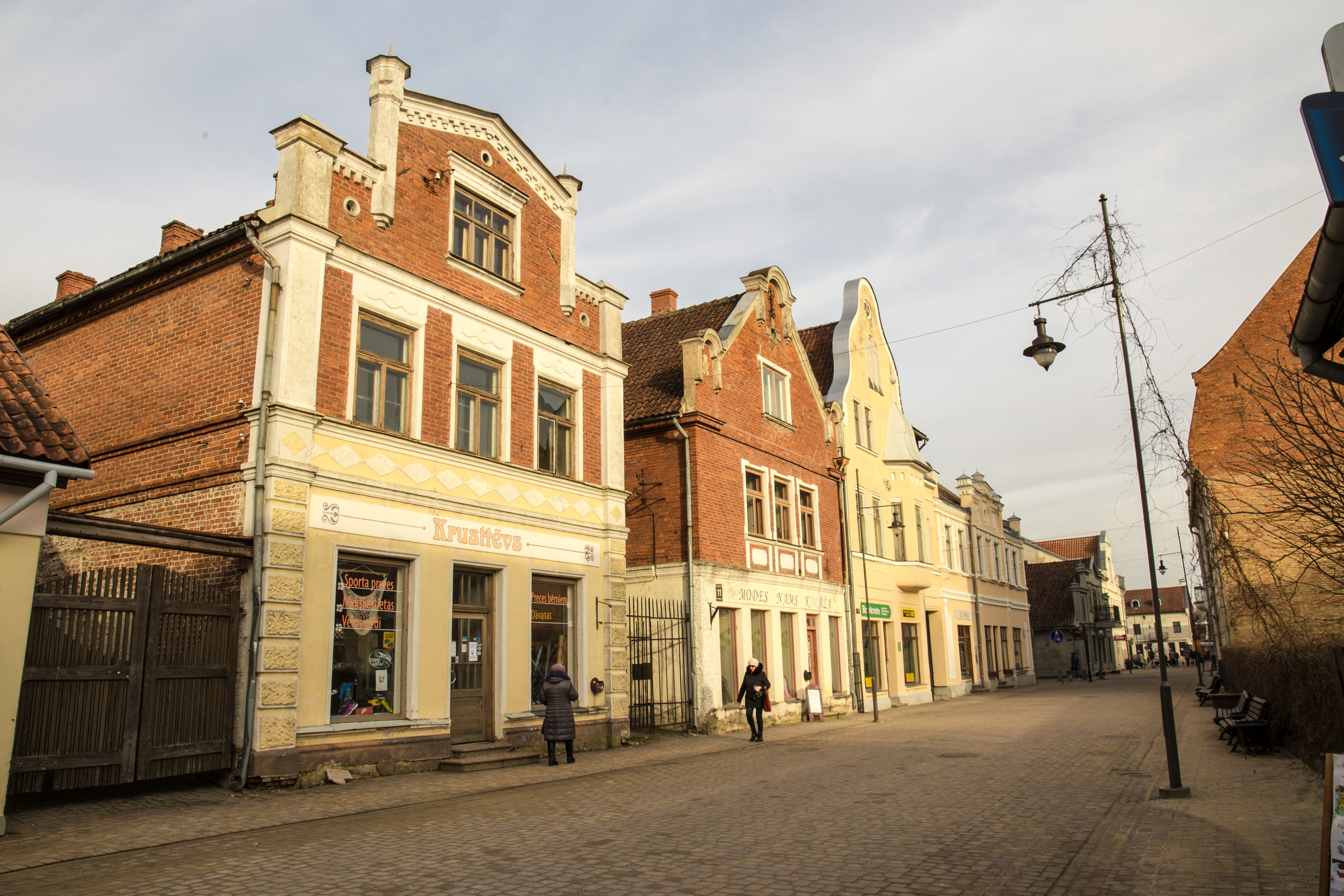
Street in Kuldīga old town

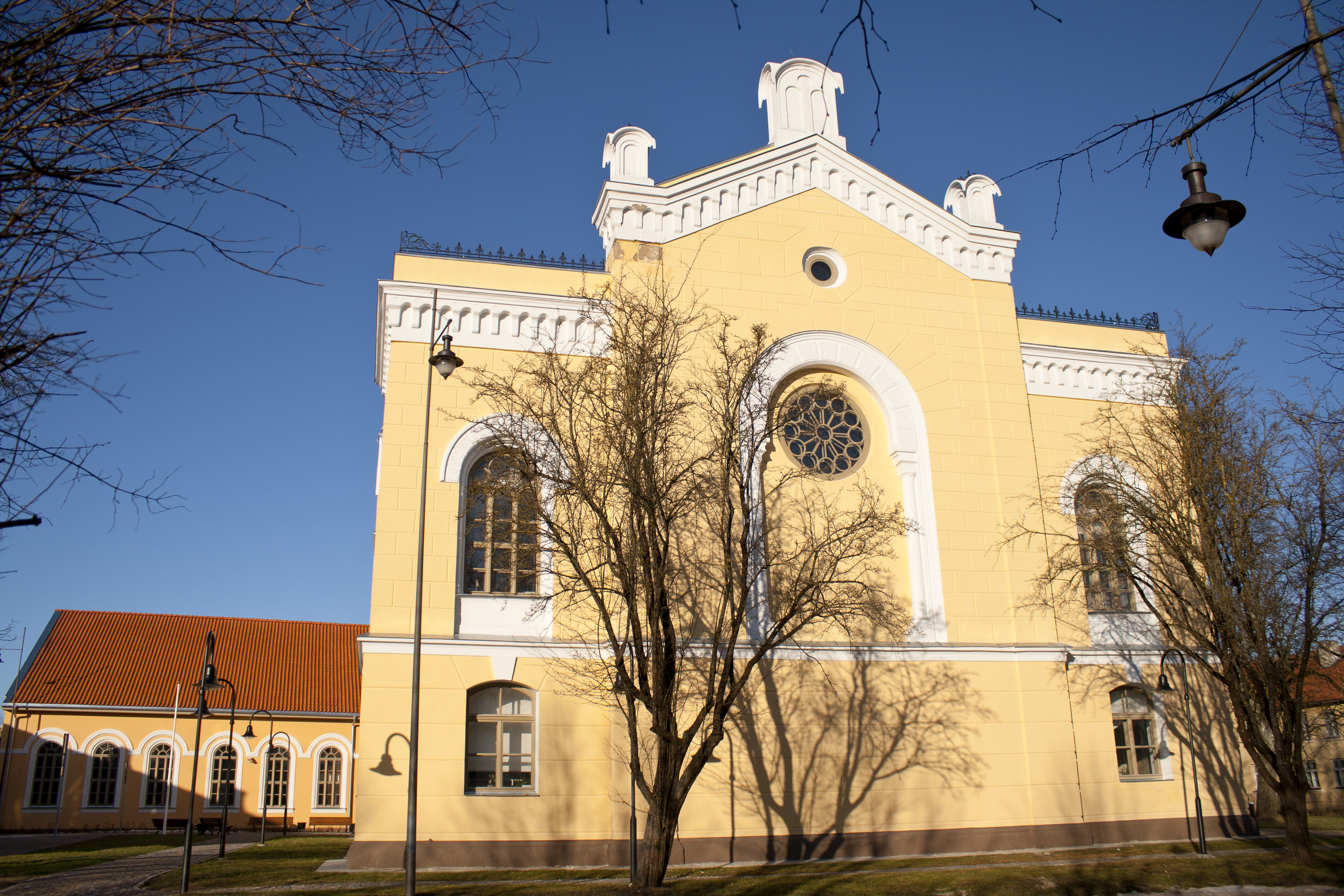
Former synagogue, now a library in Kuldīga.

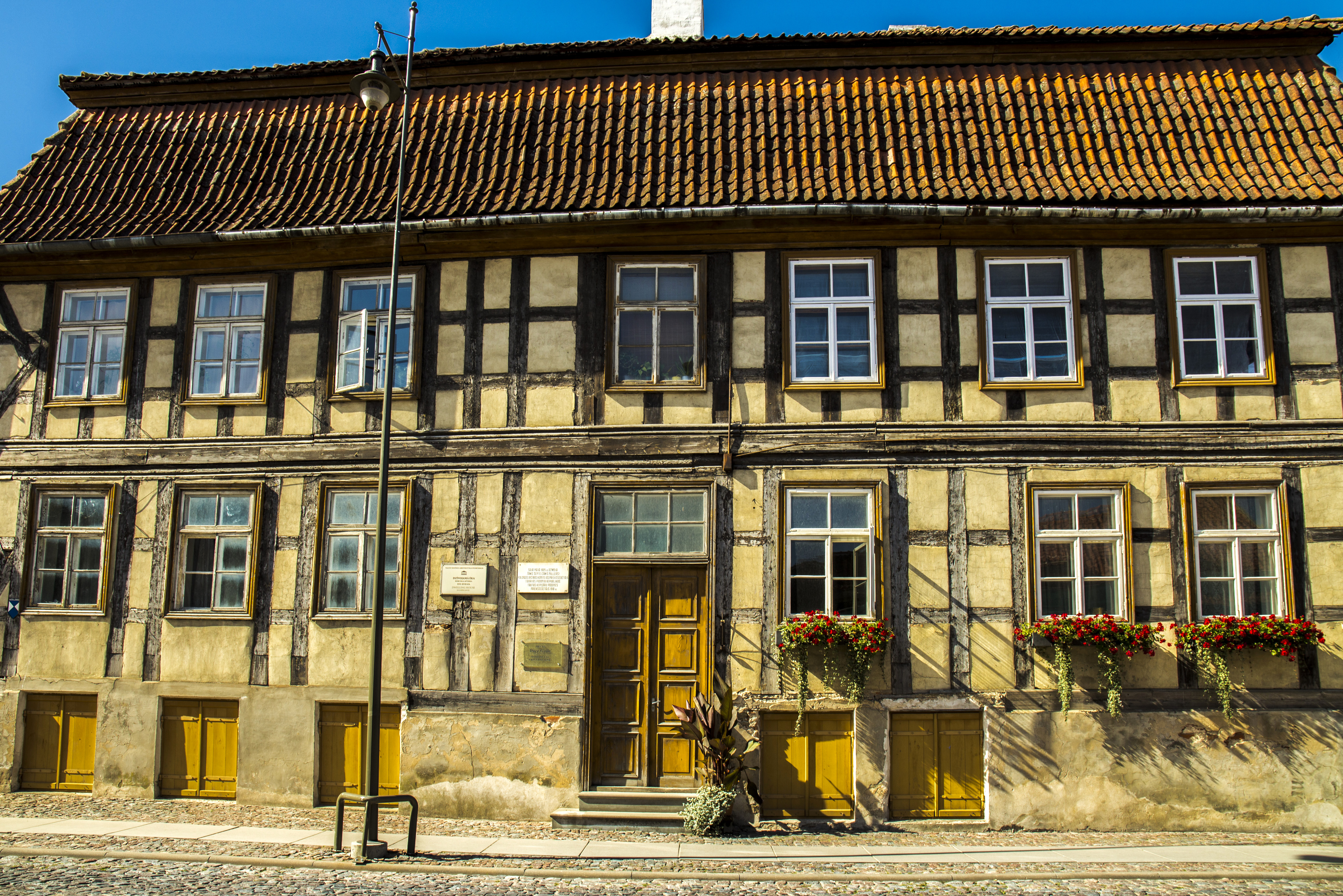
Former Duke's Pharmacy

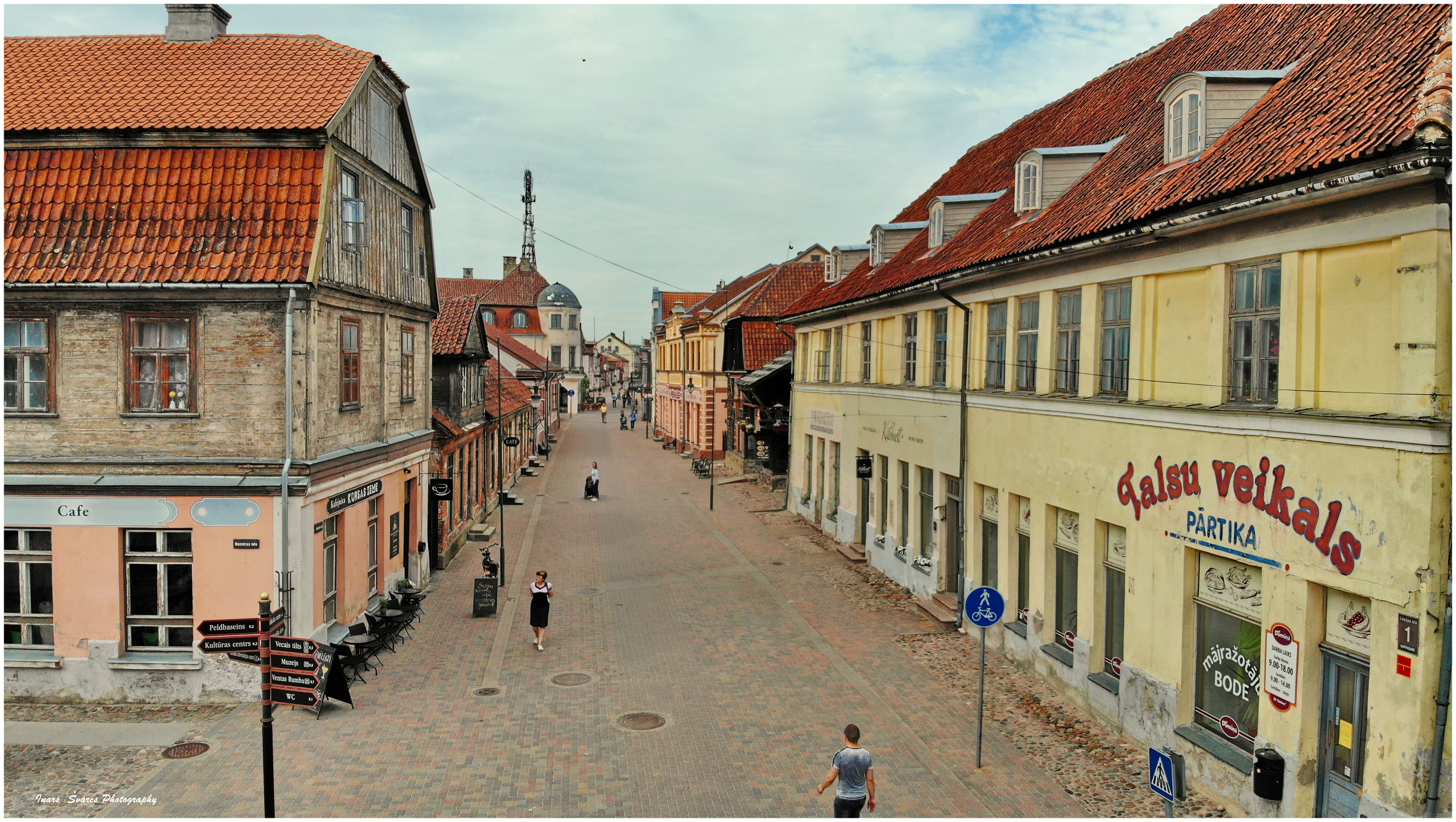
Street in Kuldīga

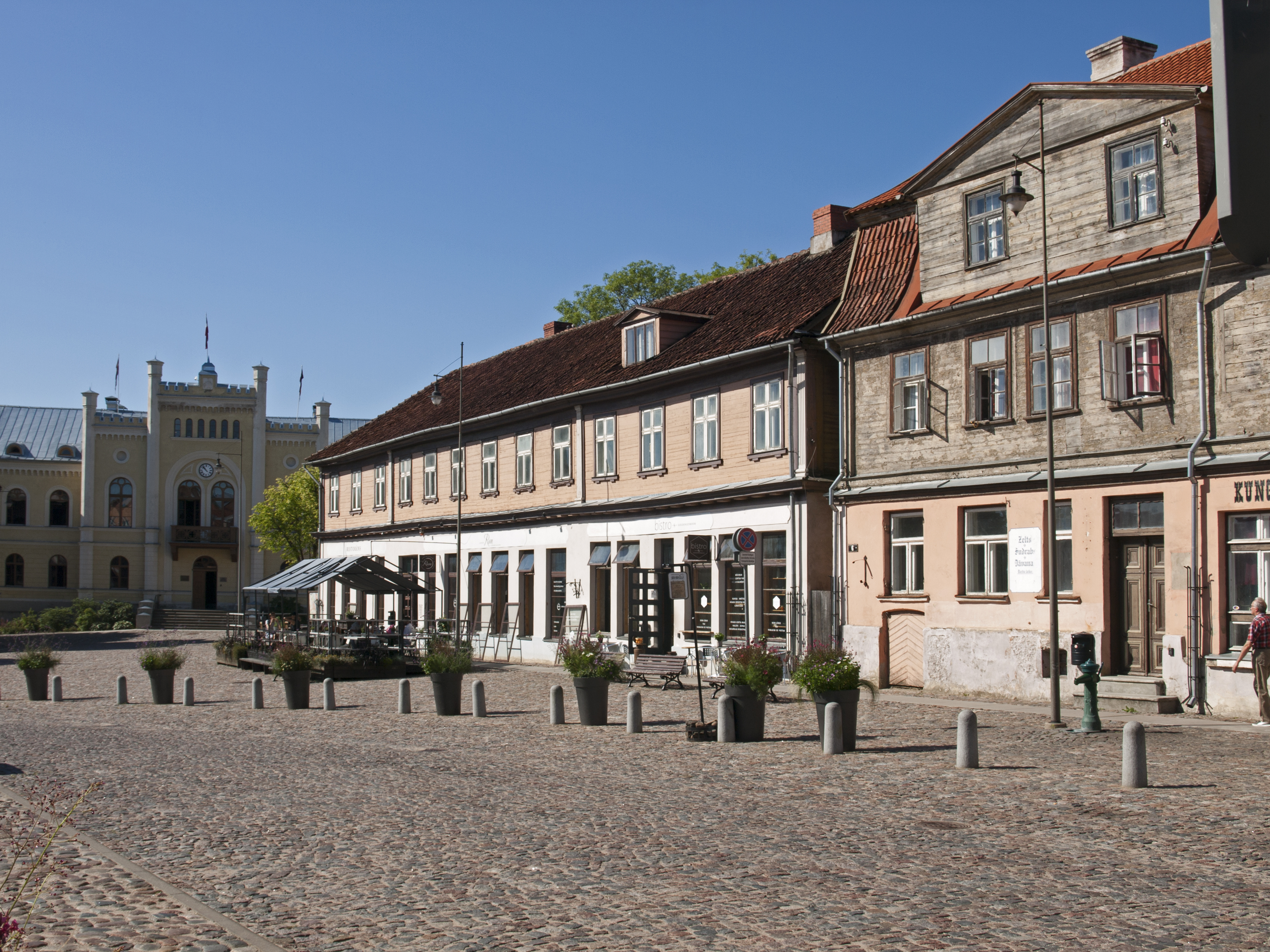
Old architecture with town hall in background

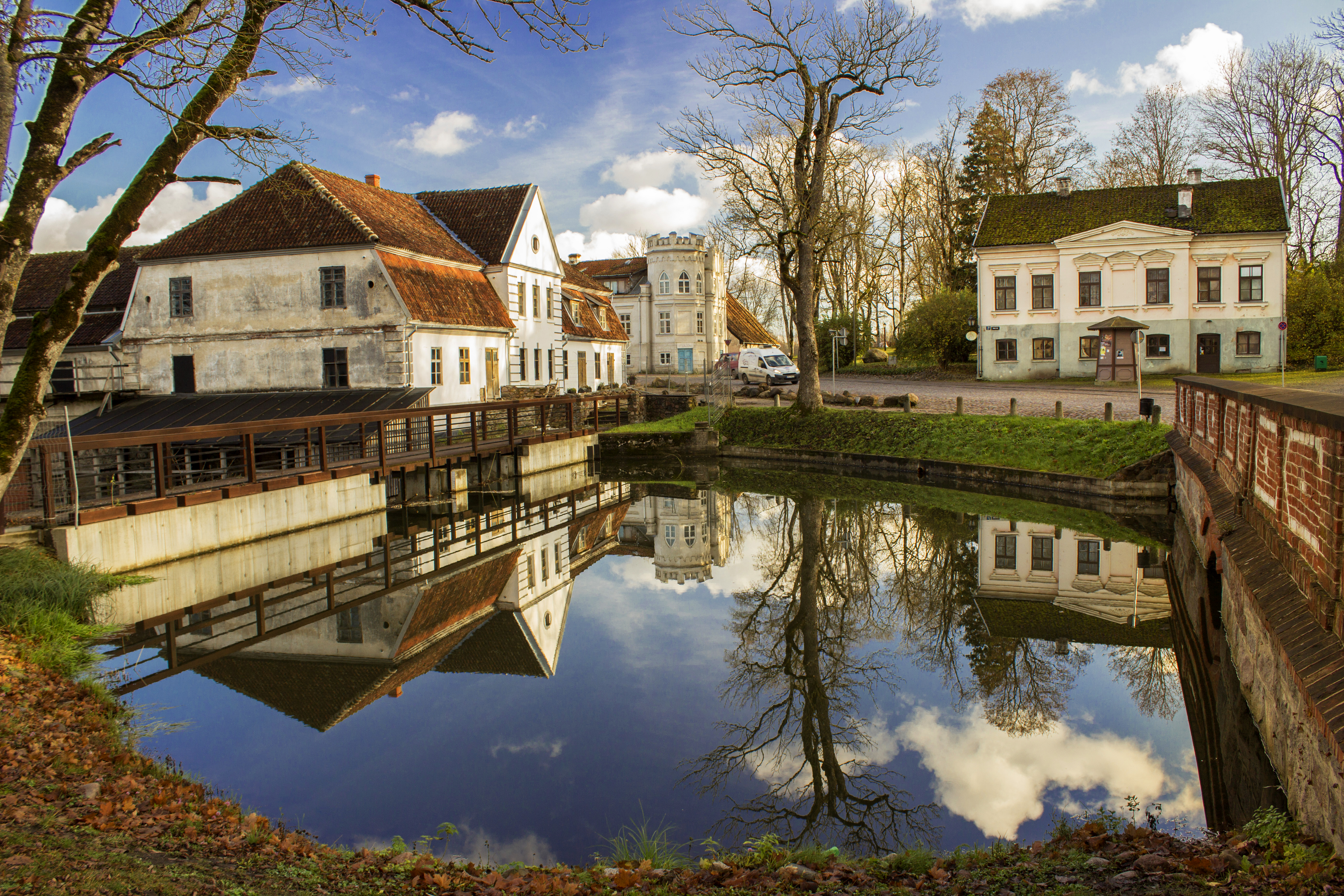
Kuldīga Castle watermill

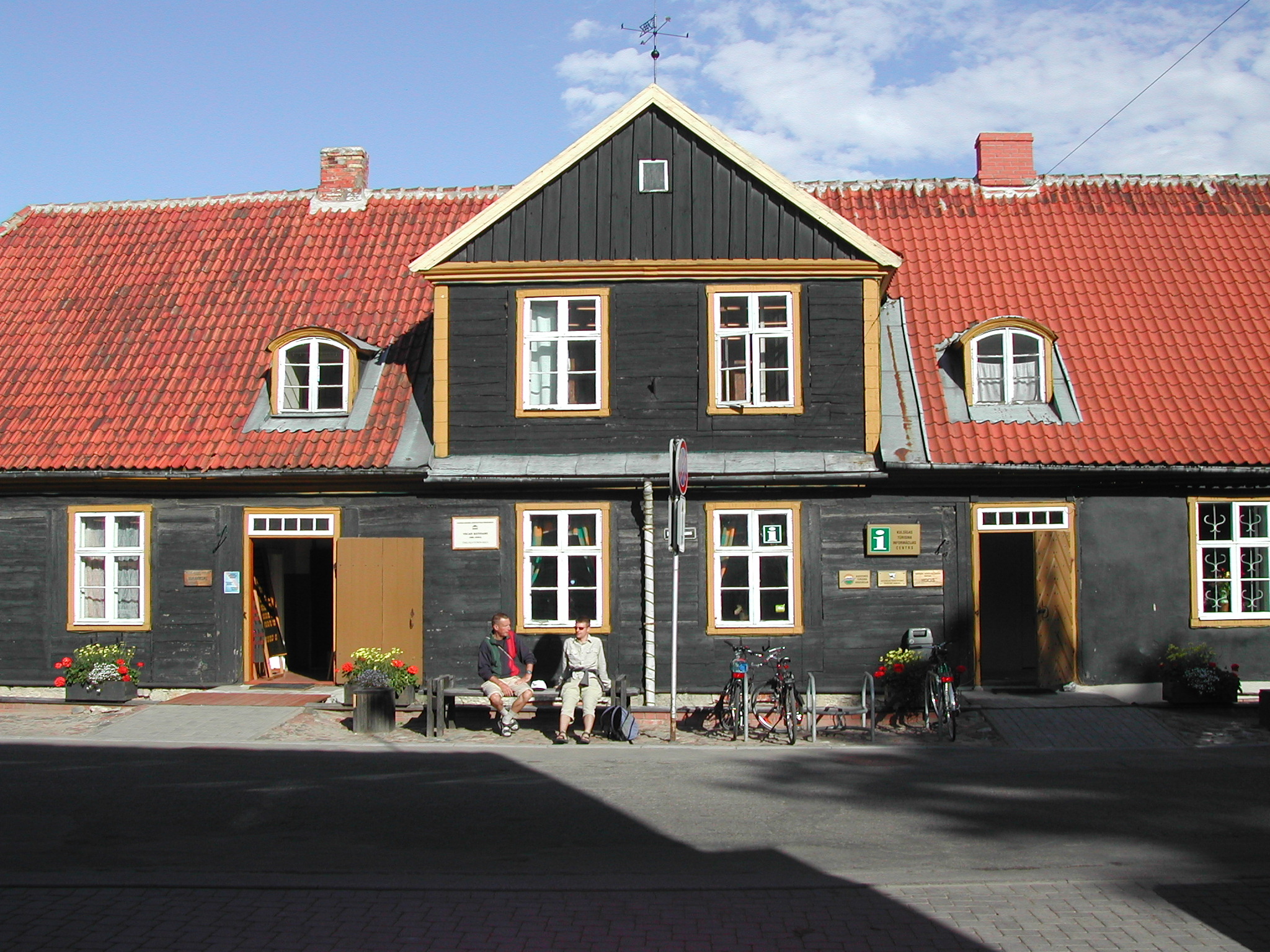
Tourist information centre in Kuldīga

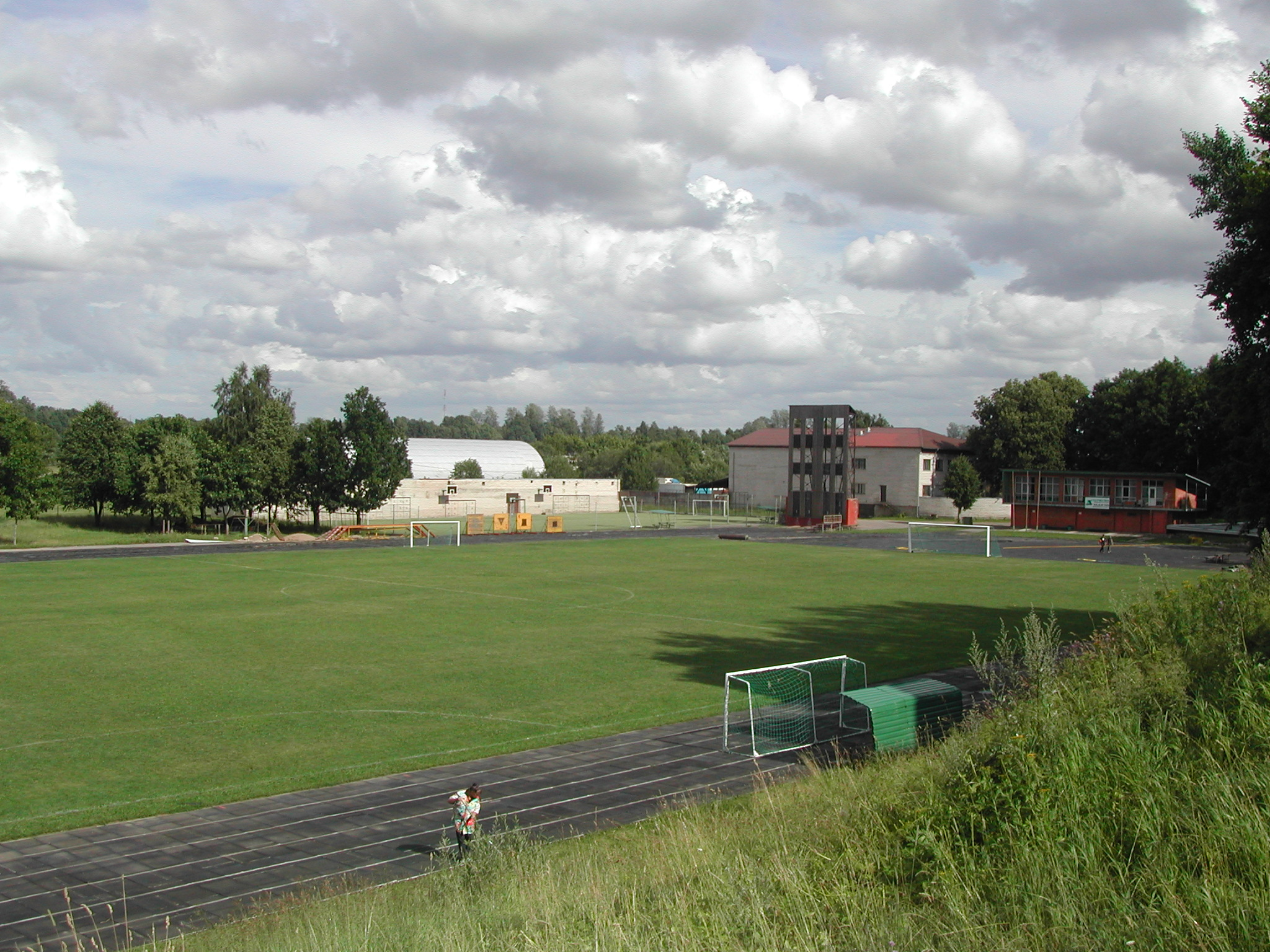
Kuldīga stadium

== Sports ==
Kuldīga Half Marathon – an annual road marathon is held in Kuldīga since 2006.

Latvia's first indoor arena for athletics was opened in Kuldīga in 2008.

Currently there is a football team called Goldingen United (Home stadium A.Grundmaņa stadions). They're currently resided in Latvia's 3rd division (Dali Dali 3.līga).

== Notable people ==
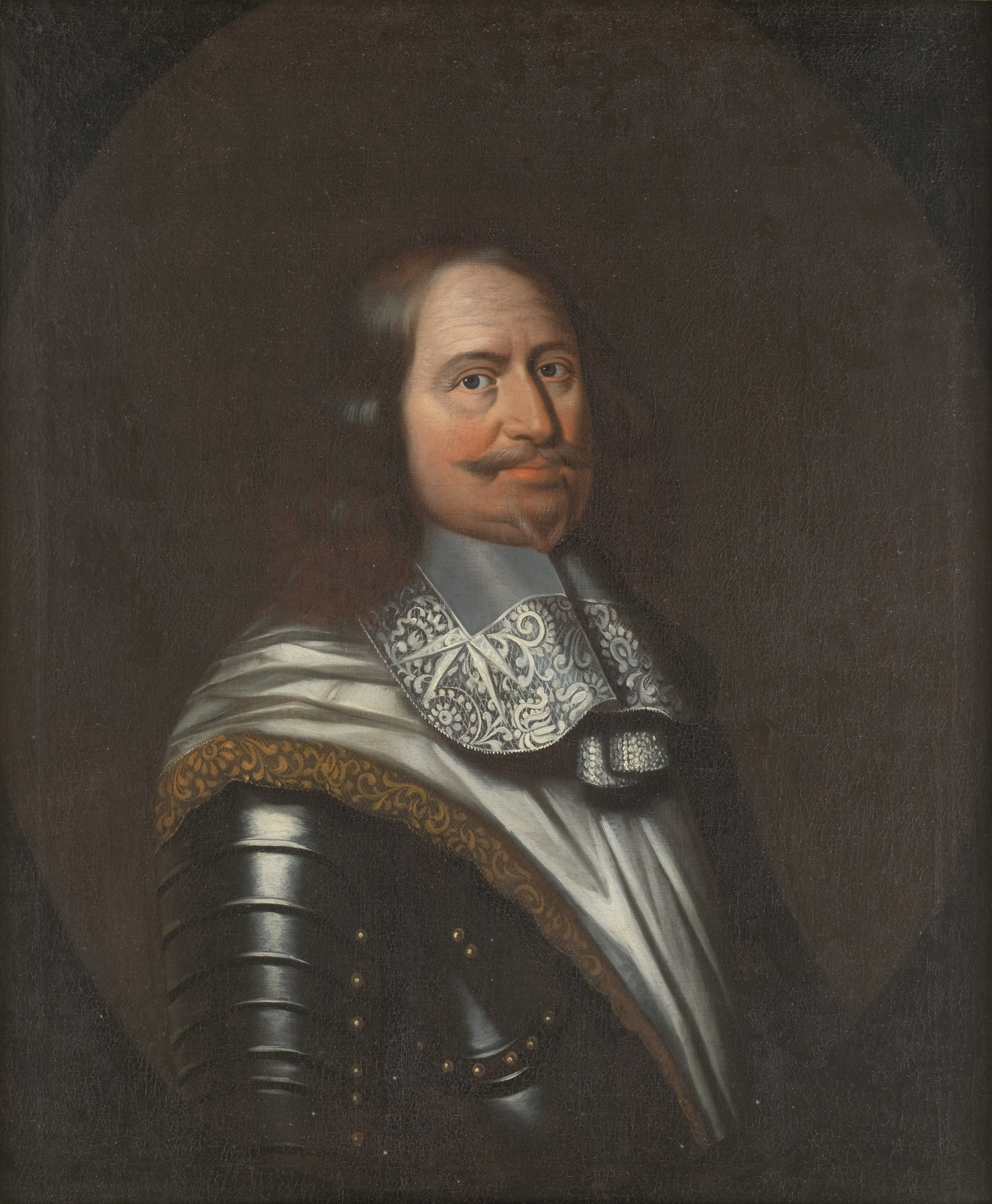
Jacob Kettler

- Jacob Kettler (1610–1682), the Duke of Courland and Semigallia
- Karl Davydov (1838–1889), Russian cellist, called the "czar of cellists" by Pyotr Ilyich Tchaikovsky
- James Martin Eder (1838-1921), pioneer of the sugar industry in Colombia
- Zelig Kalmanovich (1885–1944), Jewish philologist, translator and historian
- Ben-Zion Harel (1892–1972), Israeli doctor, politician
- Sergei Tretyakov (1892–1937), constructivist writer, playwright and poet
- Max Weinreich (1894–1969), linguist, specializing in sociolinguistics and Yiddish
- Aivis Ronis (born 1968), politician and diplomat, Minister for Foreign Affairs, 2010 and Minister for Transport, 2011 to 2013.
- Dana Reizniece-Ozola (born 1981), politician and chess player, Minister of Economics, 2014–2016 and Minister of Finance, 2016–2019

=== Sport ===
- Jānis Miņins (born 1980), bobsledder, competed at the 2006 Winter Olympics
- Jānis Šmēdiņš (born 1987), beach volleyball player, team bronze medallist at the 2012 Olympic Games
- Dāvis Ikaunieks (born 1994), footballer who has played 290 games and 43 for Latvia
- Roberts Ozols (born 1995), footballer, played about 200 games and 19 for Latvia
- Jānis Ikaunieks (born 1995) footballer, played 290 games and 73 for Latvia

== Twin towns – sister cities ==
Kuldīga is twinned with:

- Drøbak, Norway
- Geesthacht, Germany
- (Georgia (country)) Mtskheta, Georgia

== See also ==
- Kuldīga Half Marathon
- Kuldiga Castle
