= Almāle =

Village in Latvia

Coordinates: 56°59′N 21°38′E

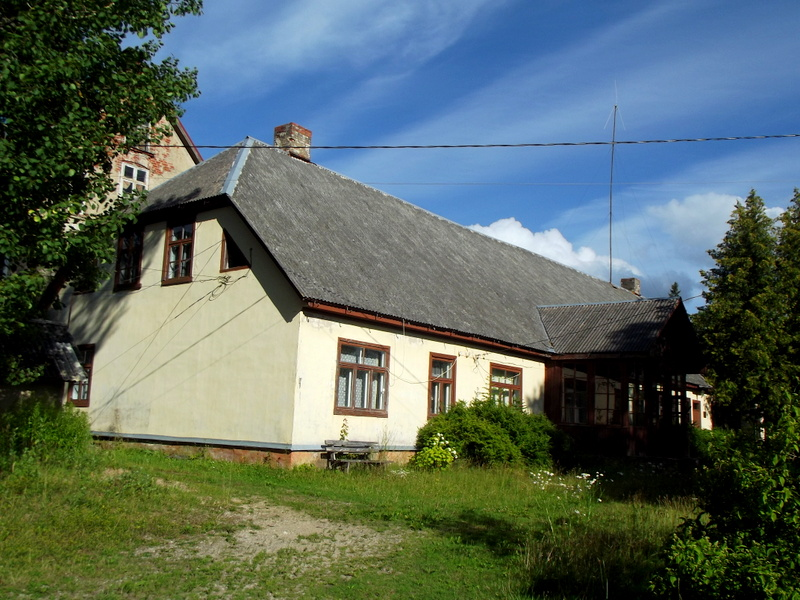
Almāle manor

Almāle is a village in Alsunga Parish, Kuldīga Municipality in the Courland region of Latvia.
