= Venta Rapid =

Waterfall in Latvia

Ventas Rumba
- IUCN category III (natural monument or feature)
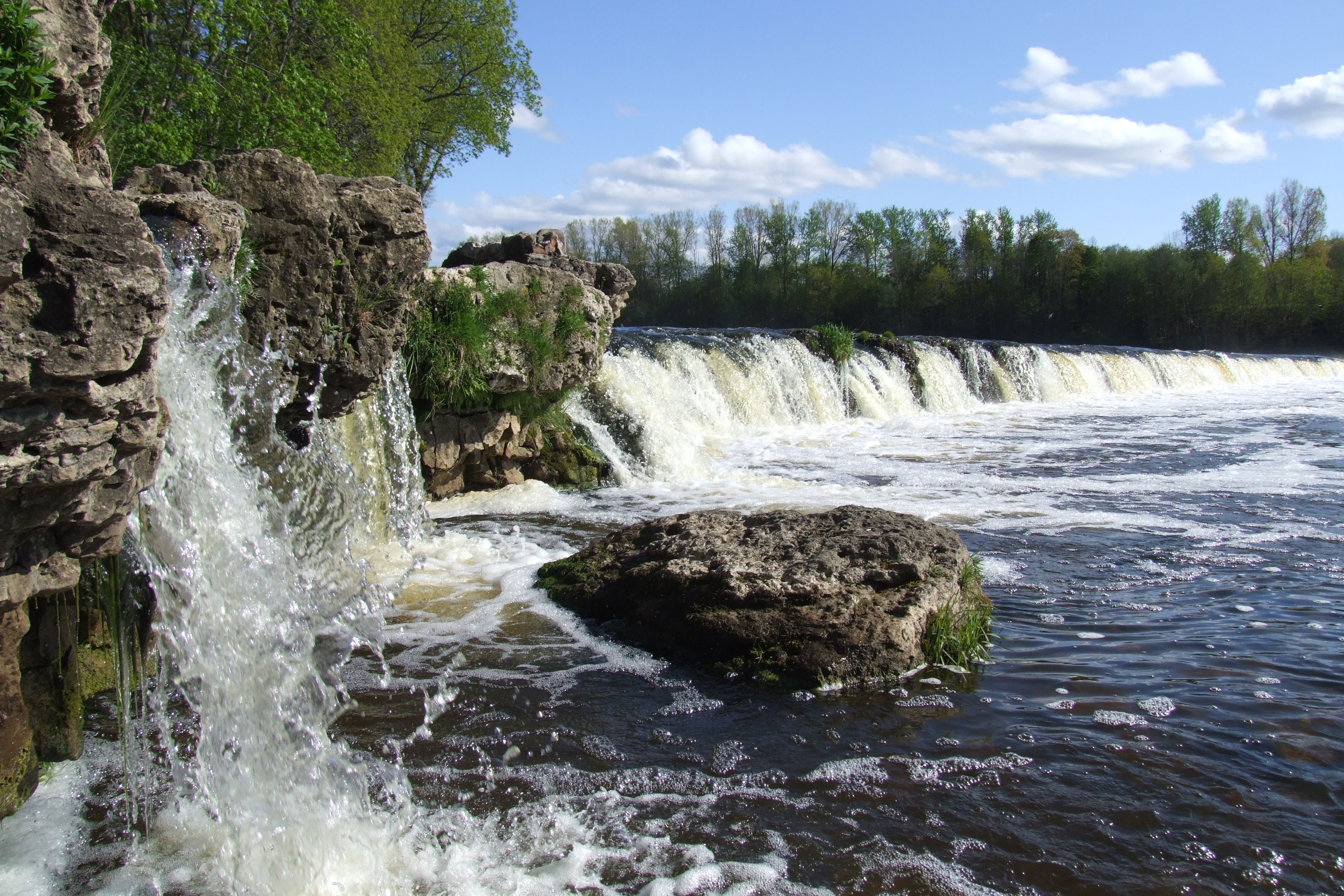
- Venta Rapid

- Location within Latvia
- Location: Latvia
- Nearest city: Kuldīga
- Coordinates: 56°58′04.7″N 21°58′44.3″E
- Area: 0.1 km^{2} (0.039 sq mi)
- Established: 1977
- Governing body: Ministry of Environmental Protection and Regional Development

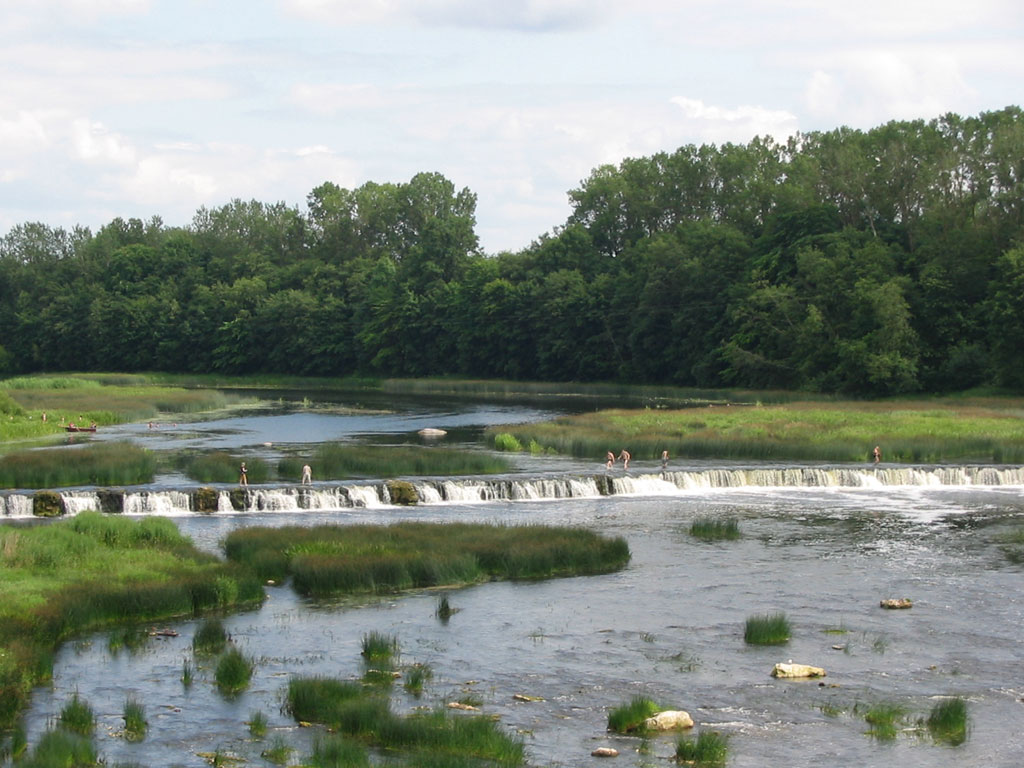
Venta rapid

Venta Rapid (Latvian: Ventas rumba) is a waterfall on the Venta River in Kuldīga, western Latvia. It is the widest waterfall in Europe at 249 metres (817 ft) across, and becomes as wide as 275 metres (902 ft) during spring floods. The height of the falls varies from 1.80 to 2.20 metres (5 ft 11 in to 7 ft 3 in) depending on the level of water in the river.

== Geology ==
The waterfall is formed by Devonian dolomite and its formation is due to the difference in hardness of mineral between its lower and upper parts. Below, it is more brittle and erodes faster, leaving the top layer to hang over it. These upper, more convex parts sometimes collapse and fall into the river. As a result, the waterfall slowly recedes, and since the flow in the central zone is more powerful, the middle of the waterfall gradually retreats higher upstream compared to its sides.

== History ==
The town of Kuldiga was established here because the falls formed an obstacle on the Venta medieval inland shipping route. In the middle of the 17th century, Duke of Courland Jacob Kettler planned to dig a bypass to avoid the waterfall. Excavation started on the right bank of the river, but the idea was abandoned because the dolomite was too hard and the work was too slow and difficult. Only in the spring does high water enter the shallow canal, forming the island of Martin. According to legend, the Duke ordered the waterfall demolished by explosion. After the first blast, large stone blocks dislodged and the waterfall simply changed its edge line. The power of the blast cracked the walls of the Duke's palace, which was close to the river, and the Duke gave up the idea.

In the 19th century Russia had plans to create a network of canals to unite all the seas of its European part. The idea was to create waterways between the Baltic Sea and the Black Sea across the Venta, Neman and Dnieper rivers. To implement these plans, Turkish prisoners of war were commandeered to build a canal. However it was quickly discovered that the dolomite bedrock was too hard to dig. In addition, Venta river was found not to be wide and deep enough for shipping. Construction was discontinued in 1831, however the canal was dug around the waterfall 30 years later. The remains of this canal are still visible today.

== Fishing ==
In about 1640, Jacob Kettler devised an interesting way of fishing. He ordered 100 large wicker baskets, and had fishing weirs carved into the bedrock. During seasonal spawning, salmon and sturgeon attempted to overcome the height of the waterfall by jumping into the air. The fish that failed to overcome the waterfall were swept by the current back into the canals and ended up in the hanging baskets. Later, enterprising fishermen begin to rent a few metres of the waterfall, placed their baskets, and waited for them to fill up with fresh catch. Typical catch was about 80–100 fish and was a good supplement to an annual income. Kuldīga used to be called 'the town where one can catch salmon in the air'. The salmon and sturgeon in the river disappeared long ago, and in 1892 the last sturgeon was caught.

Nowadays, mostly the vimba is fished. However, fishing is prohibited during the spawning season.

== Legends ==
Folk legend tells the origin of the waterfall as follows. At the location where the Kata Hut now stands, once lived a sorcerer who was angry with the devil himself and intended to take revenge. The Devil used to sleep at the sorcerer's hut, and each night he would collect a bag of stones and fly across the Venta. But the sorcerer made a rooster crow its morning song, causing all of the village roosters to sing too. The devil was frightened and spilled his stones across the river, forming the threshold of the waterfall.

Another legend attributes the formation of the waterfall to the work Livonian Knights, who mined the stones for the construction of castles. The stones were indeed mined, but much later, at the time of the Duke of Courland, in an insignificant amount.

== Tourist attractions ==
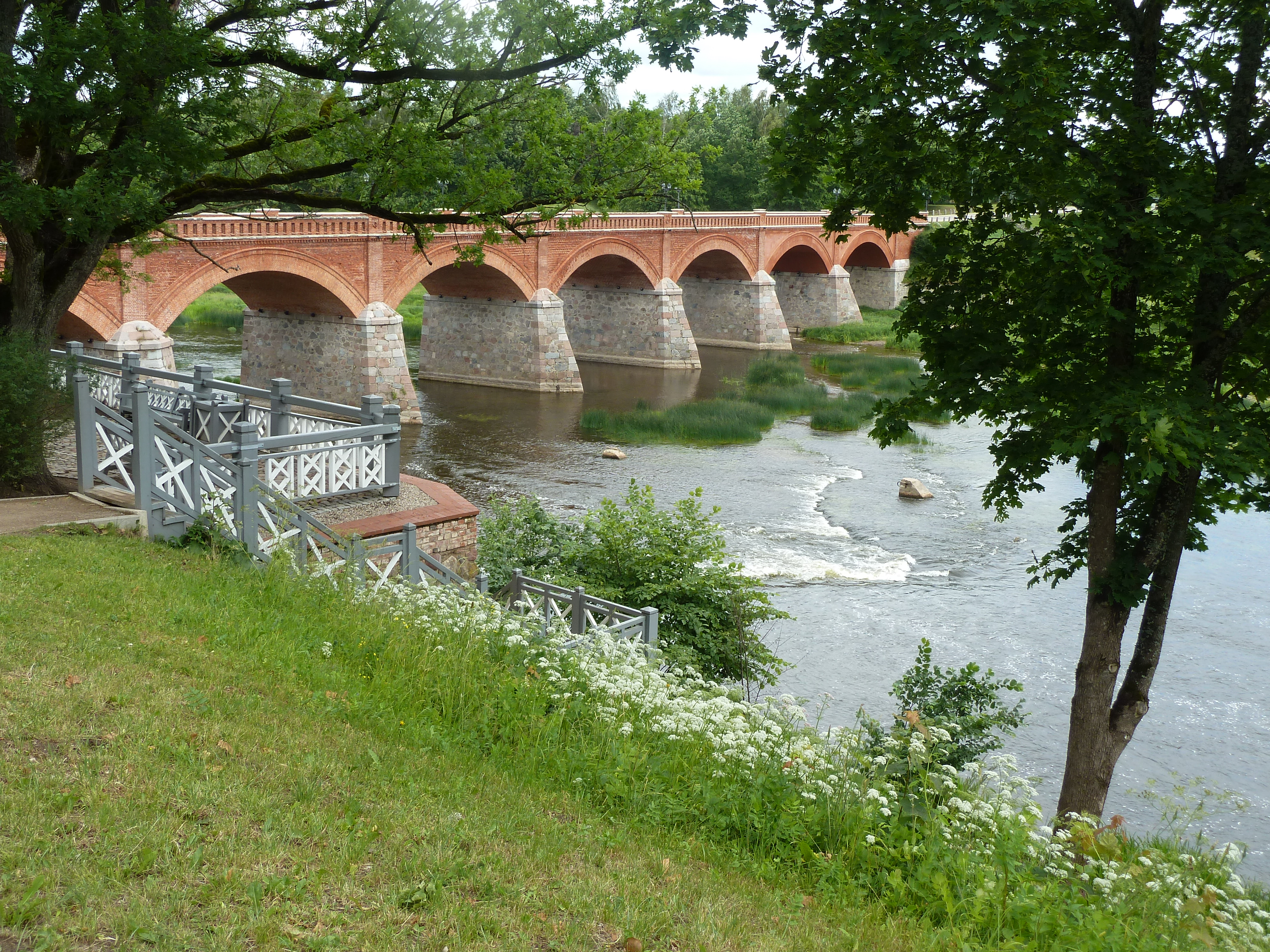
Kuldiga brick bridge.

240 m from the waterfall is located the famous Kuldiga brick bridge. It was built in 1874 and is the longest operating brick bridge in Europe. Built to the building standards of the time, it is wide enough for two carriages to pass. Its width is 8 m and its length is 164 m. It was modelled after the bridge on the Moselle river in Germany that was erected at the time of Roman Empire. The Kuldiga brick bridge was renovated in 2008 and is now in operation.

A wooden path for walking and observation was made along the river and the waterfall. It is visited by 130,000 tourists annually.

== Preservation ==
In 1977 the Venta Rapid was designated a natural monument of Latvia.

== See also ==
- List of waterfalls
