= Alsunga =

Village in Kuldīga Municipality, Latvia

Alsunga Alšvanga
- Village
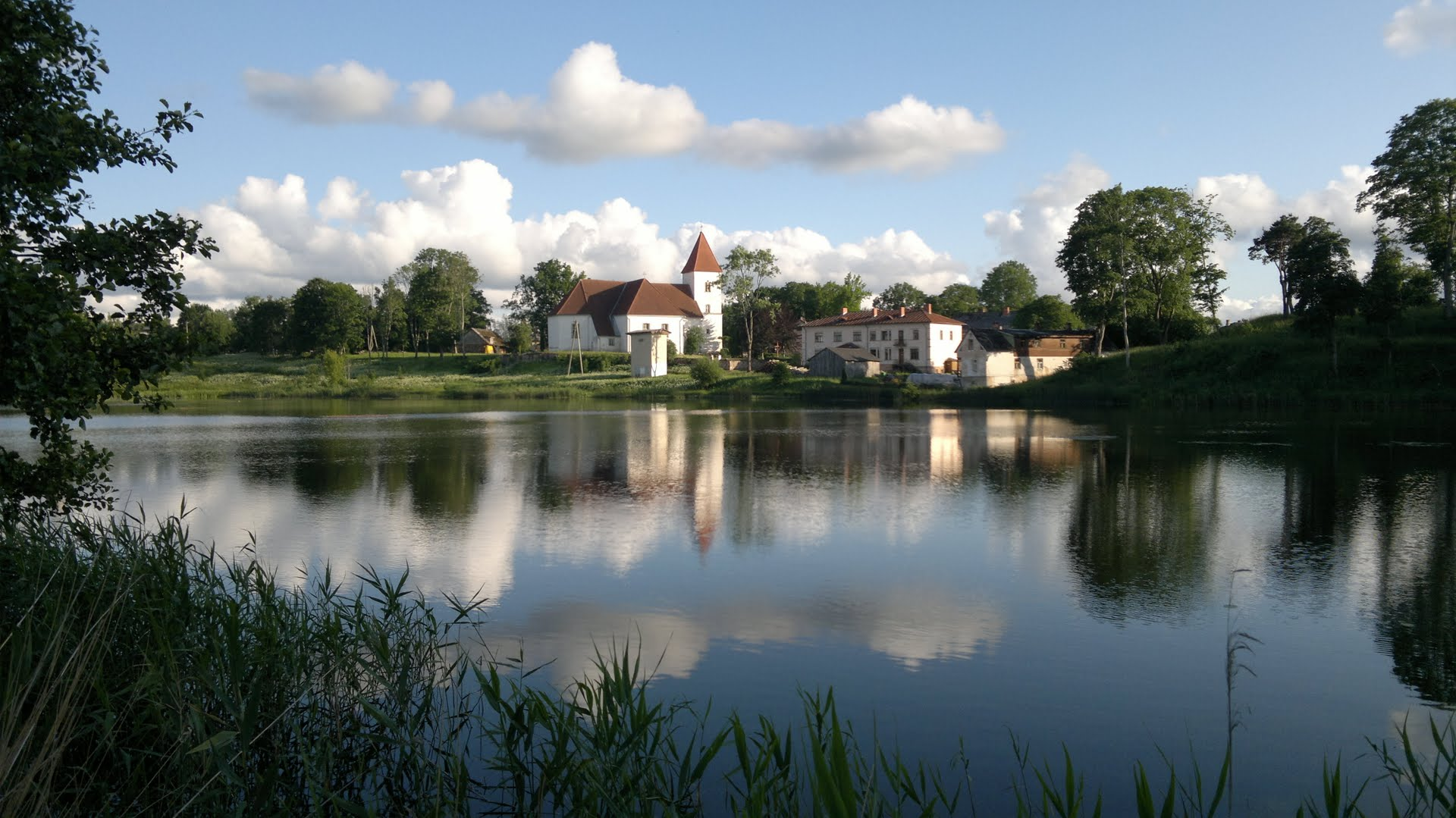
- Alsunga village

- Location in Latvia
- Coordinates: 56°59′N 21°34′E
- Country: Latvia
- Municipality: Kuldīga Municipality
- Parish: Alsunga Parish
- First mentioned in: 1230

Government
  - Alsunga Parish Administrator: Santa Kreičmane

Population
  - Total: 1,345
- Time zone: UTC+2 (EET)
  - Summer (DST): UTC+3 (EEST)
- Postal code: LV-3306
- Calling code: +371 6335
- Number of city council members: 13
- Website: www.alsunga.lv

Alsunga (also Alšvanga, German: Alschwangen) is a village and the center of Alsunga Parish, Kuldīga Municipality in the Courland region of Latvia. Alsunga is the center of the Suiti, a small Catholic community in the Lutheran western part of Latvia. There are approximately 1345 inhabitants in Alsunga.

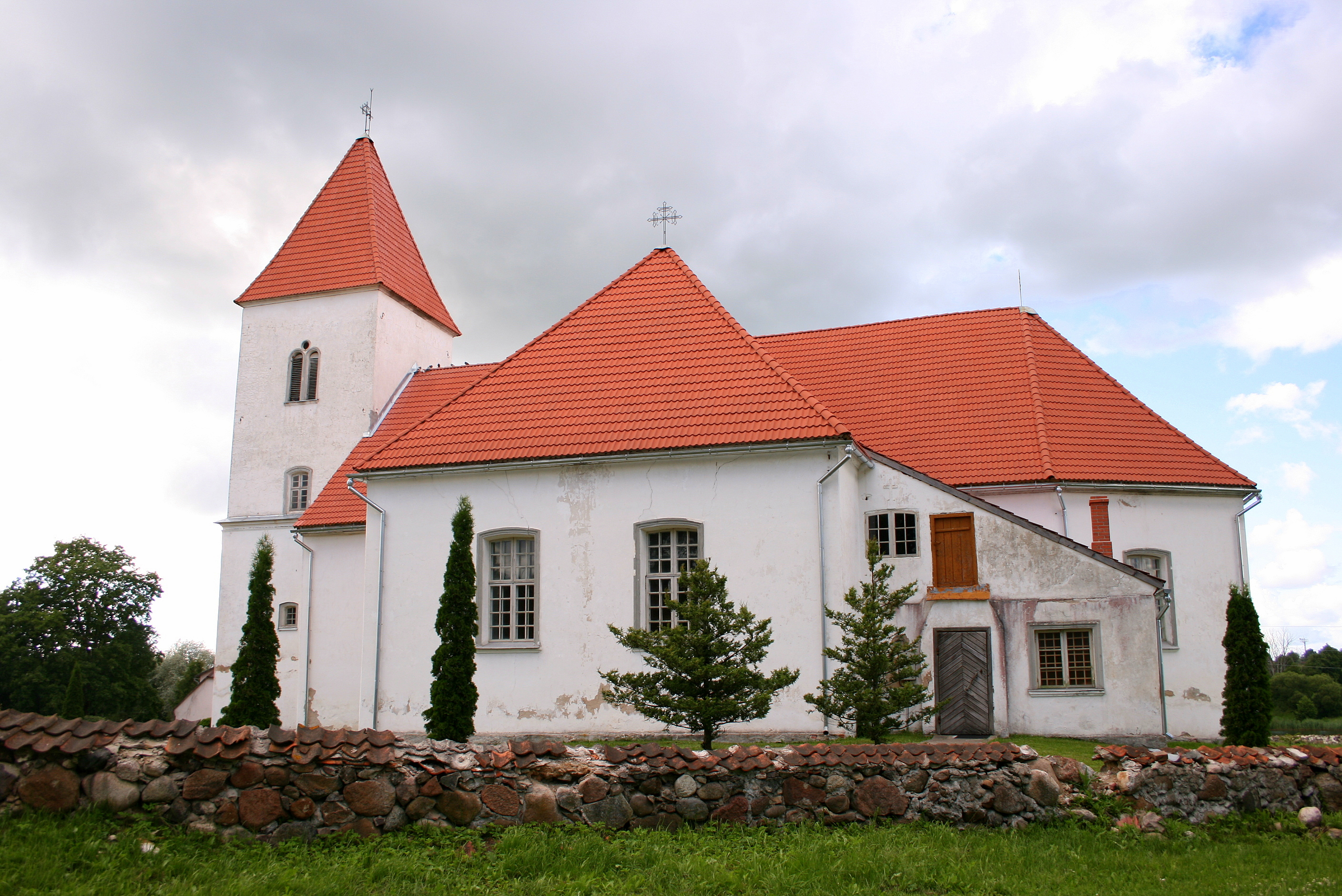
Alsunga Saint Michael Roman Catholic Church

Alsunga was first mentioned in 1230, as an old settlement of Curonians with Curonian name and typical suffix -anga- (comp. Alšvanga, Palanga). In 1372, a castle was built for the vogt of Kuldīga komtur. In 1561 Alsunga became the part of the predominantly Lutheran Duchy of Courland and Semigallia. In 1567, the Saint Michael church was built. In 1623, the local landowner, Johan Ulrich von Schwerin, in order to marry a Catholic court lady Barbara Konarska from Vilnius, agreed to himself become Catholic. After the marriage he lived in Lithuania and Poland until 1632, when he returned to Alsunga after his father's death. In 1634, Johan Ulrich invited Jesuits to establish a mission in Alsunga to help him transfer all his peasants to Catholic faith.

On October 1, 2009, the Suiti cultural space was included in the UNESCO List of Intangible Cultural Heritage in Need of Urgent Safeguarding.

== See also ==
- Alsunga Castle
