= Alsunga Parish =

Parish in Kuldīga Municipality, Latvia

Alsunga Parish (Latvian: Alsungas pagasts) is an administrative territorial entity of Kuldīga Municipality in the Courland region of Latvia. The administrative center is Alsunga.

Until 1949, the parish was a part of Aizpute county, from 1949 to 2009 - of the Kuldīga district and from 2009 to 2021 of the former Alsunga Municipality.
