= Snēpele Palace =

Palace in Latvia

Coordinates: 56°59′54″N 21°59′01″E

- Courland, Latvia
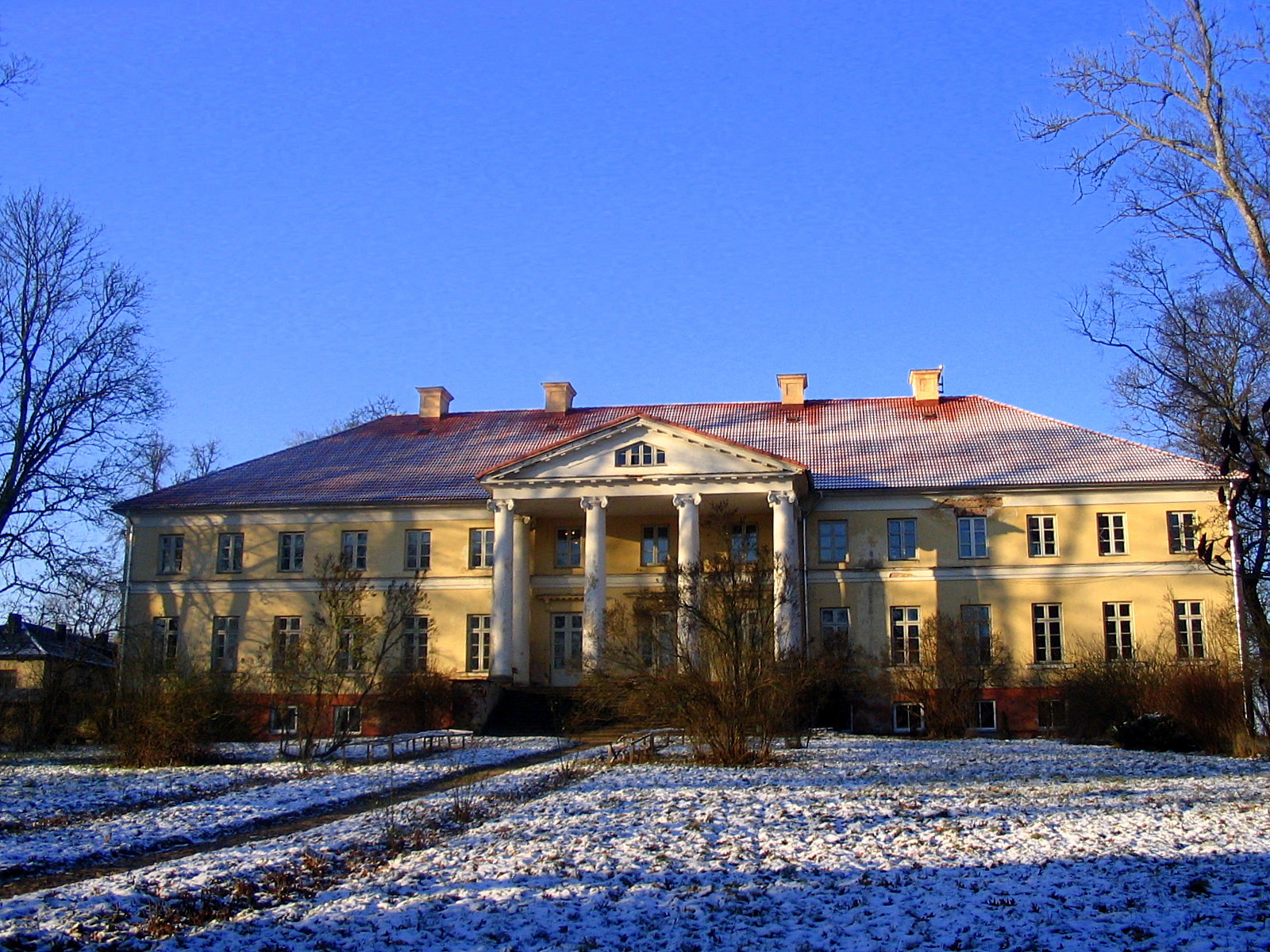

Site information
- Type: Palace

Snēpele Palace (Latvian: Snēpeles muižas pils) is a palace in Snēpele Parish, Kuldīga Municipality in the Courland region of Latvia. It was originally built at the beginning of the 19th century as a baronial hunting lodge with two room apartments for guests on the second floor. The building has housed the Snēpele primary school since 1924.

== Description ==
The building has decorated columns on both sides of the portico, and the wrought iron railing dates from the first half of the 19th century. The exterior doors are from the second half of the 19th century. The first floor has a hall with a beautiful painting on the ceiling. The second floor has a guest lounge with large rooms.

Preserved in the palace are three fireplaces, four columns and four furnaces. The corridors on both ends of the second floor remain with large semi-circular windows decorated with impressive ornaments. In the basement is the kitchen with auxiliary rooms where the school cafeteria is now located. Meals are taken to the dining room floor through an elevator.

== See also ==
- List of palaces and manor houses in Latvia
