= Bauska district =

District of Latvia

Coordinates: 56°24′N 24°11′E

Bauska
- District
- Coat of arms

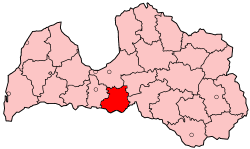
- Country: Latvia

Area
  - Total: 1,880 km^{2} (730 sq mi)

Population
  - Total: 50,811
  - Density: 27.0/km^{2} (70.0/sq mi)
- Website: bauskarp.lv/

Bauska district (Latvian: Bauskas rajons) was an administrative division of Latvia, located in Semigallia region, in the country's centre. It was organized into a city, a municipality and fifteen parishes, each with a local government authority. The principal city was Bauska.

== History ==
In the 15th century, Bauska Castle was built as a stronghold of the Livonian Order and a settlement developed around the fortification, called Vairogmiests. In 1584, Gotthard Kettler instituted a plan to remove the settlement and organize streets for a new town of Bauska, which received its town charter in 1609. The area was annexed by the Russian Empire in 1795, and an administrative unit was formed 1819 as Kreis Bauske (Russian: Бауский уезд). When Latvian independence was declared on 18 November 1918 the kreis was renamed, reorganized and included territory which is now part of Lithuania. By 1920, Bauska county (Latvian: Bauskas apriņķis) included: Bauska Town and 20 parishes: Bauska, Bārbele, Brukna, Ceraukste, Code, Iecava, Īslīce, Jaunsaule, Kurmene, Mežotne, Misa, Panemune, Rundāle, Skaistkalne, Stelpe, Svitene, Taurkalne, Vecsaule, Vecumnieki, and Zālīte.

During World War II Bauska was occupied by Soviet forces and heavy fighting destroyed many of the structures of the main town. The Jewish Latvian population of the area were largely exterminated by Nazi forces and several thousand residents of the district were deported in 1941 and 1949 during political unrest. Reoccupation of Latvia by the Soviet Union at the end of World War II resulted in creation of the Bauska district (Latvian: Bauskas rajons) in 1949. The Baldone parish took over administration of Iecava, Misa, Stelpe, Vecumnieki and Zālīte parishes. The Eleja parish absorbed Svitene Parish and Jaunjelgava parish added the territories of Kurmene and Taurkalne parishes.

Latvia regained its independence in 1991. The districts of Latvia were reformed in 2009 and Bauska district was rendered defunct. It was split between the Bauska, Iecava, Rundāle and Vecumnieki municipalities.

== Current cities, municipalities and parishes in the Bauska district ==
- Bauska city
- Brunava parish
- Ceraukste parish
- Code parish
- Dāviņi parish
- Gailīši parish
- Īslīce parish
- Mežotne parish
- Vecsaule parish
