= History of Bauska =

City in Latvia

The history of Bauska, a city in southern Latvia, dates back to the 13th century. Its early history was driven by its location on the trade road from Zemgale to Lithuania. Over the centuries, Bauska has experienced periods of prosperity, destruction and war, followed by growth.

== Prehistory ==
Archaeological excavations show that in the 1st century BC an ancient Semigallian settlement existed on the hill where Bauska Castle was later built.

== Emerging settlement ==
At the beginning of the 13th century, the Bauska mound was part of Upmale land, the center of which was on the nearby Mežotne mound. The Lielupe-Mūša trade route to the Samogitians and Aukštaitija lands passed through it. In 1219, Upmale voluntarily accepted the protection of the Bishop of Livonia and became part of the Selonia Diocese. In 1226, it became a part of the Zemgale Diocese. In 1254, the land of Upmale was divided between the Archbishopric of Riga and the Livonian Order on the left bank of the Lielupe river.

=== Castle ===
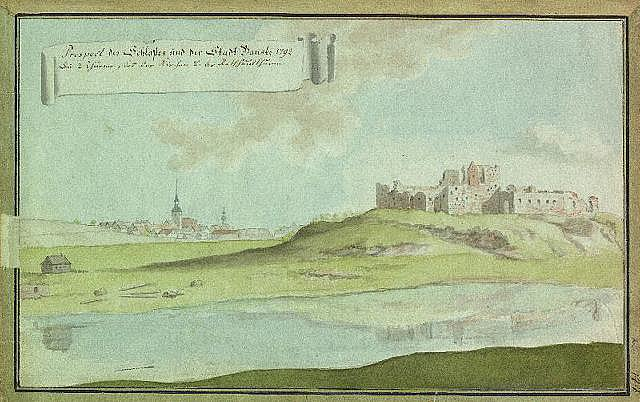
Painting of the Bauska Castle ruins with the Church of the Holy Spirit in the background, 1792.

The city of Bauska developed around Bauska Castle and the surrounding castle settlement. It is first mentioned in 1443 when Livonian Order Master Heinrich Vinke von Overberg ordered the erection of a fortress on the ancient mound, which was to defend the border with the rival Grand Duchy of Lithuania. As Bauska's region was sparsely populated at that time, the castle was built by ethnic Votes, who were prisoners of war from Novgorod. In 1495 the Bauska Fortress became the residence of the Livonian Order Bauska Fogta. In 1558, 1590 and 1601, the Kurzeme Landtag took place in Bauska Castle. The first mention of a craftsman settlement called "Schildburg" ("Vairogmiest"), where craftsmen, fishermen, merchants lived at the confluence of Mūsa and Mēmele, on the fortress of the Pumpkin Peninsula, was in 1518.

Narrow city rights were already granted to this settlement in 1511. There was a Church of St. Gertrude with a cemetery, a pastor's house, a pub, a school built in 1570, landlords' houses, and fishermen's cottages. The foundations of the church were still visible around 1870.

After the military setbacks to the Livonian Order during the Livonian War in 1559, Bauska Castle was forced to be mortgaged to the allied Lithuanians. When the Order ceased to exist after the conclusion of Treaty of Vilnius in 1561, Bauska Castle became part of the Duchy of Courland and Semigallia.

== Duchy of Courland and Semigallia ==
On May 11, 1575, a fire broke out in a Duke-owned pub that burned down the entire castle settlement except the church. The protection of the castle and the further growth of the town were limited by its location on a narrow peninsula. In 1584, following the order of the Duke of Courland Gotthard Kettler, the castle settlement was dismantled and residents began to build a new town on the left bank of the Nemunėlis river at the location of the modern Bauska Old Town.

=== Establishment of the city ===
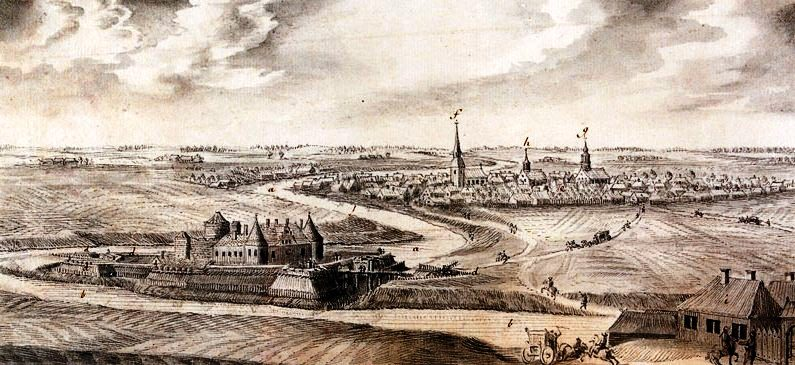
Bauska and its castle in 1706

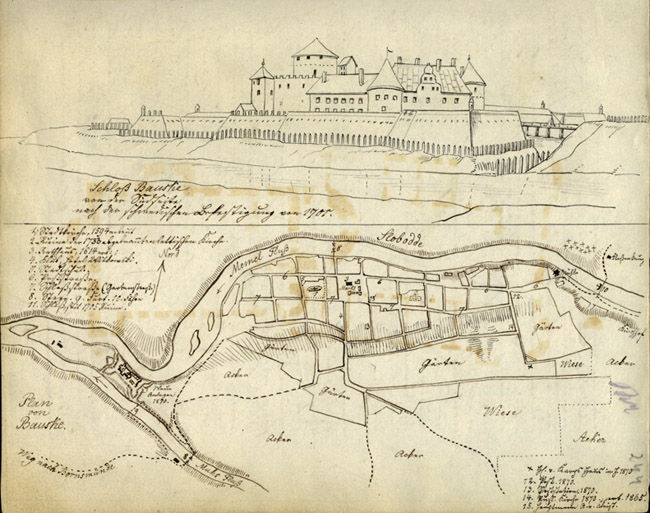
Bauska Castle and city's plan in 1701

Moving from the narrow castle settlement to the new city of Bauska took several years. By 1573, a wooden church was built for the Latvian congregation on the territory of the present-day garden at Trinity Lutheran Church. In 1688, the wooden church was renovated. In 1705, the church was in such a bad condition that the church services for the Latvian congregation were transferred to the German Church of the Holy Spirit. In 1726, funds were raised to repair the church. As repairs were nearing the end in 1733, a fire completely burned down the building.

Between 1591 and 1594, the city built the Church of the Holy Spirit, the first stone building in the city. From 1705 the church services were also held in Latvian.

The Duke of Bauska granted city rights in 1600. In 1609, Duke Friedrich Kettler gave Bauska a stamp with the image of a lion of Courland, now considered the year of the granting of city rights. On July 21, 1615, Bauska was also granted meadows and pastures and on December 18, 1615, the city received the right to build a town hall and shops. In 1635 the city received Procedural Rules.

According to the police regulations approved by Duke Friedrich, Bauska's town council consisted of eight people – a mayor, a captive (judge) and six city councilors. The city introduced taxes and regulated trade and pubs. Begging was permitted for registered beggars, who had to carry a certified tin plate. Lime and brick kilns were built in 1632.

In the 17th century Bauska was the third-largest city of the Duchy of Courland. It had a regular block layout consisting of two main streets parallel to Mēmele, a market square with a town hall, two Lutheran churches and one-story wooden buildings. It had city-made sidewalks and a night watch.

=== Goldsmiths' cunfte ===
There was no shortage of wealthy people in Bauska, as evidenced by the remains of the magnificent pottery found, as well as the establishment of a goldsmiths' cunfte office in 1638. At the request of Bauska goldsmiths Heinrich Tinnes, Bertram Hilbrant, Hans Garding and Berent Boanne, the Duke of Courland issued the Bauska Goldsmiths' Statute in 1638. Four masters had to be in the Bauska goldsmiths' cunfte. The Duke had the right to include another goldsmith at his own discretion in the cunfte. It took three years for a goldsmith apprentice to acquire the position of goldsmith. Bauska goldsmiths made a variety of gold and silver items for the needs of local landlords, churches, merchants and rich farmers. Between 1686 and 1697, goldsmith Tobias Müller worked in Bauska. In 1712, Bauska goldsmith Christoffer Kölsing asked to be admitted to the Jelgava Goldsmith's Cunfte, as all Bauska goldsmiths had died in the Great Northern War plague outbreak. Christoffer Kölsing died in 1732 and was buried in Bauska. Goldsmith Friedrich Hermann Jacobi worked in Bauska from 1749 to 1796.

=== Wars and plague ===
During the Polish-Swedish War, the Duchy of Courland had been out of production for several years in the early 1620s. Famine broke out and was followed by a plague epidemic of 1623–1625. In September 1625, the troops of Gustavus Adolphus of Sweden occupied and plundered Bauska Castle and the city. By 1629, the city was under Swedish control.

During the Second Northern War, Bauska was occupied by Swedish troops, and then Polish-Lithuanian troops. Duke Jacob Kettler recovered it only in 1660 after paying the Polish-Lithuanian king 10,000 guilders. A plague epidemic broke out again in the city, killing 227 plague victims in just one month. On February 14, 1660, the Bauska City Magistrate ordered the collection of dead bodies on the streets and burial. After the war and the end of the plague, the pre-war activity of Bauska Castle and the city returned as it had survived mostly unharmed.

Shortly after the Great Northern War began in 1700, Bauska was occupied by Saxon troops. It is possible that Bauska Castle was visited by the King of Poland Augustus II the Strong and the Russian Tsar Peter I, who in the winter of 1701 held talks on further war tactics in Biržai Castle. After the victory over the Saxons at the Crossing of the Düna battle in 1701, Bauska was captured by the army of King Charles XII of Sweden and was temporarily taken away by Russian troops in 1705. In 1706, both Bauska Castle and palace were partially blown up by the retreating Russian troops. It was no longer restored and eventually fell into ruins. During the war, two-thirds of the city buildings were also destroyed. The early winter of 1708 cut short the harvest and led to a famine. At the same time, the Great Northern War plague outbreak began. On July 3, 1709, church services were banned in Bauska to prevent the plague from spreading, and the dead were buried outside the burial grounds of churches. After the winter of 1708/1709, only one-third of the pre-war population of Bauska had survived the plague epidemic and famine.

Bauska was ravaged by war and plague until the mid-18th century. In 1762, members of the Magistrate were appointed noblemen and were allowed to carry a sword during their duties.

== Kurzeme Province of Russian Empire ==
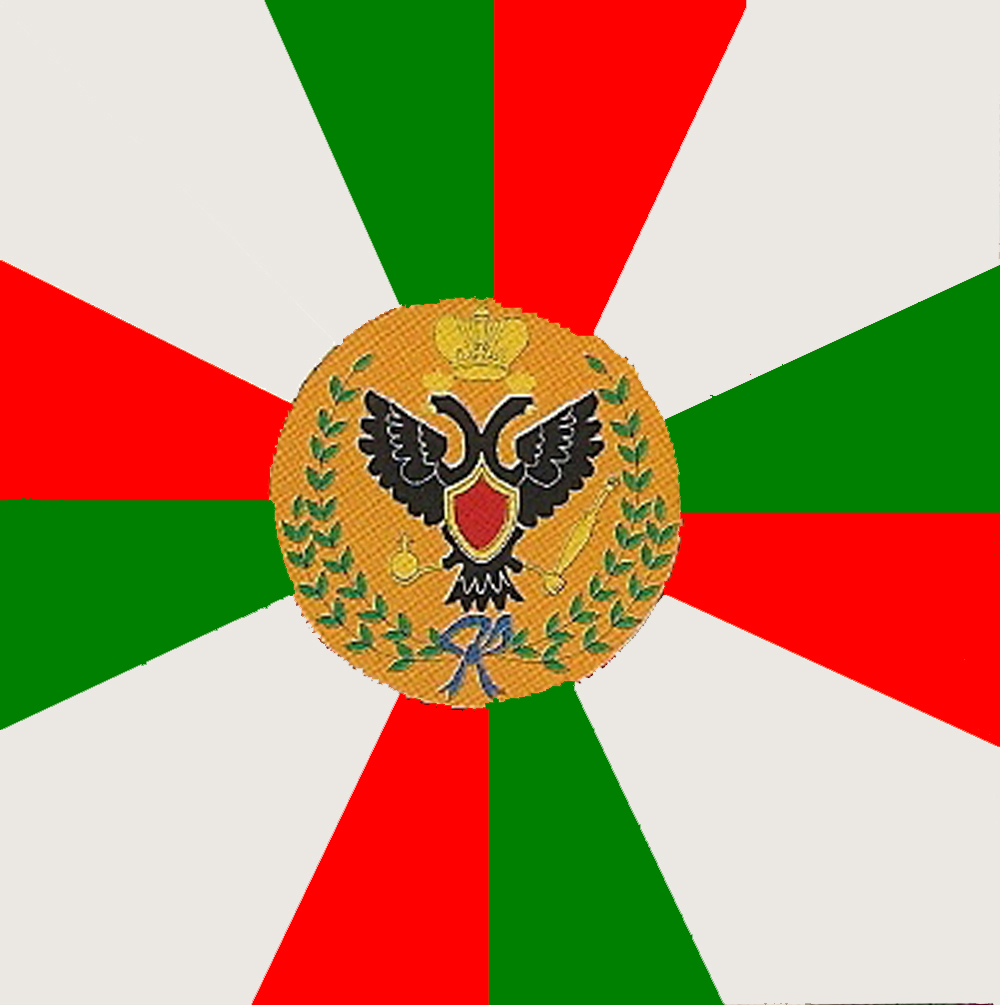
Sofia Musketeer Regiment banner, 1797.

After the third partition of Poland in 1795, the Duchy of Courland and Semigallia was acquired by the Russian Empire. Bauska retained its status as the administrative center. In July 1797 the Sofia Musketeer Regiment of the Russian Empire was stationed in the city. In 1806 the first school was opened. In 1799 lightning struck the tall Bauska Church of the Holy Spirit and as a "temporary" replacement, a flat roof was constructed, which has survived to this day.

=== French invasion ===
During the War of 1812, several battles took place near Bauska, the largest of which was the Battle of Ekau. On July 17, the Commander of the Russian Empire's troops in Bauska, Lieutenant Colonel Kunicki of the Polish Uhlans Regiment, learned of an approaching Prussian intelligence unit, confronted it and launched a battle four versts, or about 2.6 miles (4.2 km), from Bauska, but was defeated and forced to retreat in the direction of Iecava (German: Eckau). On July 18, Bauska was captured by the 27th Prussian Division of General Julius von Grawert of the Napoleonic Army Marshal Jacques MacDonald's Prussian Corps on their way toward Riga.

On August 1, Napoleon ordered the establishment of the Duchy of Kurzeme, Zemgale, and Piltene, a council of eight people led by Count Karl Johann Friedrich von Medem. The townspeople had to pay contributions and were obliged to feed the soldiers, who remained in Bauska until early December. The 7th French Division left the city on December 7.

=== Post-war development ===
In 1814, when the city plan was created, the city had 108 buildings and 28 building plots. On May 1, 1815, the peak of the tall Lutheran church tower was struck by lightning repeatedly, also destroying the masonry. After the abolition of serfdom in Kurzeme in 1817, the population of the city started to increase.

Following the administrative reform of Courland Province in 1819, Bauska became the center of Bauska County. Beginning in 1820, Jews who had previously lived in a separate settlement behind the river were allowed to settle in Bauska.

In 1823, there were 120 dwellings in Bauska, of which only six were brick, so the city was often devastated by fires. The city had one Lutheran church and two synagogues.

On June 6, 1825, Russian Emperor Alexander I stayed overnight in Bauska.

From November 17, 1831, to January 24, 1832, the Sapper Leib-garde Battalion, which participated in the repression of the November uprising Congress Poland, arrived for winter recreation.

By 1835 the city had a population of 2142. There were two crown schools in Bauska with 61 pupils and two private girls' schools with 18 pupils. There were 17 prisoners in the City Prison.

In 1848, farmers were allowed to settle freely throughout the territory of the Courland Governorate (including towns). Many rural craftsmen came to Bauska and it became one of the Zemgale grain, flax, linseed, and livestock trade centers. The city has traditionally hosted three major fairs: Methane, Mary and St. Franciscan days (French Market). The largest of these was the French Market, which usually took place in early October and lasted a week.

The many visitors to the market led to a large number of inns and pubs in Bauska. By order of the Governor of Kurzeme in 1858, there were 25 pubs and inns in Bauska where beverages could be sold to farmers who came to the market.

From September 17, 1855, to June 26, 1856, the 1st Sumy Hussar Regiment was stationed in the town. The city was not only a center for agricultural commodities, but it was also where the production of goods for farmers begins to develop. Hansberg Plow Works began in 1862.

In the mid-19th century, there were 126 craftsmen in the city, including 23 shoemakers, 35 shops, 37 pubs, a wool mill, watermills, a sawmill, an agricultural tool factory, and a brick kiln. There were many orchards around the city. In 1873, Theodore Loding Brewery was founded. In 1869, the Bauska Voluntary Firefighters Association was founded. In 1876, the city's savings bank was founded.

City life was greatly hampered by the lack of bridges over the Mūsa and Mēmele. In 1874, a raft bridge was built across the Mēmele. On July 10, 1888, The newly built Mūsa Bridge was officially opened. The construction of the stone-built bridge began on June 1, 1886, and cost 89,000 rubles. The opening was attended by the Governor of Courland, the elder of the local landlords, other noblemen and officials. The governor was welcomed at the bridge by the city board and the fire brigade.

On November 11, 1893, the first city newspaper Bauskas Sludinājumi (Bauskas Announcements), founded by Nahman (Nikolaj) Yankelovich, began to be published in the Latvian, Russian and German languages. It remained in a circulation of 1000–1500 copies until 1915.

In the middle of the 19th century Bauska was a multinational city, but many of the privileges inherited from earlier times have been maintained by the Baltic Germans, who controlled the entire city administration. In 1889, Bauska, along with other Latvian cities, dismantled the German magistrate that had been governing the city since 1511 and introduced a city-wide administration. The most active in trade were the Jews, who at that time accounted for more than half of the city's population, and in 1863 owned 70 of the city's 75 shops. Since the end of the 19th century Latvians had also been mentioned among the wealthiest households, craftsmen and entrepreneurs of the city.

In 1882, the area of the city of Bauska was 72 desyatina. In addition, the city still owned 269 desyatina and 406 km^{2} of land. Many houses had extensive orchards.

In the late 19th and early 20th century, the construction of brick buildings expanded in the city. The central part of the city was still on the left bank of Mēmele, with only the Big Street (now Riga Street) and the Market Square (now Town Hall Square), where the market was held twice a week (Tuesdays and Fridays). Along Cūku Street (now Plūdoņa Street), farmers drove livestock to the market.

Lutheran residents of the city were in German and Latvian congregations, both of which used the Bauska Church of the Holy Spirit. The Jews had the Great and the Little synagogues. In 1864, a Catholic church was built. In 1881, St. George's Church was built. At the turn of the 20th century, the townhouses the Bauska County School, the Julian Beeke private girls' gymnasium, the Žibeika Commercial School, and the Jewish yeshiva were built. From April 24, 1902, until his death in 1918, Oskar von Brandenburg ruled the city. During these years the hospital was modernized, a cattle slaughterhouse was built, a sewage system was partially built, and a city telephone exchange was opened, connecting Bauska with Jelgava and Riga.

During the revolution of 1905, a strike took place in Bauska in early 1905. On October 23, a rally took place under the red flag in the castle ruins, attended by a few thousand people. At the end of the year, a revolutionary steering committee was established to control power until the beginning of January 1906, when it was repressed in a punitive expedition. Several revolutionary activists were shot dead.

On March 17–18, 1906, there were City Council elections. Before them, a fierce struggle broke out between the German (10 seats) and the Jewish (2 seats) coalition that won the 1902 elections and the Latvian MPs (8 seats). As only those earning a certain level of income could vote, to reduce the number of Latvian voters, a number of Latvian homebuyers were lowered to the value of 300 rubles.

In 1909 the city had about 7,000 inhabitants. As a large shopping center, the city had 15 beer bars, 6 taverns, 4 hotel-pubs, 4 beer stores, 4 wine cellars, 2 vodka stores, a garden restaurant, and the Loding Brewery, which produces about 100,000 buckets of beer per year. There were 14 different societies and 3 credit unions operating in the city. In 1908 there were 14 theater performances in Latvian. Around 900 children were taught by eight schools, of which four were secondary and four were elementary.

== World War I and Latvian War of Independence ==
Before World War I 8300 people lived in Bauska. Almost half of the city's population (mostly Jews) were forced to flee by the Russian authorities before the Germans arrived in 1915.

=== German occupation ===
During the Kurzeme offensive on July 28, 1915, German Empire troops pushed the Russian Empire army up to the Lielupe. On July 31, the Germans forced the Lielupe near Bauska and around 8 pm Bauska was captured by the German Empire, receiving 1450 soldiers and war trophies. During the German occupation in 1916, a power station was built in Bauska by the Meitene-Bauska narrow-gauge railway line.

From March to November 1918, Bauska was part of the Duchy of Courland restored by the Baltic Germans and later the United Baltic Duchy, which, on November 18, lost power to the Latvian Provisional Government led by Kārlis Ulmanis.

In November 1918, about 300 German army soldiers under the command of von Firksa were in town. On November 30, the city council was formed of five people, and the first head of Bauska was lawyer Janis Klavins, and his deputies were R. Gutman, J. Viumsons, J. Israelelsons, and E. Rijkur. At the first meeting, it was decided that the meetings would be held in Latvian instead of German or Russian. On December 1, the new board decided that seven militia guards would keep order in the city.

=== Bolsheviks in power ===
As Soviet Russia's troops approached, the last 30–40 German Iron Division troops left Bauska on January 4, 1919. The Latvian Provisional Government remained in the hands of the loyal city head attorney Klavins. As he stated that the Red Riflemen were not to be feared, because they were not Bolsheviks, but good Latvians, German townspeople sought to dismiss Klavins.

On January 5, 12 Iron Division soldiers returned to Bauska to continue collecting items not collected the previous day. The militia commanded by Klavins arrested them, and at the same time arrested several German businessmen in the city. The city was in a great mood. On January 6, when a white-collar unit in Russian uniforms passed through the city, retreating from the Bolsheviks, the townspeople regarded them as Red Army men and they were invited to a ball at the Kurzeme Hotel. On January 7, a unit defeated by the Bolsheviks reached Bauska. The Landesvere send a delegation for negotiation under the command of an officer, whom Klavins ordered arrested. The Landesvere forces responded with a battle that ended with a Landesvere victory and the release of prisoners. Klavins and six other militia members were shot dead. The same day the Landeswreck left the city.

On January 9, the Soviet Latvian Army cavalry entered Bauska, followed by infantry and artillery on January 10. Regular units of the Red Army went further, but a number of Bolshevik activists remained in the city, who introduced Soviet power. The Revolutionary Tribunal and the Battle Group were led by Sparrow. The political department was headed by Namnieks. The Executive Committee was chaired by Silis. About 100 volunteers applied to join the Red Army.

House searches and seizures of property took place, and nearly all German families were stripped of their clothes, silverware, and food. On January 13, there were the first executions of the Revolutionary Tribunal. Edgar von Ulot and the pastor Hans Bielenstein were shot in the mound park. Von Ulot was shot for directing the police during the oppression of the 1905 revolution, while Beelenstein was a member of the German occupation regime. During the months of Bolshevik rule, several merchants were shot, as well as Latvians and Germans accused of unauthorized speculation or cooperation with the German army.

On March 12 there was a meeting in the Church of the Holy Spirit, which was to be attended by all the inhabitants of the city. The head of the political department Namnieks strongly criticized the pastor Kristaps Strautmanis. After the Landesvere units liberated Jelgava from the Bolsheviks, on March 19, panic broke out among the Bolsheviks and they left a number of prisoners, including Pastor Strautman, but returned on March 20. Pastor Strautmanis and other prisoners were shot in the Vecsaule Forest. On March 21, German pastor Fricis Stafenhagen hid in a neighbor's garden house to avoid becoming a victim of the Bolshevik terror. Wealthy business brothers Lodiņi spent a couple of days in their beer brewery hiding in an empty beer barrel.

=== Baltische Landeswehr and Bermondt-Avalov ===
On March 23, at around 7:00 am, from the north and east of the city, came the military of Count York, backed by the Brandis branch. Bauska was defended by the Soviet Latvian Army 99th Regiment, supported by units of the 3rd and 8th Latvian Red Rifle Regiments. The battle resulted in 400 prisoners of war and 4 machine guns.

Distressed Bruno Lodin was appointed head of Bauska City on March 30. The front line stabilized on the cavalry from Bauska, and there were regular battles in the next few months. During April 22–24, 1919, the Baltische Landeswehr Bauska Battalion with 300 volunteer soldiers was formed under the leadership of local Latvian officers. Bauska Commander fon Betiher was appointed Battalion Commander, and Latvian officers Berzins, Krasts and Ermanis were appointed Commanders of the Battalion.

On April 26, the Bolsheviks began firing on the city's artillery. When the Bolsheviks attacked Bauska on April 28 and approached Mēmele Bridge, 50 armed Bauska battalion soldiers under the leadership of Vilis Olavs (1902–1944) broke into Derpele manor and attacked the bomber. On May 1, the Bauska Battalion together with the Germans went on a counterattack against the attacking Lithuanian Bolshevik forces, capturing 35 soldiers and 2 machine guns. In the following week the battalion fought in Lithuania. On May 18, the last battalion attack on Ceraukste Parish was unleashed.

On May 22, 1919, the city was taken over by the government of Andrievs Niedra and commanded by Pavel Bermondt-Avalov in September 1919. During the battles of the West Russian Volunteer Army and Bermontia against the Latvian Armies, Bauska was released by Valmiera and Jelgava regiments on the morning of November 17, 1919, obtaining hundreds of rifles, dozens of machine guns and two artillery-loaded wagons.

== Republic of Latvia, 1920–1940 ==
Of the pre-war 8300 citizens, only 2900 remained in the city. During this time, there were Loding Brewery, United Mill, sawmills, 363 merchants, several credit unions and interest organizations in Bauska.

=== Council elections ===
On January 18, 1920, the first free city council elections were held, and on January 30, Juri Vareno was elected head of the city.

The February 1928 City Council elections by the Senate of Latvia were declared unlawful by a decision of October 15, 1928, and were canceled because they involved 43 city-dependent disabled people who lived not in Bauska, but in Durban Manor of Bauska Parish.

The re-election of the City Council took place on December 15 and 16, 1928, with 2534 voters. There were 295 votes cast for the "List of Joint Housewives, Public and Liberal Workers and Officials," with Augusts Ilziņš, Fricis Grīslis and Janis Priede elected to the Council. There were 189 votes cast for List 2 of the German Group, with Bruno Lodins and Arved Steben elected to the Duma. There were 530 votes cast for List 3 of the Latvian Social Democratic Workers' Party and Bauska Organization, with Eduards Rijkuris, Kārlis Pumpurs, Jēkabs Lūde and Jānis Piļevskis elected to the Council. There were 273 votes cast for the "List of Bauska Industrialists and Craftsmen, Old Riflemen-Liberators, Tenants and Landlords of the City Land," with Paulis Krauze and Rudolfs Silinieks elected to the Council. There were 411 votes cast for the "Bauska City Left Workers" List No.5, with Jāzeps Leitāns, Juris Šņore and Kārlis Jānuška elected. The list of "Bauska United Jewish Bloc" list No. 6 was transferred to 287, with David Hofchowitz and Benjamin-Vole Hercenberg elected. There were 71 votes cast for List 7 of the "United Christian Workers Group", with Arvēds Karklins elected to the council. There were 172 votes cast for the "Jewish Progressive Workers, Small Producers and Tenant Candidates" list # 8, which elected councilor Aix Levenstein. There were 297 votes cast for "United Bauska Homeowners, Traders and Officials" list # 9, with Juris Varenais and Janis Viesjānis elected to the council. Nine votes were invalid. The ruling coalition council was traditionally led by Augusts Ilziņš.

=== New Bauska ===
Former Lutheran Rectory lands (Garden, Acacia, Birch, Pilgrim, Meadow, Birzu Streets) and Orthodox Rectory lands (Uzvaras and Pilskalna Streets) were given to the city of Bauska during the Latvian Agrarian Reform in the 1920s. In 1926, construction of buildings began in the New Bauska area around Brivibas, Uzvaras, Skolas, Pilskalna, and Krasta streets. In 1926, the construction of the new Bauska Elementary School (now Bauska State Gymnasium) on Uzvaras Street, which cost 863 983 Ls, was commenced and completed.

On October 20, 1929, in the presence of the President Gustavs Zemgals, the Bauska Freedom Monument was unveiled. A new reinforced concrete bridge was erected over the Memel 1928 Bauska flood bridge.

From 1923, a weekly newspaper, Bauskas Vestnesis, was published, the circulation of which increased from 400 in the late 1920s to 3,000 in the mid-1930s. From May 28, 1930, to May 4, 1934, the weekly newspaper Bauskas Avize was published, which was printed in Jelgava.

On January 18, 1931, the Latvian Red Cross Outpatient Clinic was opened at Pils (Plūdoņa) Street 24, which was free of charge for the poor.

There were 664 books in the city library in 1926, and 3,500 in 1938. The Song Festival was held in Bauska on July 7, 1937. The city maintained Latvian and Jewish elementary schools. The Latvian elementary school had 445 children and 16 teachers, while there were 100 children and 5 teachers at the Jewish school.

=== Latvian coup d'état of May 15, 1934 ===
On May 16, in Bauska, church bells were heard, state flags were being flown, and in the evening a solemn service was held at the Church of the Holy Spirit.

During the 1934 Latvian coup d'état on the morning of May 16, a Bauska Guards Regiment was heading toward Riga. After the success of the coup, the guards expand their active ideological work by organizing courses, theater performances, and concerts. The guards created nine choirs, eight orchestras, and an extensive library, and organized and participated in public holidays.

The operation of the Bauska elected officials was suspended immediately after the coup. On May 31, the Adjutant of the Guard Regiment, Eduards Kasparsons, who had no previous work experience in the municipality, was appointed head of the city. The former city leaders Augusts Ilziņš and Juris Varenais continued to be active in the new city board; only the Social Democrats and minorities were excluded from power. On June 1–4, the Bauska Guards Regiment was on duty again in Riga, ensuring order after the coup.

On June 1, it was announced that the newspaper Zaļā Zemgale, which was wholly loyal to the official line of Ulmanis since autumn 1933, was merging with Bauskas Vestnesis. As of June 8, only the Bauska Journal was being published in Bauska, which declared that it will "express the common sense of the leadership of the state." Publications on donations of money to the guards and on the activities of the guards' regiment began to appear regularly. The first news of the $50 and $20 administrative fines for "spreading unfounded rumors," that is, critical statements against the Ulman regime, also appeared.

The first board meeting of the new city took place on June 11, 1934. An audit commission was set up to investigate the work of the former City Council, which was more formal as the deputy mayor Ilzins had been appointed as a member of the city board and the audit commission was headed by the former city mayor and councilor Juris Varenais.

=== Ulmanis authoritarian regime ===
On June 17, 1935, at the suggestion of Mayor Casparsons, 29 locals established the Bauska Branch of the Latvian Aeroclub. In 1935 it leased 12.2 ha of city meadows for 500 lats a year for 10 years for the construction of an airfield, which costs 2270 lats. In the spring of 1937, they built two sailplanes and later a third. There was also a hangar for aircraft storage.

In the mid-1930s, the city purchased a building on Pils Street 26, a health care center on Vienibas Street 17 and a shop building on the Market Square. As a gift, the city received the children's summer cottage "Marija" in Asari, Melitas Street 8, and a building on Uzvaras Street 4 for library and museum use.

A sewer network was constructed in Skolas, Industry, Guard and Big Baznicas streets. New Bauska was building a street cover at Skolas, Dārza, Pilskalna and Lielais Baznicas streets. In October 1938, the three-year blasting of the Mēmele dolomite from the castle mound to the mill was completed. This include a 12-meter wide and half-meter deep canal to facilitate the flow of timber rafts in a very shallow river. In 1938 construction began on the Bauska hospital; it was completed in November 1942.

On the peninsula between Bauska Castle and Ķirbaksala, the planting and establishment of a park began on May 15, 1937. In Bauska Castle, the ruins were strengthened and a viewing area was built in the tower, which was visited by Ulmanis in June 1938.

In the late 1930s, when traditional markets became less popular, the town's income was supplemented by slaughterhouse work, which was rented for $6,000 a year. In 2005, the slaughterhouse was expanded, including a cold store.

Following the coup, the Bauska Farmers' Credit Union, Bauska Latvian Credit Union and Bauska Homeowner Credit Unions were merged into the Bauska Credit Union. At the end of 1938, it had 1,200 members. In total, loans in the amount of LVL 1.69 million were issued to enterprises and residents of Bauska city and district.

The Bauska-Meitene train ran several times a day and connected the city with Jelgava and Riga. Bus service with Riga was provided by the Raimunds Liepkalns company.

=== Electrification ===
On November 1, 1932, the city owned the Bauska power grid, but electricity production was still provided by the private company Savienotās dzirnavas. The upgrading of power cables by 1934 cost 20,000 LVL. Switching from DC to AC costs another 12,000 LVL.

Electricity consumption in 1933 was 137,800 kWh, but in 1937 it was 180,000 kWh. The city's profit from electricity sales increased from 16,700 to 26,900 lats. Electricity was sold for 0.40 LVL per kilowatt-hour to households, 0.25 LVL to industrial companies, and 0.19 LVL per kilowatt-hour to local government. Until December 1939, electricity was sold to the city by Savienotās dzirnavas, whose generator was powered by river water. On December 5, 1939, Bauska began receiving electricity from the newly built Ķegums Hydroelectric Power Station.

=== City leaders ===
- 1918–1919, Janis Klavins
- From March 31, 1919, Bruno Lodiņš
- From November 25, 1919, Juris Varenais
- From February 18, 1925, Augusts Ilziņš
- From May 31, 1934, Eduards Kasparsons
- From July 10, 1940, Jāzeps Leitāns

== World War II ==
After Nazi Germany and Soviet Union entered into the Molotov–Ribbentrop Pact in 1939, Latvia fell into the USSR sphere of influence in accordance with the Pact's secret protocols, and was annexed by the USSR in 1940.

=== The departure of the Baltic Germans ===
After the end of the Polish Campaign in late 1939, almost all Germans left Bauska and relocated to the newly annexed territories in Western Poland. On October 15, 1939, the last church service was held by the German congregation. About 170 people left the city on November 12, closing three stores, some workshops, and a pharmacy. One of the traditional urban populations, the Baltic Germans, disappeared. There remained some, mostly mixed, families who did not want to leave their homes. Among those who left were pastor Eckert of the Bauska German congregation, doctors Trey and Kolbe, owner of the brewery Lodin with his family, and shopkeeper Miller. German flats and shops could only be rented with the permission of the Bauska district governor.

=== Soviet Occupation, 1940–1941 ===
On June 17, 1940, the city was occupied by the Red Army. On July 10, 1940, the decision to release all former heads of Latvian municipalities was published. By order of the Minister of the Interior Vilis Lācis, Jāzeps Leitāns was appointed the elder of Bauska City.

Privately owned businesses and buildings were nationalized. The largest nationalized company was the United Mill, which employed 148 people. Apartments for ten families were furnished in four nationalized new buildings. A children's playground was planned between Sun, Kaleja and Plūdoņa Street.

On July 21, 1940, a rally was held to celebrate the "People's Saeima," and on August 6, a rally was held in honor of Latvia's "welcome" to the USSR, with approximately 5,000 people participating. On January 11, 1941, several thousand city dwellers attended a rally on the market square for the election of the USSR Supreme Council. The rally concluded with the decision to send a congratulatory telegram to Stalin.

During this Soviet occupation, about one hundred Bauska residents suffered from repression and deportation.

=== Nazi Occupation, 1941–1944 ===
On June 28, the city was occupied by the Wehrmacht, after launching an attack from the Lithuanian city Žeimelis. The Red Army did not defend the city particularly well, and retreated to Riga. The subsequent German attack on Riga was launched from Bauska.

Bauska became part of the newly formed Reichskommissariat Ostland Latvian General Area, and the Nazi Occupation years began. By the beginning of July 1941 the Bauska Synagogue was burnt down, on July 9, a Jewish ghetto was created behind Salātu Street, and on July 15, 56 Jews were publicly castrated in Bauska Marketplace. By the end of August, some 2,000 Latvian Jews living in Bauska and the surrounding area had been killed in the city and the Vecsaule Concentration Camp. The Bauska Jewish community ceases to exist.

=== 500th Anniversary of Bauska ===
On June 20, 1943, the city celebrated its 500th anniversary, based on Bauska being founded in 1443, when the construction of the Livonian Order's new castle began. A number of German occupation authorities attended the anniversary event, including Latvian General Area Commissioner-General Drehsler, Jelgava County Commissioner von Medem, and Director-General for Home Affairs Oscar Danker. The speeches emphasized the positive role of German Militarism, as well as the unity of Germans and Latvians during the war.

The celebration on June 20 began at 8 a.m. with church services in the city, and at 9 a.m. the ceremonial act of reprivatization in the castle ruins began, during which 1000 land and house owners received property documents on the properties nationalized in 1940 by the Captain Commissioner. At 11 am, a solemn act began in the town hall, spoken by the town's elder J. Skalder, Otto Drehsler and Oscar Danker. A memorial plaque was unveiled on the Bauska Castle mound with the inscription: "The Germans and Latvians united under the rule of Adolf Adolf Hitler in the fight against Bolshevism celebrated the 500th anniversary of Bauska Castle. 20.6.1943." An art exhibition was opened in the city. At 5:00 p.m., the outdoor play "Wedding at John's Father's Court" began between the hospital and Corfu Garden, and was attended by about 10,000 people.

=== Battle for Bauska, 1944 ===
At the end of July 1944, Bauska fell into direct warfare for a month and a half. During the Red Army Offensive Operation Bagrations, the Red Army crossed the Latvian-Lithuanian border and approached Bauska on July 29. The city was of strategic importance as it blocked the road to Riga.

The German Army in the city was protected from rapid capture by the Battle Battalion formed on July 29 by the Chief of Bauska County and the Commander of the 13th Bauska Guard Regiment Major Janis Uuks. The 300 battalions were made up of guards and policemen from the 13th Bauska Guards Battalion, who were also volunteers and mobilized citizens. On July 29, the Uuluk Battalion took a defensive line on the banks of the Lielupe River opposite Bornsminde and launched a battle against the attacking Red Army soldiers. The city defenders were not sufficiently armed at the start of the fighting, and much of the automatic weaponry was acquired during the battle as war trophies from Soviet soldiers killed or captured.

On July 30, the 319-F Police Battalion reached Bauska and engaged in combat on July 31. The city was also defended by the 23rd and 322nd Battalions, which were part of the German Kampfgruppe of Otto Gieseke. On August 22, the 319-F Battalion had 318 soldiers, and on September 5, the Battalion left Bauska. The 322-F Battalion was formed in Riga only on July 26, and was sent to the battles in Lithuania after which they retreated to Bauska and took defensive positions along the Bauska-Ceraukste-Brunava line, but retreated to Jaunsaule in early September. At the end of July, the 23rd Gauja Battalion, in the 215th Infantry Division, engaged in battles near Bauska, was besieged and retreated to Kegums.

After the first three days of fighting, the Ukulu Battalion was replaced by the 380th German Grenadier Regiment, who for six weeks, along with Latvian Legionnaire and Police Battalion units, defended the city under Lieutenant Colonel Herba, who was awarded the Iron Cross Knight's Cross in mid-August. The Ukulu Battalion soldiers were distributed along these units and continued their defensive struggles. In addition to the German army, for six weeks one Latvian Legion, a guard battalion, and three Latvian Police Battalions repelled Red Army attempts to capture the city.

In the area of the bridge there was a defense plateau about 4 km wide and 1 km deep. The commander of the Red Army 1st Rifle Corps, General Vasilyev, was tasked with occupying the city. On the night of August 18, the Red Army's 179th Division troops moved to Lielupe and, on the morning of August 19, the 306th Division crossed over the Dirda after heavy artillery fire. The Red Army attacked the German fortifications at the Musa Bridge platoon, destroying them and occupying the train station. The Storm Battalion crossed the bridge, invaded the city and reached its center. The German army pulled in additional troops, Ferdinand and Tiger tanks and, after several hours of fighting, brought the Red Army to the south coast of Musa. Although the Red Army blasted the bridge, the Germans managed to cross the river and return to the defense platoon. The Germans reported that 400 Red Army were killed and 150 captured in the battle.

During the six-week battle, the Red Army unsuccessfully attempted to capture Bauska by crossing by the shallows of Dirda, Vimbu Pub, Bornsminde, and Mežotne. Soviet artillery fired on the city from Caucminde.

The civilian population of Bauska was evacuated from the city at the end of July, but a volunteer fire brigade continued to operate in the city and the brewery continued to operate. Rye was harvested in August. Police in the town maintained order in the city, commanded by Lieutenant Arvids Upmals. Artillery fired at Bauska Catholic Church Dean Joseph Maskvitis.

On September 11, Soviet aviation bombed the city. One-third of Bauska buildings were destroyed in these attacks (100 buildings destroyed, 300 with varying degrees of damage), and the Bauska State Gymnasium burned down. On the morning of September 14, a massive attack by Soviet land and air broke out, breaking the resistance of city defenders around noon.

== Postwar years ==
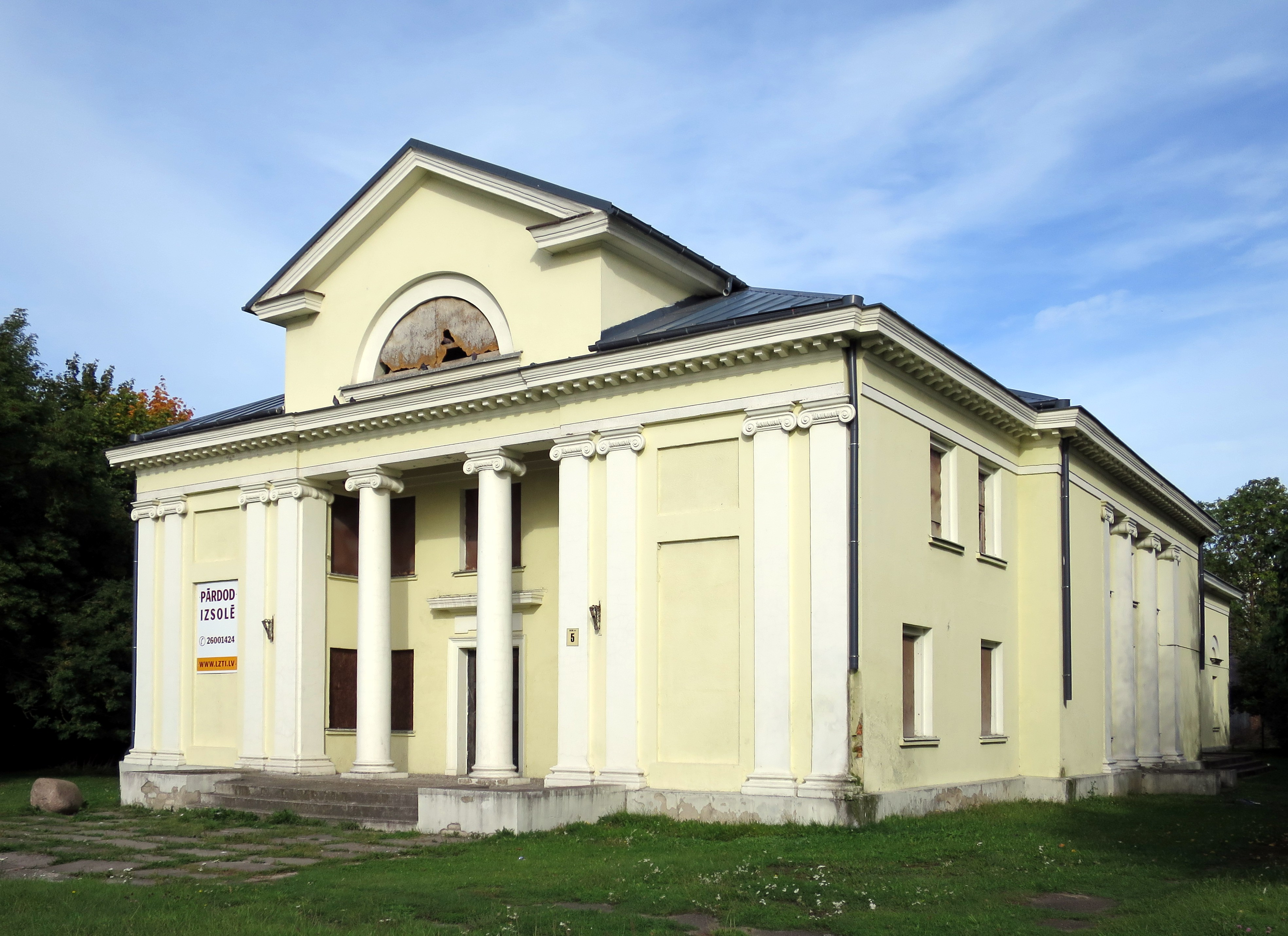
The movie theater "Victory" opened in 1954, a canonical Stalinist architecture building

Latvian partisans and anti-Soviet activists were active in Bauska and the region in the first post-war years, when they were attempting to resist Soviet occupation. From the autumn of 1948 until the summer of 1950 there was a Bauska Secondary School Youth National Resistance Organization led by Gunārs Zemtautis. It consisted of students in Riga and local youth. The organization issued several calls and planned attacks on Soviet officials. On September 15, 1949, members of the organization shot Zilla, the chairman of the "Code" collective farm. In the mid-1950s, the organization was destroyed and executives were sentenced to death.

On March 25, 1949, Soviet Operation Priboi started and 19 townspeople were deported to Siberia.

After the war, the ruins were slowly removed, the city rebuilt and it became the center of Bauska district. The present Kalna Street was called Padomju Street and in 1950 the House of Culture was opened with 600 seats. The Bauska Local History Museum was opened in the place of the former hotel. In 1951, 700 pupils began their studies at the renovated 1st high school. In 1954, the cinema "Victory" was opened and in 1959 the department store of the Bauska Consumer Society was opened. The old Market Square was transformed into October Square rallies with the Lenin Monument (1951), while the new Kolkhoz Market was created in 1950 in the place of the old town's ruined houses between Pludson and Industrial Streets. A canning-wine plant was built in place of the war-torn mill. In the former pastor's manor behind a pontoon bridge, a canning factory was established in 1946. A couple of kilometers from the town, a Bauska incubator and a poultry farm were established, starting a poultry farming industry. Sawmills continued to operate along the river. The city developed the food industry, including dairy and bakery factories and branches of the production associations "Latvijas canned" and "Latvijas Balzams", as well as the textile factory "Saule".

In 1958 the new Mūša bridge was opened, and in 1960 the Nemunėlis bridge was opened.

Bauska expanded into the former city meadows and swampy areas: apartment buildings, a second high school built in 1963, a bus station (1970), a hotel, a post office and a telephone exchange (1986). Immigrants from the USSR entered the city and the Russian-speaking population increased tenfold.

== Recent history ==
On October 22, 1988, the first Third Awakening rally "Against Migration" took place in Bauska. On August 23, 1989, a Baltic Way chain of people swept through the city.

In 1999, the first Bauska Country Music Festival took place. In 2000, the extension and reconstruction of the Nemunėlis Bridge were completed. In 2013, the renovation of the Town Hall was completed. In 2014, the reconstruction of Mūša Bridge was completed.
