= Ivars Grantiņš =

Latvian serial killer and rapist

- Born: 1972 (age 53–54); Ceraukste, Bauska Municipality, Latvian SSR
- Other names: "The Ceraukste Maniac" "The Ceraukste Butcher"
- Conviction: Murder x3
- Penalty: Life imprisonment

Details
- Victims: 3
- Span of crimes: 27 June – 26 August 2008
- Country: Latvia
- State: Bauska
- Date apprehended: 29 August 2008

Ivars Grantiņš (born 1972), known as The Ceraukste Maniac (Latvian: Ceraukstes Maniaks), is a Latvian serial killer and rapist who murdered three people, including his daughter, in a two-month killing spree in 2008. The brutality of his crimes and his subsequent manhunt became notorious in the country, and he was subsequently convicted and sentenced to life imprisonment for them.

== Early life ==
Ivars Grantiņš was born in 1972 in the village of Ceraukste, the second son of Ausma Timpares and an unnamed father. His father lived with the family until Grantiņš was four years old, and during that time, he paid little attention to his children and spent his time drinking and having affairs. When he was imprisoned following a drunken brawl, Ausma divorced Grantiņš' father and took custody of their children.

Grantiņš was raised on a kolkhoz farm, where his mother worked manual labour to provide for her three children, and it is said that she treated them with love and care. At age six, Grantiņš was hit by a car and suffered an open leg fracture, for which he had to be hospitalized for a long time. Eventually, due to his long hospitalization and poor performance at the local school, his mother transferred him to another school in Svitene. As it was far away from his home village, he frequently travelled by bus and could only return home on the weekends.

While studying there, Grantiņš was bullied by older children for his short frame, perceived emotional behaviour and constant attention-seeking from teachers. This extended to the playground, where he had trouble connecting with his peers and was often by himself. Whenever he was offended, he would sit by himself on a staircase and refuse to move, which sometimes resulted in other students having to forcefully remove him.

As he grew older, Grantiņš' peers started to accept him, but his behaviour started to become increasingly aggressive. Reportedly, he was very competitive and could not stand losing, and often competed to be the most proactive when it came to fieldwork. At either 15 or 16, he was caught stealing women's underwear and other clothing from a clothesline and arranging them in a strange manner. After being denounced for the thefts, his mother was forced to pay for the stolen property.

=== Early crimes ===
Grantiņš' first crime was committed in 1988, when he confronted a 17-year-old girl he had taken a liking to while she attempted to make a phone call. After opening a gate for her, he hit her on the back of the head and attempted to strangle her, but the victim managed to escape his clutches and tried to run away. She eventually lost consciousness and collapsed, however, allowing Grantiņš time to pull out a pocket knife and stab her in the hand and back, but was stopped by a neighbour who had been alerted by the commotion.

In spite of the nature of the attack, Grantiņš was given a 2 1/2-year suspended sentence and was even allowed to stay in the same house as the victim. She would later claim that he felt no remorse about the act, and even mocked her for being unable to do anything. Some time later, he attacked another girl living in the kolkhoz while she waited at the bus stop, but was prevented from strangling her by other residents.

=== Marriage and further attacks ===
After graduating from Svitene, Grantiņš enrolled at an agricultural vocational school in Mežotne to study as a tractor driver, but soon dropped out. He soon found employment at a farm in Ceraukste Parish, where he was tasked with feeding the cattle. While he was considered a good and efficient worker, female co-workers were disturbed by his tendency to torture the farm animals out of boredom and molest older women. He was first tried for attempted sexual assault on a minor and attempted murder in 1995, but was prevented from finishing the victim off by passers-by. At that time, he was given a suspended sentence.

Eventually, Grantiņš married Inga, another girl living on the kolkhoz who was seven years his junior, and the pair soon had a daughter, Daina. His wife allegedly held great influence over him, so much so that Grantiņš obeyed everything she requested without questioning it. One day, after Inga had a quarrel with his mother, Grantiņš grabbed an axe and attacked the latter, for which he was later arrested and sentenced to three years and a half in prison. After the conviction, Inga divorced him and took custody of their child. Following his release, Grantiņš refused to apologize to his mother, despite the fact that she constantly provided him with money while he was still inside.

Grantiņš then moved to Riga for about two years, where he found a well-paying job in the construction industry. During this time, he did inquire about the well-being of his family and preferred to spend time with friends, even helping one of them with paying his bills. In 2004, Grantiņš was sentenced to four years imprisonment and one year of supervised parole for rape—‌on this occasion, he raped and beat a woman he had met at a party and had offered to accompany her to her home. In a letter written to a childhood friend, he complained about the conditions and prison and claimed that he was 'humiliated'.

On 11 April 2008, Grantiņš was released from prison and returned to his mother's house in Ceraukste, where he began working at a local farm. According to his mother, he had become even more withdrawn than before—‌he would only greet her in the morning and evenings, and after returning from work, he would immediately go to his room. She also said that his hair had prematurely turned grey during his prison stint, which prompted him to dye it black. His daughter, who still lived with her mother in Bauska, would occasionally visit them during the summer holidays during this period.

== Murders ==
=== Inga Lomakina ===
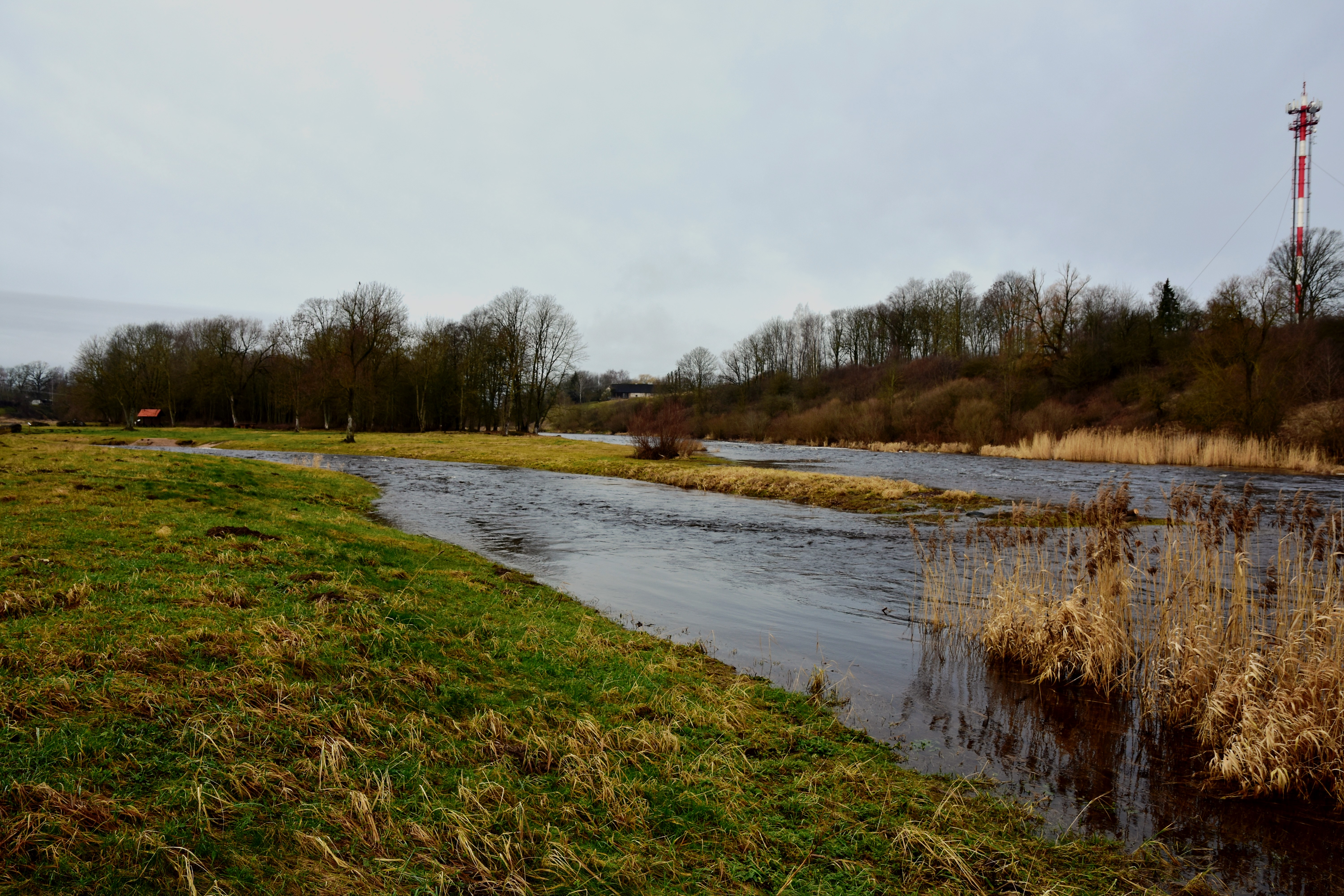
Ķirbaksala — the place where Grantiņš buried his wife's corpse

After his release from prison, Grantiņš attempted to reconcile with his ex-wife, who by then had remarried and had two more children from her new husband, Ivars Lomakin. At the time, the couple were living separately and Inga frequently had affairs with other men, eventually allowing Grantiņš back into her life. In early June, he moved into the apartment, and unlike her previous boyfriends, Inga's neighbours described Grantiņš as a very calm person. The pair would often get up early and travel to Iecava, where they worked at a local farm.

On 27 June, Inga mysteriously disappeared, and Grantiņš soon moved out of the apartment. When a neighbour questioned him about what happened to his wife, he claimed that she had gone to work as a prostitute in Riga. His claims were readily accepted by most, and soon after, Inga's children from her second marriage were taken in by relatives. A few days later, Inga's brother received a text message, purportedly written by her, that she had travelled abroad to Ireland and wanted Daina to be taken in by her father and grandmother in Ceraukste Parish.

Unbeknownst to the neighbours, Grantiņš had strangled Inga in the apartment's kitchen, drained her blood and later dismembered her remains, which he later buried in Ķirbaksala, behind the ruins of an old castle. At the time, her children were inside the apartment but were apparently asleep and did not hear the commotion. Later on, Grantiņš would claim that his motive was that Inga refused to continue living with him. When her remains were eventually recovered, authorities found that the remains had been chopped up into 50 pieces and the skull had been split in two. Grantiņš had also poured cement over the dump site, placed a stick on it, and burned her belongings back at the apartment's stove.

=== Jana Ribinska ===
Following his wife's apparent disappearance, Grantiņš began drinking excessively and exhibited strange behaviour. One of his daughter's friends later recalled that he rarely changed clothing and often loudly sang songs about how some evil 'oil men' were going to kill everyone.

On 20 July, Grantiņš attended an acquaintance's drinking party in Ceraukste, where he came across 18-year-old Jana Ribinska. After getting into a scuffle, he was eventually kicked out of the house. About half an hour later, the party ended and Ribinska, unwilling to go home just yet, decided to go to Bauska to drink some more. On the way, she crossed paths with Grantiņš, who raped and then drowned her in a pond (other sources claimed that he stabbed her multiple times with a knife). After the murder, he dismembered the body and buried the remains in the nearby forest.

=== Murder of daughter, flight, and arrest ===
Grantiņš continued living in Ceraukste together with his mother and 11-year-old daughter Daina. On the evening of 26 August, while his daughter was still sleeping, he entered her room and sexually assaulted her. Daina attempted to fight back, but was unsuccessful. A few minutes later, Grantiņš returned to her room with a knife, cut her throat and then performed anal intercourse on the corpse. In the middle of the night, Grantiņš' mother found the dead girl and went to the neighbours for help. By the time the police arrived, Grantiņš had already fled.

It was assumed that Grantiņš was hiding in the forest near Ceraukste, but a search of the area turned up nothing. During the search, suspicions were raised about other criminal offences potentially committed by the fugitive, including the mysterious disappearance of his wife. Journalists from LNT's "Degpunktā" radio programme were able to contact Grantiņš by phone, and during the interview, he could be heard driving on the motorway. Grantiņš stated that he had just come out of a shop in Jūrmala, and readily confessed to the murder.

Three days later, on 29 August at 10 pm, Grantiņš was arrested without incident at a half-collapsed barn in Gailīši Parish near the Lithuanian border. After confessing to the two other murders, he was charged with three counts of first-degree murder. A search of his belongings revealed a large number of videos depicting either pornographic or violent sexual acts.

== Trial and imprisonment ==
On 18 May 2009, he was found guilty on all counts and sentenced to life imprisonment. He appealed the verdict to the Supreme Court, arguing that he had converted to Christianity, regretted his decisions and that the death penalty was a preferable option to life imprisonment. His arguments were rejected by the Court, which subsequently upheld the verdict.

== See also ==
- List of serial killers by country
