= Uzvara =

Village in Latvia

- Location within Latvia
- Coordinates: 56°18′57.6″N 24°15′15.5″E
- Country: Latvia
- Municipality: Bauska
- Parish: Gailīši
- Elevation: 30 m (98 ft)

Population (2015)
  - Total: 1,044
- Postal code: LV-3931 Uzvara
- Website: https://www.gailisi.lv

Uzvara (former/current names include Dvari and Kamarde) is a large village in the Gailīši parish of Bauska Municipality located in southern Latvia. The village is situated on the left bank of the river Mūsa, 12 kilometers from the municipal capital of Bauska.

The village was founded on the former land of the Dvari manor after the Second World War as the central settlement of the kolkhoz "Uzvara" (victory in Latvian) in 1947. The village also serves as the center of Gailīši parish, also encompassing the Uzvara Secondary School, kindergarten, cultural center "Kamarde", a post office, doctor's office, library, various shops and enterprises.
