= Rundāle Municipality =

Municipality of Latvia

Coordinates: 56°25′12″N 24°00′35″E

Rundāle Municipality Rundāles novads
- Municipality
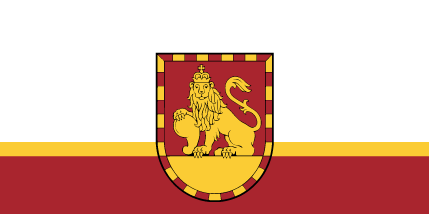
- Flag Coat of arms

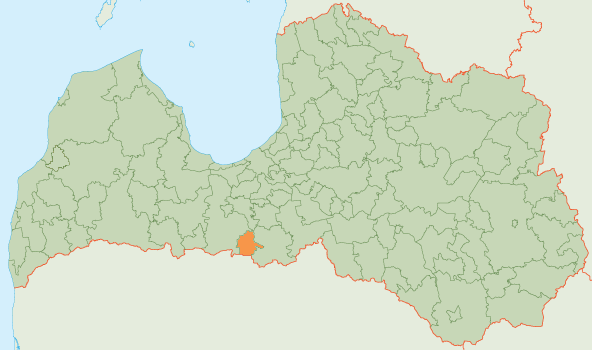
- Country: Latvia
- Formed: 2009
- Centre: Pilsrundāle

Government
  - Council Chair: Aivars Okmanis (For People and the Land/NA)

Area
  - Total: 231.39 km^{2} (89.34 sq mi)
  - Land: 227.12 km^{2} (87.69 sq mi)
  - Water: 4.27 km^{2} (1.65 sq mi)

Population (2021)
  - Total: 3,290
  - Density: 14.5/km^{2} (37.5/sq mi)
- Website: www.rundale.lv

Rundāle Municipality (Latvian: Rundāles novads) is a former municipality in Semigallia, Latvia. The municipality was formed in 2009 by merging Rundāle Parish, Svitene Parish and Viesturi Parish, the administrative centre being Pilsrundāle. The population in 2020 was 3,307.

It was located in the south-east of Latvia and is only 15 km (9.3 mi) from the town Bauska and 80 km (49.7 mi) from Latvian capital Riga.

The centre of the former municipality, Pilsrundāle, is the location of the Rundāle Palace, a famous tourist destination and one of the most notable Latvian chateaus.

On 1 July 2021, Rundāle Municipality ceased to exist and its territory was merged with Bauska Municipality.

== See also ==
- Administrative divisions of Latvia (2009)
