= Mežotne Parish =

Parish of Latvia

- parish of Latvia
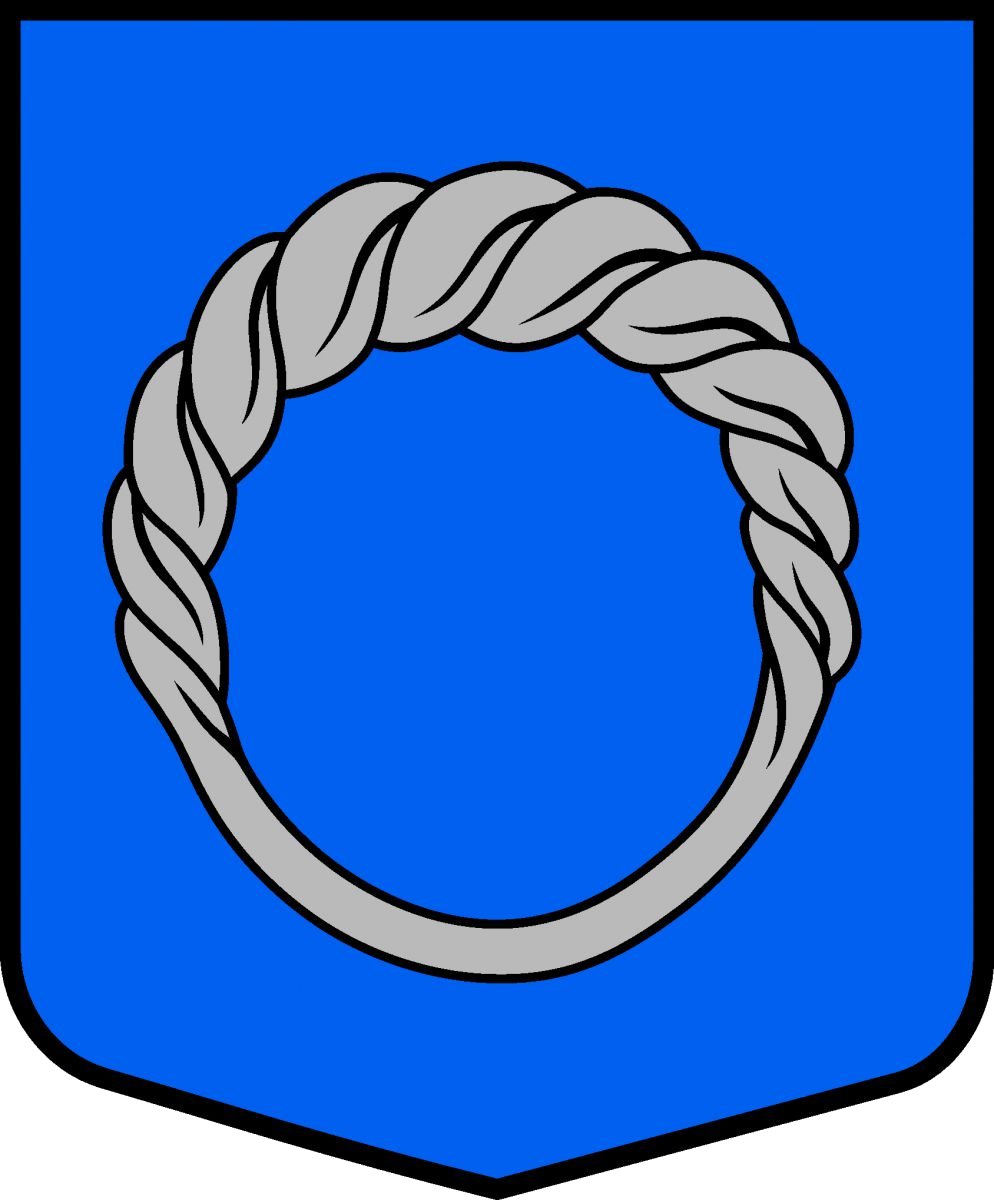
- Coat of arms

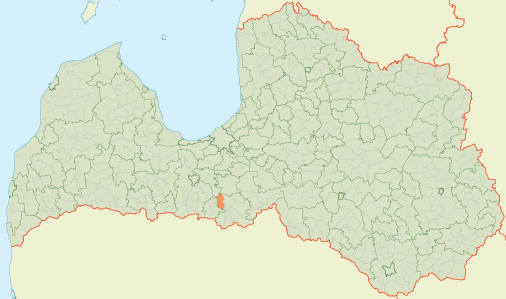
- Coordinates: 56°28′18″N 24°06′10″E
- Country: Latvia

Area
  - Total: 75.53 km^{2} (29.16 sq mi)

Population (1 January 2026)
  - Total: 1,265
- Time zone: Eastern European Time
- Website: https://www.mezotne.lv

Mežotne Parish (Latvian: Mežotnes pagasts) is an administrative unit of Bauska Municipality in the Semigallia region of Latvia.

== Towns, villages, and settlements of Mežotne parish ==
- Mežotne
- Ceplis, Garoza, Jumprava, Strēlnieki, Bērzmuiža

== Notable people ==
- Jānis Alberts Jansons (1892–1971), Latvian folklorist, literary scholar and educator
- Christoph Johann von Medem
- Dorothea von Medem (1761–1821), Duchess of Courland
- Arnolds Neibuts (1889—1919), Latvian revolutionary
- Eduards Strautnieks (1886—1946), Latvian lawyer and public figure
