= Brunava Parish =

Parish of Latvia

- parish of Latvia
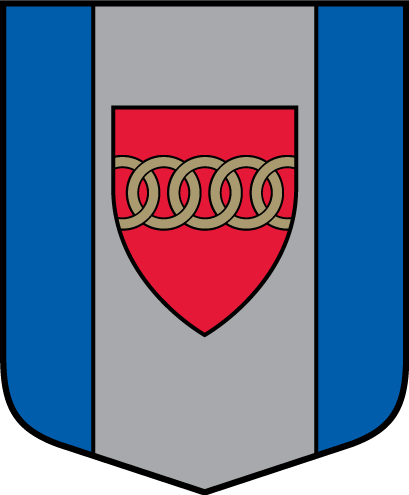
- Coat of arms

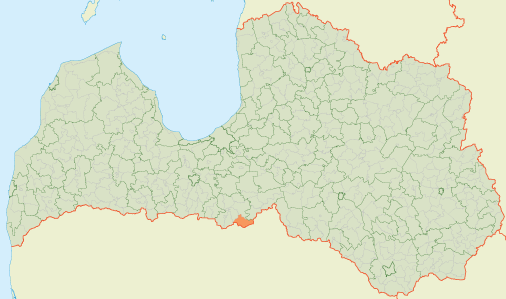
- 56°18′30″N 24°25′54″E
- Country: Latvia

Area
  - Total: 111.83 km^{2} (43.18 sq mi)
  - Land: 109.59 km^{2} (42.31 sq mi)
  - Water: 2.24 km^{2} (0.86 sq mi)

Population (1 January 2024)
  - Total: 1,172
  - Density: 10/km^{2} (27/sq mi)

Brunava Parish (Latvian: Brunavas pagasts) is an administrative unit of Bauska Municipality in the Semigallia region of Latvia.
