= Medem (surname) =

Medem is a surname. Notable people with the surname include:

- Christoph Johann von Medem (1763–1838), nobleman from Courland and courtier in the courts of Prussian kings
- Dorothea von Medem (1761–1821), Countess, Duchess of Courland, popularly known as Dorothea of Courland
- Friedrich Johann Graf von Medem (1912–1984), German-born zoologist who emigrated to Colombia, representative of the IUCN Crocodiles Specialist Group for South America
- Julio Medem (born 1958), Spanish screenwriter and film director
- Pavel Medem (1800–1854), Russian diplomat and privy councillor
- Rudolph von Medem (1846–unknown), German-born soldier in the U.S. Army who served during the Indian Wars
- Stephan Medem (born 1960), Swiss former professional tennis player
- Vladimir Medem (1879–1923), Russian Jewish politician and ideologue of the Jewish Labour Bund, eponym of the Medem library
