= Bārbele Parish =

Parish of Latvia

- parish of Latvia
- Coat of arms

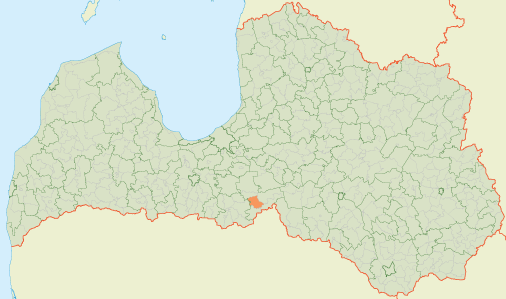
- 56°27′46″N 24°36′41″E
- Country: Latvia

Area
  - Total: 97.94 km^{2} (37.81 sq mi)
  - Land: 96 km^{2} (37 sq mi)
  - Water: 1.94 km^{2} (0.75 sq mi)

Population (1 January 2024)
  - Total: 715
  - Density: 7.3/km^{2} (19/sq mi)

Bārbele Parish (Latvian: Bārbeles pagasts) is an administrative unit of Bauska Municipality in the Semigallia region of Latvia.
