= Christoph Johann von Medem =

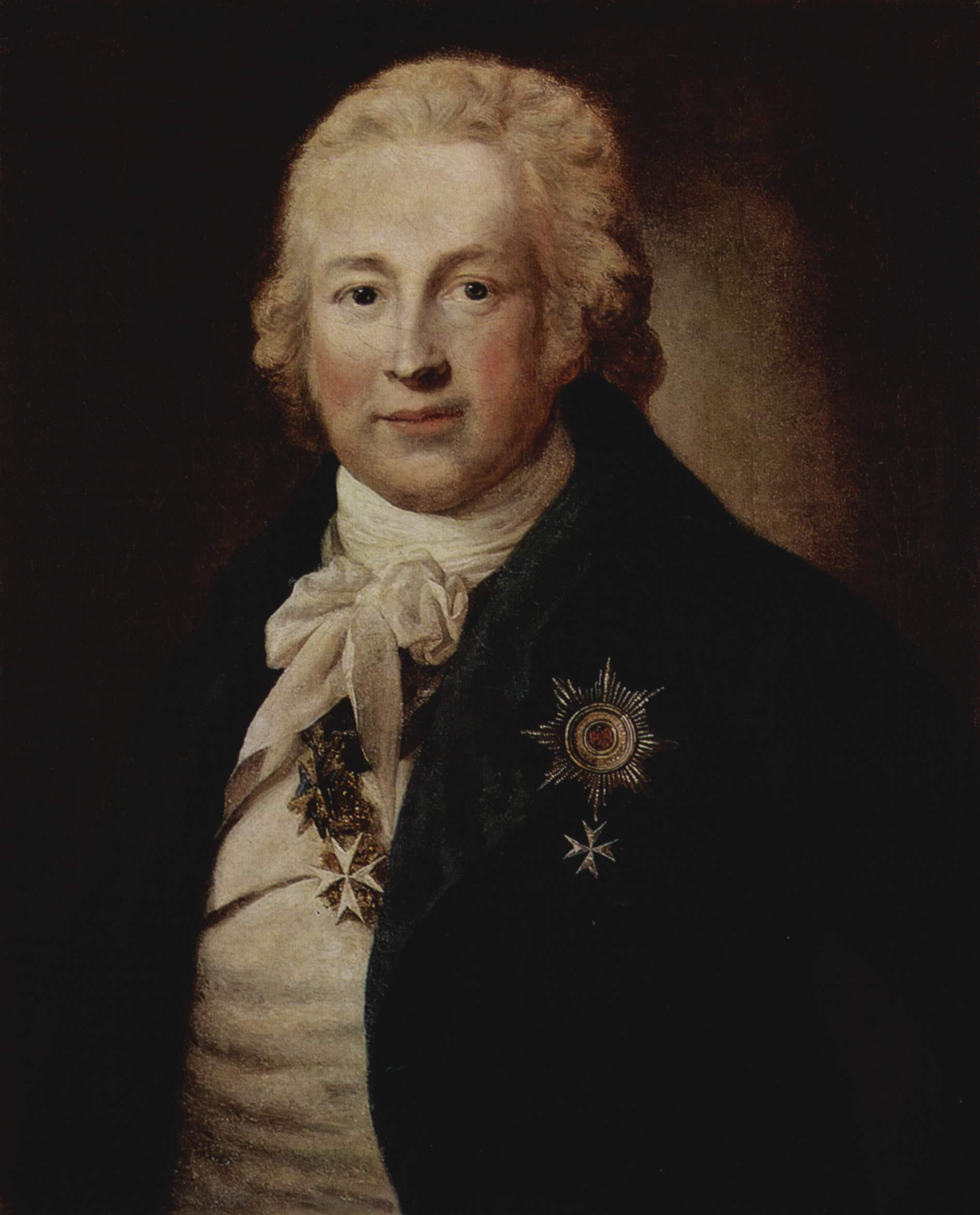
- Christoph Johann Friedrich Graf von Medem portrait by Anton Graff (1796)
- Born: 13 August 1763; Mežotne, Duchy of Courland and Semigallia
- Died: 24 February 1838 (aged 74); Mitau, Russian Empire
- House: Medem
- Father: Johann Friedrich von Medem
- Mother: Luise Charlotte von Manteuffel

Count Christoph Johann Friedrich von Medem (Jeannot Medem; 1763–1838) was a nobleman from Courland and courtier in the courts of Prussian kings Frederick the Great, Frederick William II and Emperor of Russia Paul I. His sisters were poet Elisa von der Recke and last Duchess of Courland, Dorothea von Medem.

== Early life ==
Christoph Johan von Medem was born in the Mežotne manor, Semigallia on 13 August 1763. He was the son of a well known landlord and Reichsgraf Johann Friedrich von Medem and his second wife Luise Charlotte von Manteuffel. He had a good education and with help from his father he became a courtier in the court of the Friedrich the Great.

== Career ==
Christoph Johann von Medem also served in Prussian army. After Frederick the Great death in 1786 he became aide of his son Frederick William II of Prussia. Later after his patron's death in 1797 he moved to St. Petersburg in the service of Paul I of Russia. He was his chamberlain and also served as ambassador in Washington in 1796–1808. As Captain and Adjutant of the General Nikolay Raevsky Medem acquired on September 6, 1813, during the German Campaign of 1813 the Order Pour le Mérite.

== Later life ==
After retirement he returned to Semigallia (where he owned several manors) and turned to agriculture. He married Mary Luise, a daughter of Count Peter Ludwig von der Pahlen. Their residences included lv:Villa Medem in Mitau and the Durbe Manor near Tukums. Christoph Johann von Medem died in Mitau on 24 February 1838.
