= Dāviņi Parish =

Parish of Latvia

- parish of Latvia
- Coat of arms

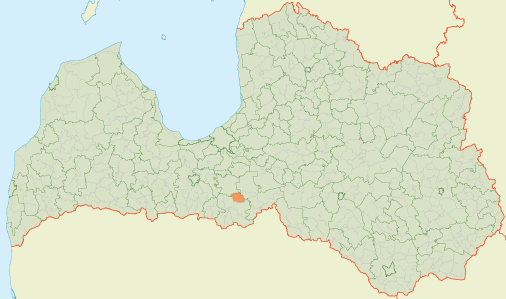
- 56°30′05″N 24°21′21″E
- Country: Latvia

Area
  - Total: 80.80 km^{2} (31.20 sq mi)
  - Land: 79.33 km^{2} (30.63 sq mi)
  - Water: 1.47 km^{2} (0.57 sq mi)

Population (1 January 2024)
  - Total: 590
  - Density: 7.3/km^{2} (19/sq mi)

Dāviņi Parish (Latvian: Dāviņu pagasts) is an administrative unit of Bauska Municipality in the Semigallia region of Latvia.
