= Svitene Parish =

Parish of Latvia

- parish of Latvia
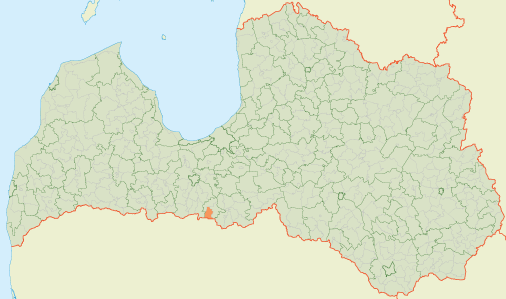
- Coordinates: 56°22′29″N 23°55′47″E
- Country: Latvia

Population (1 January 2026)
  - Total: 646

Svitene Parish (Latvian: Svitenes pagasts) is an administrative unit of Bauska Municipality in the Semigallia region of Latvia.

== Towns, villages and settlements of Svitene Parish ==
- Svitene - parish administrative center
