= Lischke (settlement) =

Old Prussian settlement

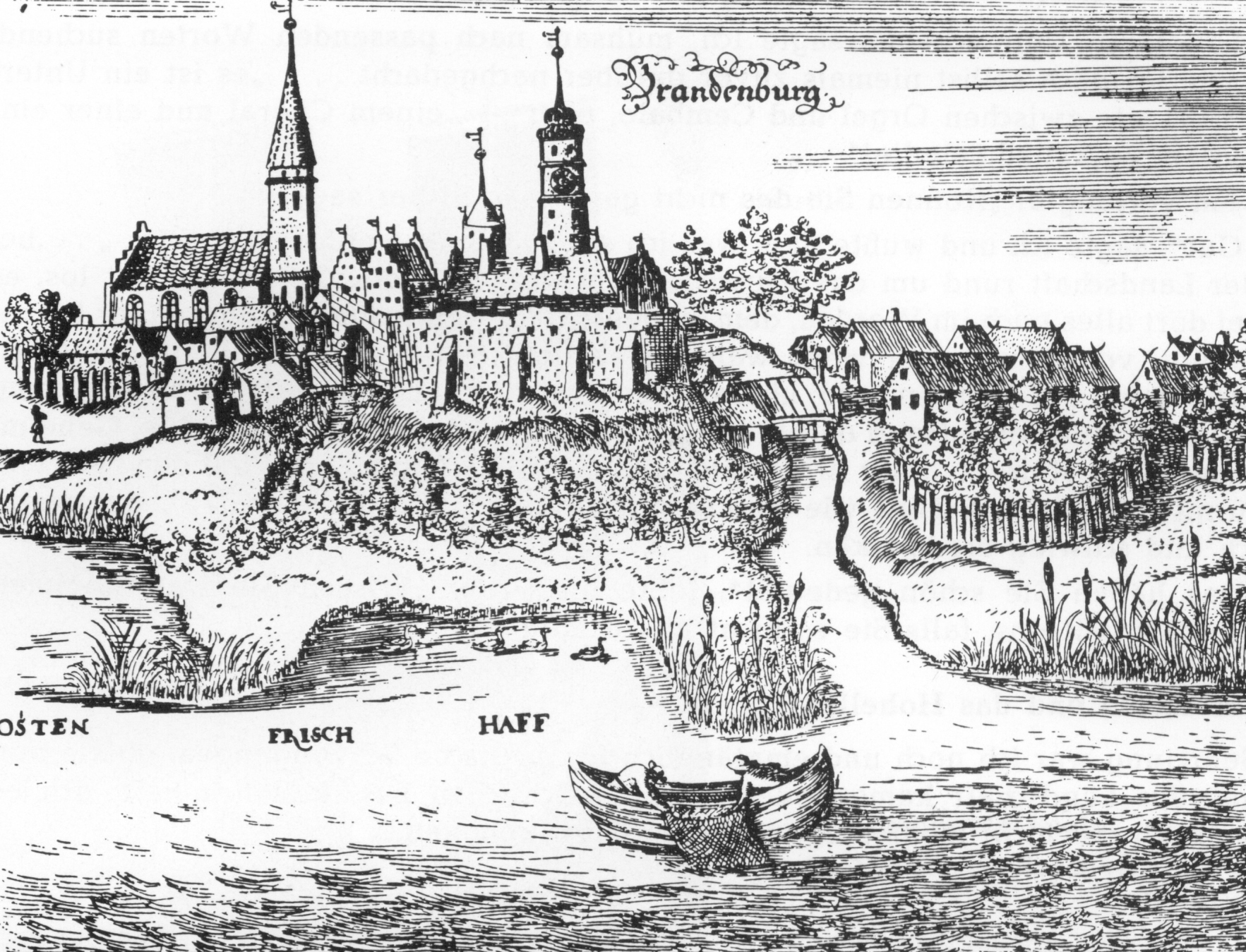
Brandenburg castle and a lischke by Vistula Lagoon

Lischke (lisca, liske) was a type of Old Prussian settlement. Lischkes were spontaneously grown settlements in geographically strategic places, so that often they have grown into towns. Often they grew under the protection of castles. The population was mainly innkeepers, craftsmen and merchants.

== Etymology ==
The word entered German language during the invasion of Teutonic Knights into the lands of Old (Baltic) Prussians and is derived from Old Prussian liscis / liskis, which in this context means "camp". The direct meaning of the word, common to Baltic languages, is "nest", and in German the word "Lischke" also retained in the meaning of a basket without wooden handle worn on a cord over shoulder.

== See also ==
- Posad
