= Gailīši Parish =

Parish of Latvia

- Coat of arms

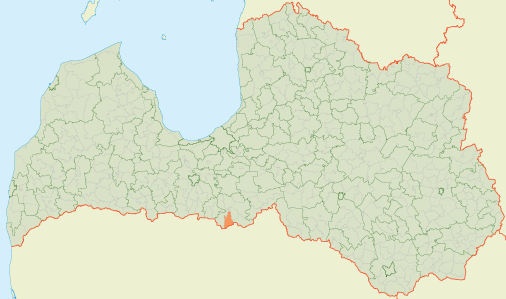
- Interactive map of Gailīši Parish
- Coordinates: 56°19′03″N 24°12′49″E
- Country: Latvia
- Municipality: Bauska

Area
  - Total: 80.26 km^{2} (30.99 sq mi)

Population (1 January 2026)
  - Total: 1,829
  - Density: 22.79/km^{2} (59.02/sq mi)
- Time zone: Eastern European Time

Gailīši Parish (Latvian: Gailīšu pagasts) is an administrative unit of Bauska Municipality in the Semigallia region of Latvia.
