= Ceraukste Parish =

Parish of Latvia

- parish of Latvia
- Coat of arms

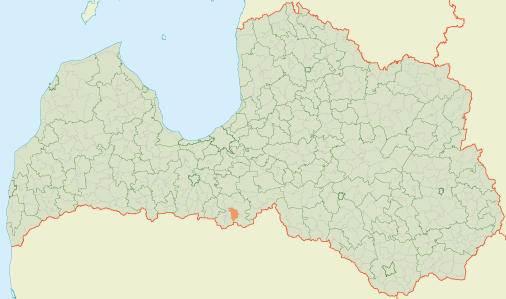
- 56°22′18″N 24°17′47″E
- Country: Latvia

Area
  - Total: 66.64 km^{2} (25.73 sq mi)
  - Land: 64.8 km^{2} (25.0 sq mi)
  - Water: 1.84 km^{2} (0.71 sq mi)

Population (1 January 2024)
  - Total: 1,337
  - Density: 20/km^{2} (52/sq mi)

Ceraukste Parish (Latvian: Ceraukstes pagasts) is an administrative unit of Bauska Municipality in the Semigallia region of Latvia.
