= Bauska Castle =

Castle in Latvia

- Bauska, Latvia
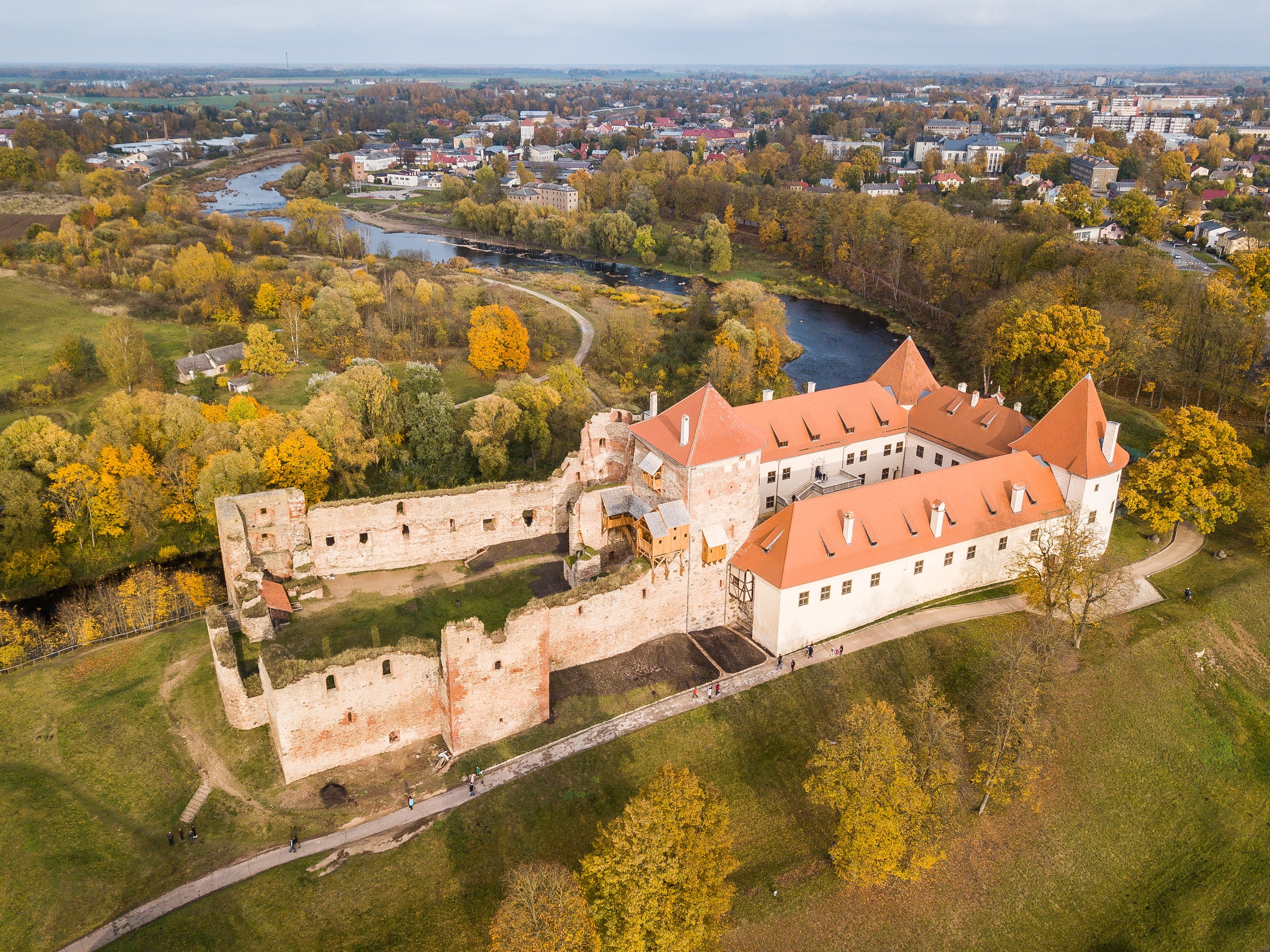

Site information
- Type: Castle
- Open to the public: Yes
- Condition: Partly restored.
- Website: Bauska Castle and Museum

Location
- Coordinates: 56°24′13″N 24°10′25″E

Site history
- Built: 15th.- 16th. century.
- Built by: Livonian order

Bauska Castle (Latvian: Bauskas pils; German: Schloss Bauske) is a Livonian order castle consisting of the ruins of an earlier castle and a later palace on the outskirts of the Latvian city of Bauska. While originally a hill fort, the Livonian branch of the Teutonic Knights built the castle in the fifteenth century, the palace was added in the sixteenth century, and partial restoration began in 2008

== History ==
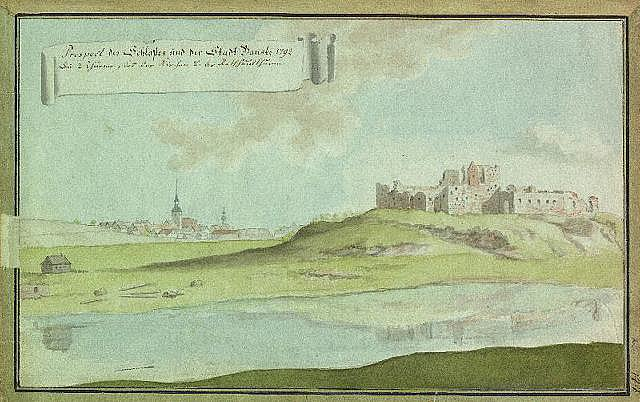
Castle ruins in 1792

The castle stands on the narrow peninsula at the confluence of the rivers Mūša and Mēmele where they form the Lielupe river. In ancient times, the hill was the site of a Semigallian fortress. The first stone buildings were established between 1438 and 1450 by the Livonian branch of the Teutonic Knights or traditionally, 1443 when the construction year was mentioned in the Master's letter, and construction continued till the end of the 16th century. The old section of the castle featured a great watch tower, 3.5 meter thick walls, a prison under the tower, a garrison and a drawbridge at the gates.

Construction started under the rule of the Master of the Livonian Order, Heidenreich Vinke von Overberg (1439 – 1450). The castle was intended to strengthen the Order's power over Semigallia, to protect the border with the Grand Duchy of Lithuania and to control the trade route from Lithuania to Riga. The castle was both the military stronghold and the administrative centre of the area.

In a treaty of alliance in 1559, the Livonian Order passed sovereignty of the town and the castle to Poland. Archbishop of Riga Wilhelm von Brandenburg was in possession of the castle when the Livonian Order collapsed in 1562, and the castle was turned over to Gotthard Kettler when he became the first Duke of Courland, and it became one of the main ducal residences. In 1568, 1590 and 1601 the Landtags of Duchy of Courland and Semigallia were held here. Under Duke Friedrich, a new wing was added in 1590 with additional expansion in 1599, creating a modern residence with two massive round towers.

During the Polish-Lithuanian wars with Sweden, Gustavus Adolphus captured the castle on 17 September 1625, thoroughly looting the "safeguarded" treasures of the surrounding nobility that had been stored there.

Bauska Castle, during the reign of Duke Jacob, underwent repair of windows, doors, stoves, and modernized fortifications in 1647.

In 1706, during the Great Northern War, both castle and palace were blown up by the retreating Russians and left unrestored. More than 150 years later, in 1874, Prince Paul von Lieven purchased the ruins and began their restoration.

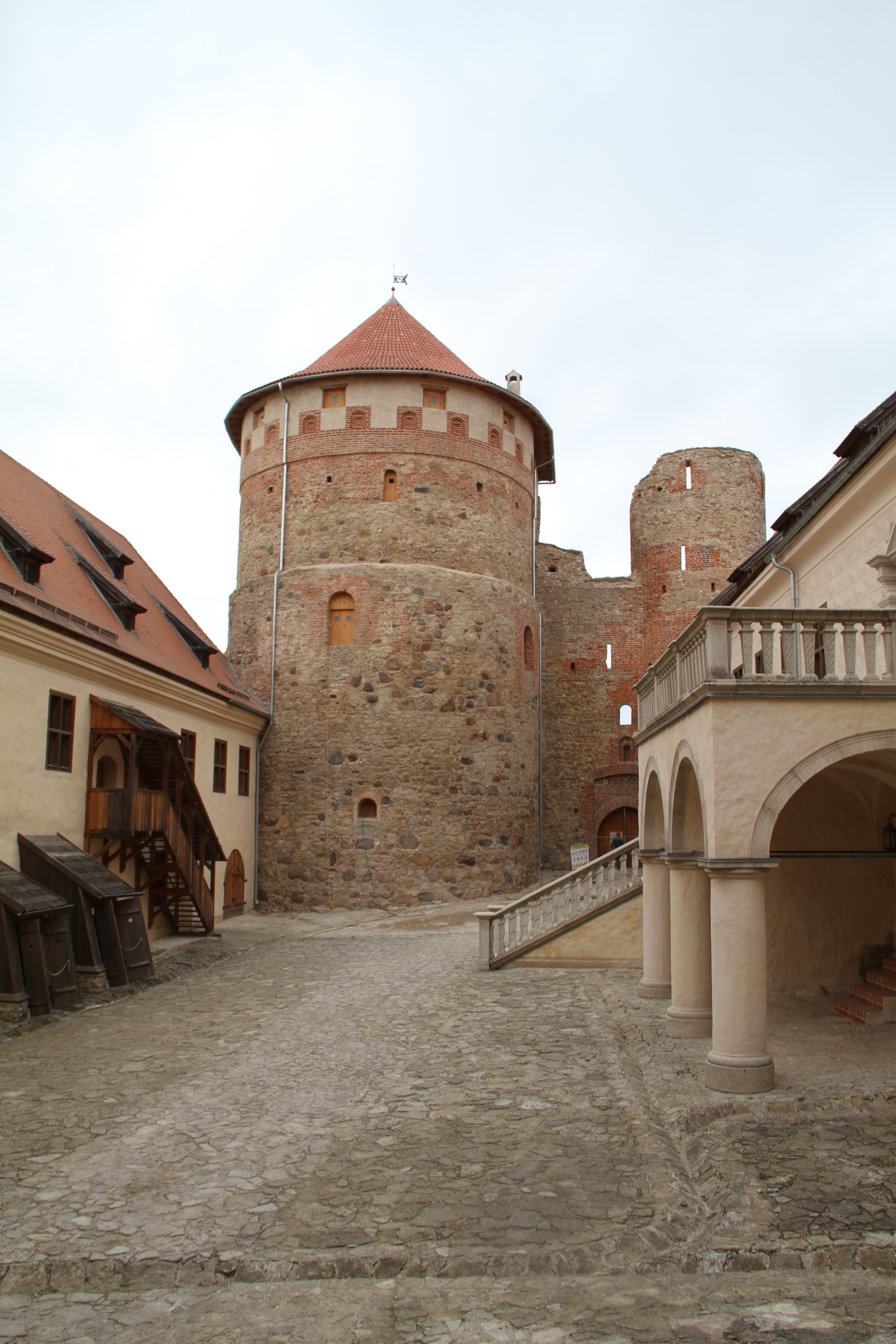
Castle courtyard in 2020

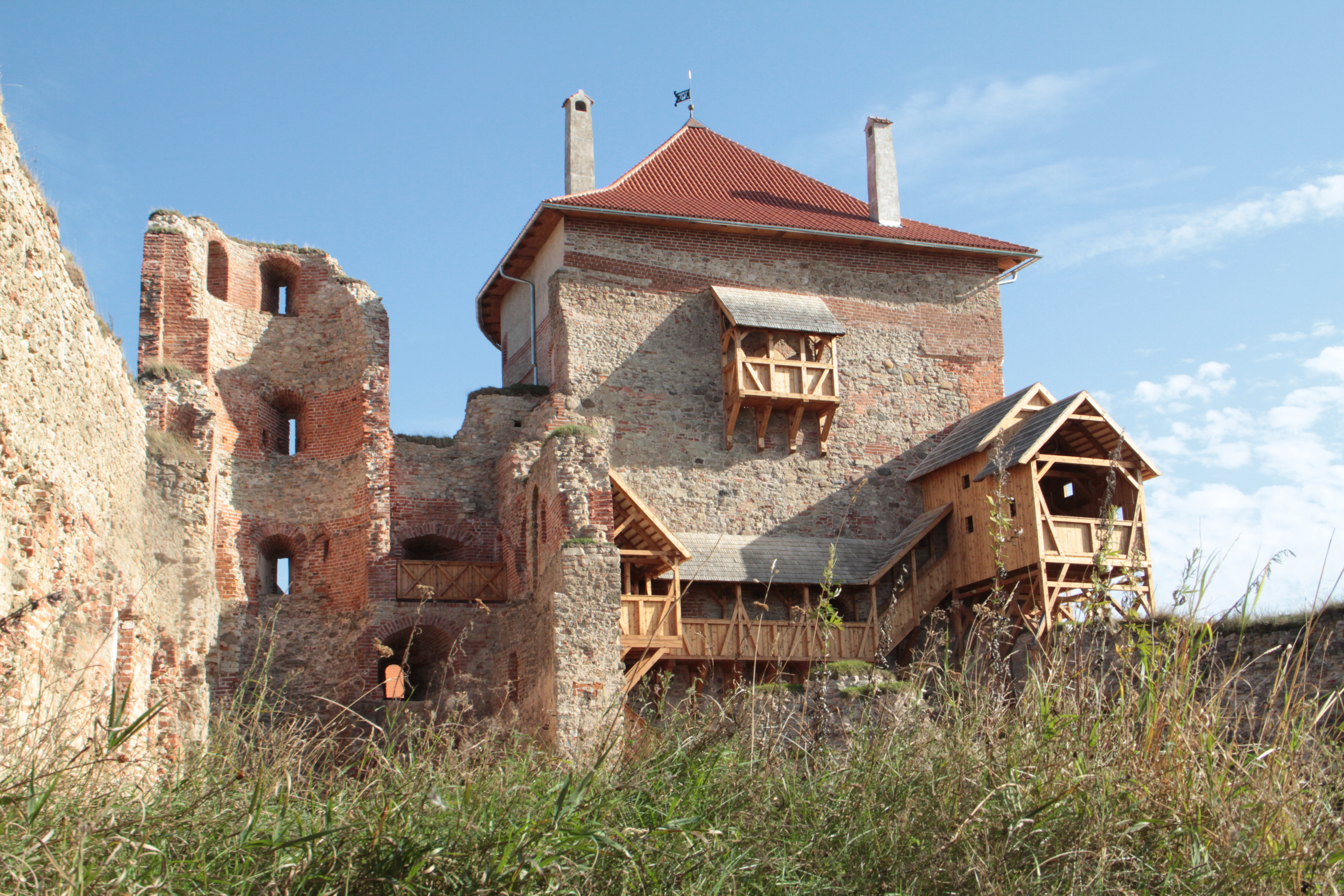
The inner courtyard of the unrestored half of the Castle

== Today ==
Only ruins remain from the seat of the Livonian order. The palace, however, is fully restored and can be visited daily during the summer months. Visitors can explore the castle, visit the museum, eat in the café and climb the castle keep lookout tower, which has a panoramic view of the surrounding city and countryside.
