= Mežotne =

Town in Latvia

Coordinates: 56°26′N 24°03′E

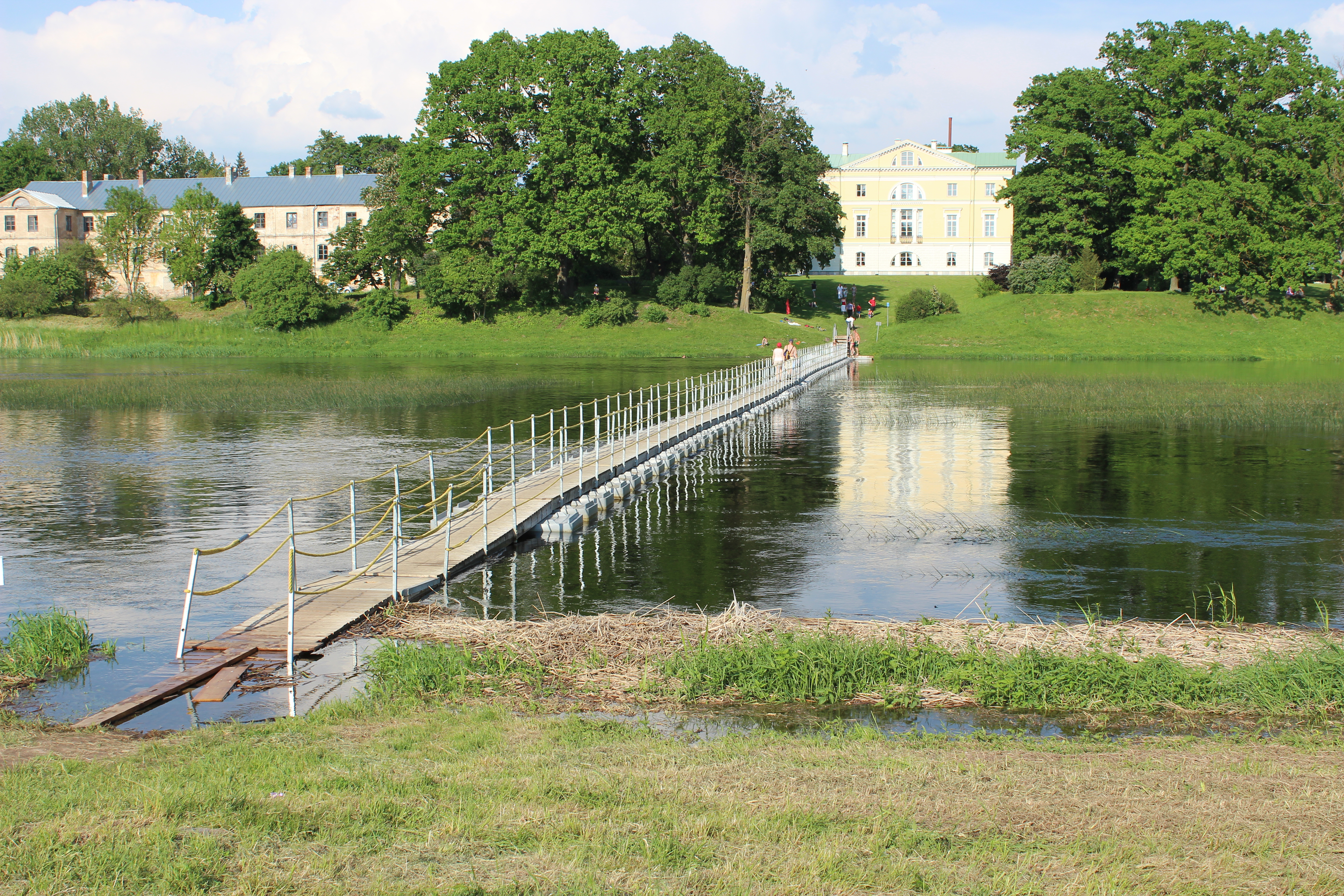
View towards Mežotne Palace from the bank of Lielupe River

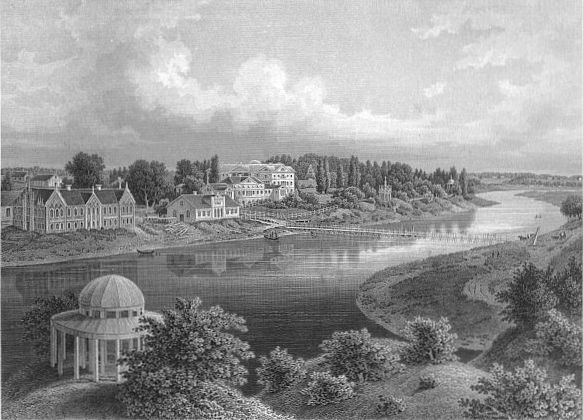
View of Mežotne (Mesothen) in the 19th century

Mežotne (German: Mesothen) is a village in the Mežotne Parish of Bauska Municipality in the Semigallia region of Latvia, 10 km west of Bauska and 40 km south of the capital of Latvia, Riga. It is located on the left bank of the Lielupe river near the Lithuanian border.

== Mežotne Palace ==
An ancient Semigallian castle mound is located near Mežotne. Mežotne Palace was the former Lieven family estate and now serves as the main residence of Freemasonry Grand Lodge of Latvia. Countess, later Princess Dorothea von Lieven, a noblewoman and wife of Prince Christopher Lieven, Russian ambassador to London called "Sibylle of the European Diplomacy" was buried in the family cemetery near the palace.

Dorothea von Medem, Countess of Courland was born there in 1761.

== See also ==
- Bauska Municipality#Notable people
- People from Mežotne
