= Bauska Municipality =

Municipality of Latvia

Coordinates: 56.4167°N 24.2833°E

Bauska Municipality Bauskas novads
- Municipality
- Flag Coat of arms

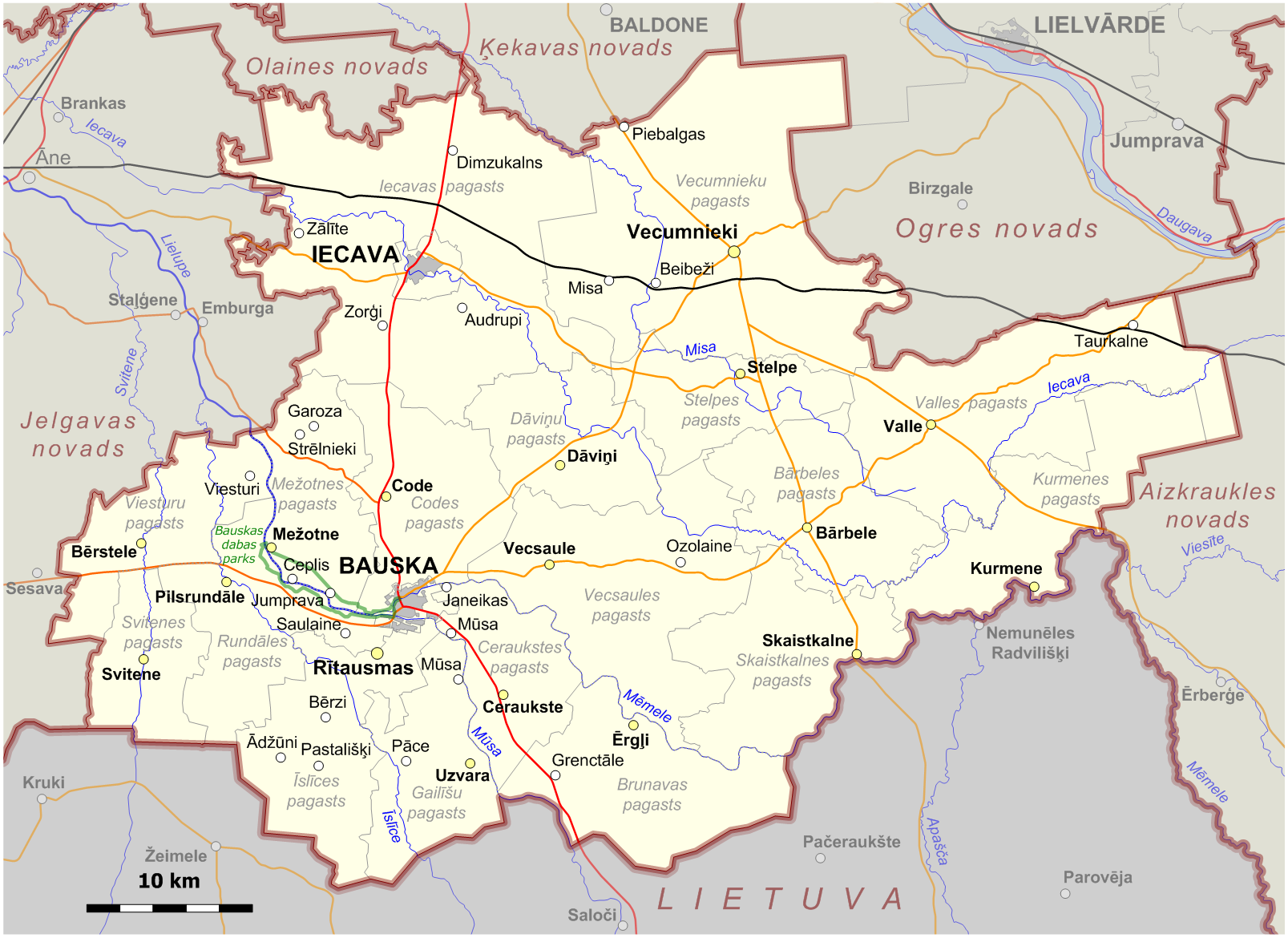
- Country: Latvia
- Formed: 2009
- Reformed: 2021
- Centre: Bauska

Government
  - Council Chair: Aivars Mačeks (NA)

Area
  - Total: 2,174.92 km^{2} (839.74 sq mi)
  - Land: 2,114.48 km^{2} (816.41 sq mi)

Population (2026)
  - Total: 40,006
  - Density: 18.920/km^{2} (49.003/sq mi)
- ISO 3166 code: LV-016
- Website: www.bauska.lv

Bauska Municipality (Latvian: Bauskas novads) is a municipality in Zemgale, Latvia. The municipality was formed in 2009 by merging Brunava parish, Ceraukste parish, Code parish, Dāviņi parish, Gailīši parish, Īslīce parish, Mežotne parish, Vecsaule parish and Bauska town, the administrative centre being Bauska.

On 1 July 2021, Bauska Municipality was enlarged when Iecava Municipality, Rundāle Municipality and Vecumnieki Municipality ceased to exist and their territory was merged into Bauska Municipality. Since that date, Bauska Municipality consists of the following administrative units: Bauska town, Bārbele Parish, Brunava Parish, Ceraukste Parish, Code Parish, Dāviņi Parish, Gailīši Parish, Iecava Parish, Iecava town, Īslīce Parish, Kurmene Parish, Mežotne Parish, Rundāle Parish, Skaistkalne Parish, Stelpe Parish, Svitene Parish, Valle Parish, Vecsaule Parish, Vecumnieki Parish and Viesturi Parish.

Latvian law defines the entire territory of Bauska Municipality as a part of the Semigallia region. It borders Lithuania.

== Notable people ==
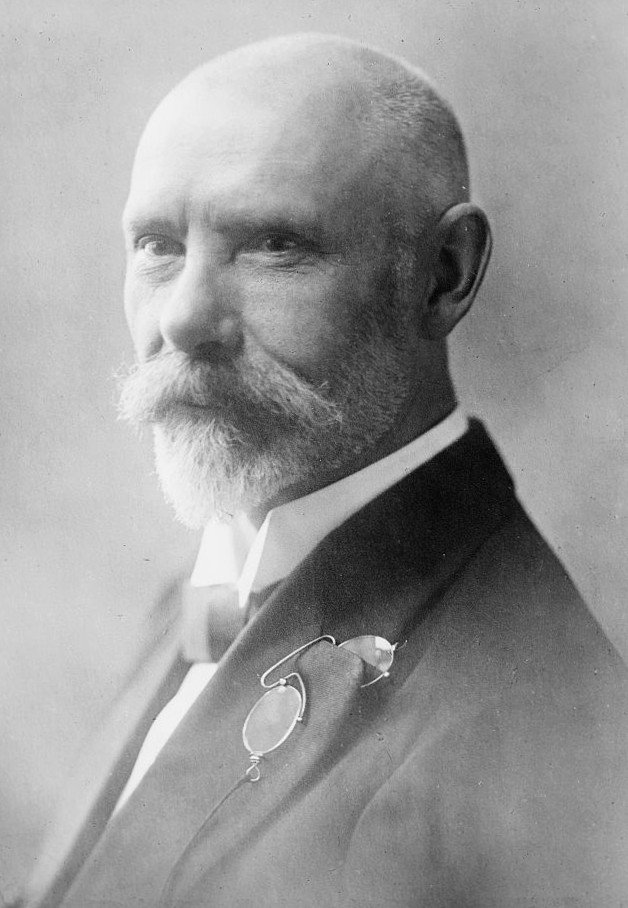
Janis Cakste, 1926

- Elisa von der Recke (1754 in Skaistkalne – 1833), a Baltic German writer, poet and memoirist
- Dorothea von Medem (1761 in Mežotne – 1821), a Baltic German Gräfin (Countess)
- Christoph Johann von Medem (1763 in Mežotne – 1838), a nobleman from Courland
- Dace Akmentiņa (1858 in Bauska county – 1936), a Latvian actress, one of the first Latvian theatre stars
- Jānis Čakste (1859 in Sesava Parish – 1927), politician and lawyer, the first President of Latvia (1922–1927)
- Frīdrihs Vesmanis (1875 in Rundāle Parish – 1941), lawyer and politician, the first Speaker of the Saeima.
- Berta Pīpiņa (1883 in Code Parish – 1942), teacher, journalist, politician and women's rights activist.
- Krišjānis Berķis (1884 in Bērzkrogs – 1942), a Latvian general.
- Arnolds Spekke (1887 in Vecumnieki Parish – 1972), historian, philologist and diplomat.
- Arvīds Pelše (1899 in Zālīte– 1983), a politician, functionary and historian.
- Žoržs Tikmers (born 1957 in Iecava), former rower and team silver medallist at the 1980 Summer Olympics.
- Jānis Ķipurs (born 1958 in Kurmene), bobsledder. team gold and bronze medallist at the 1988 Winter Olympics
- Atis Slakteris (born 1956 in Code parish), politician, Minister of Finance, 2007 to 2009.
- Ingmārs Līdaka (born 1966 in Vecumnieki), a Latvian zoologist and politician

== Twin towns—sister cities ==
Bauska is twinned with:

- Hedemora, Sweden
- (Georgia (country)) Khashuri, Georgia
- Náchod, Czech Republic
- Pakruojis, Lithuania
- Radviliškis, Lithuania
- Rypin, Poland
- Soroca, Moldova

== See also ==
- History of Bauska
- Administrative divisions of Latvia (2009)
