= Semigallia =

Historic region in Latvia

Semigallia Zemgale
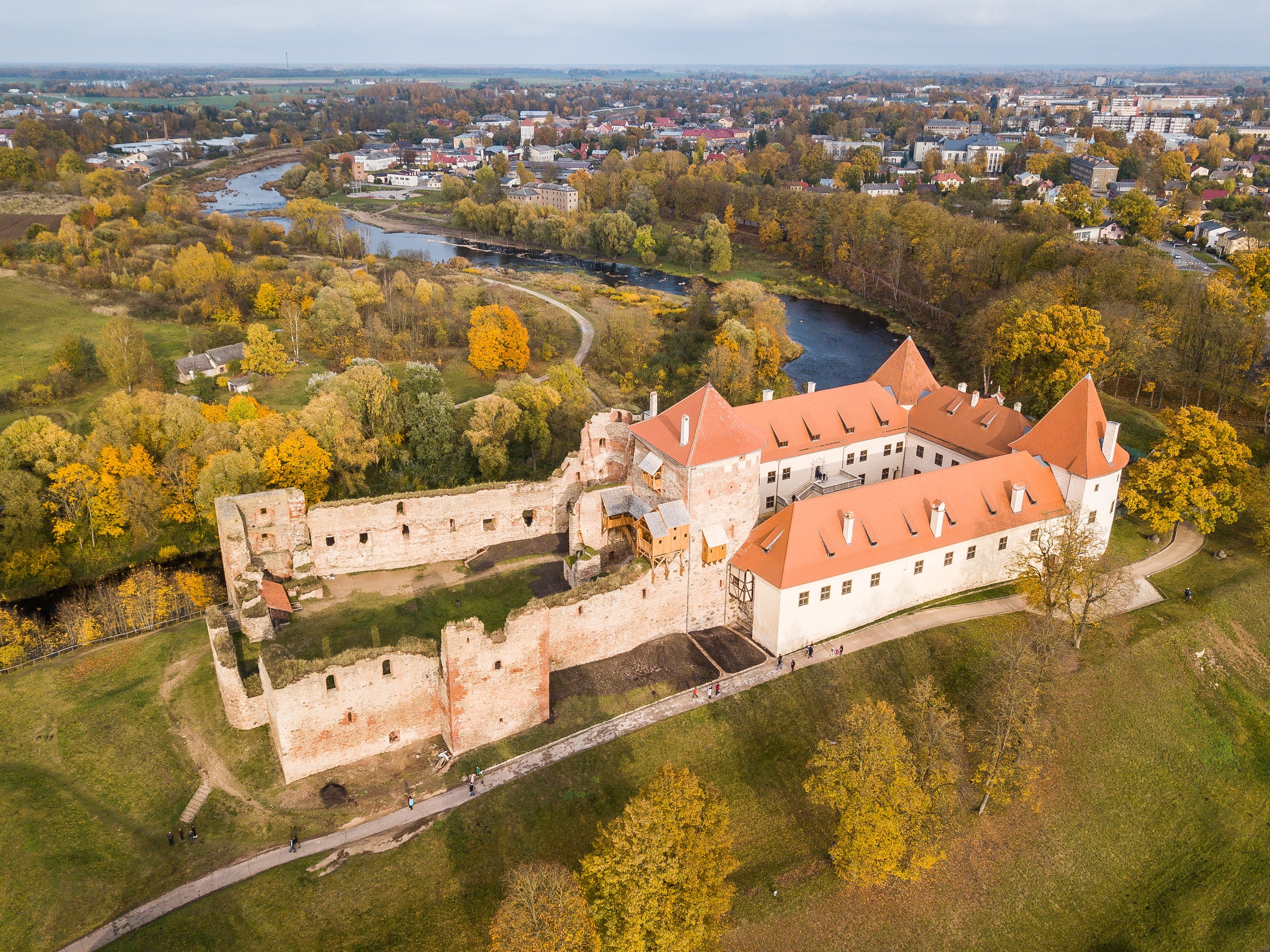
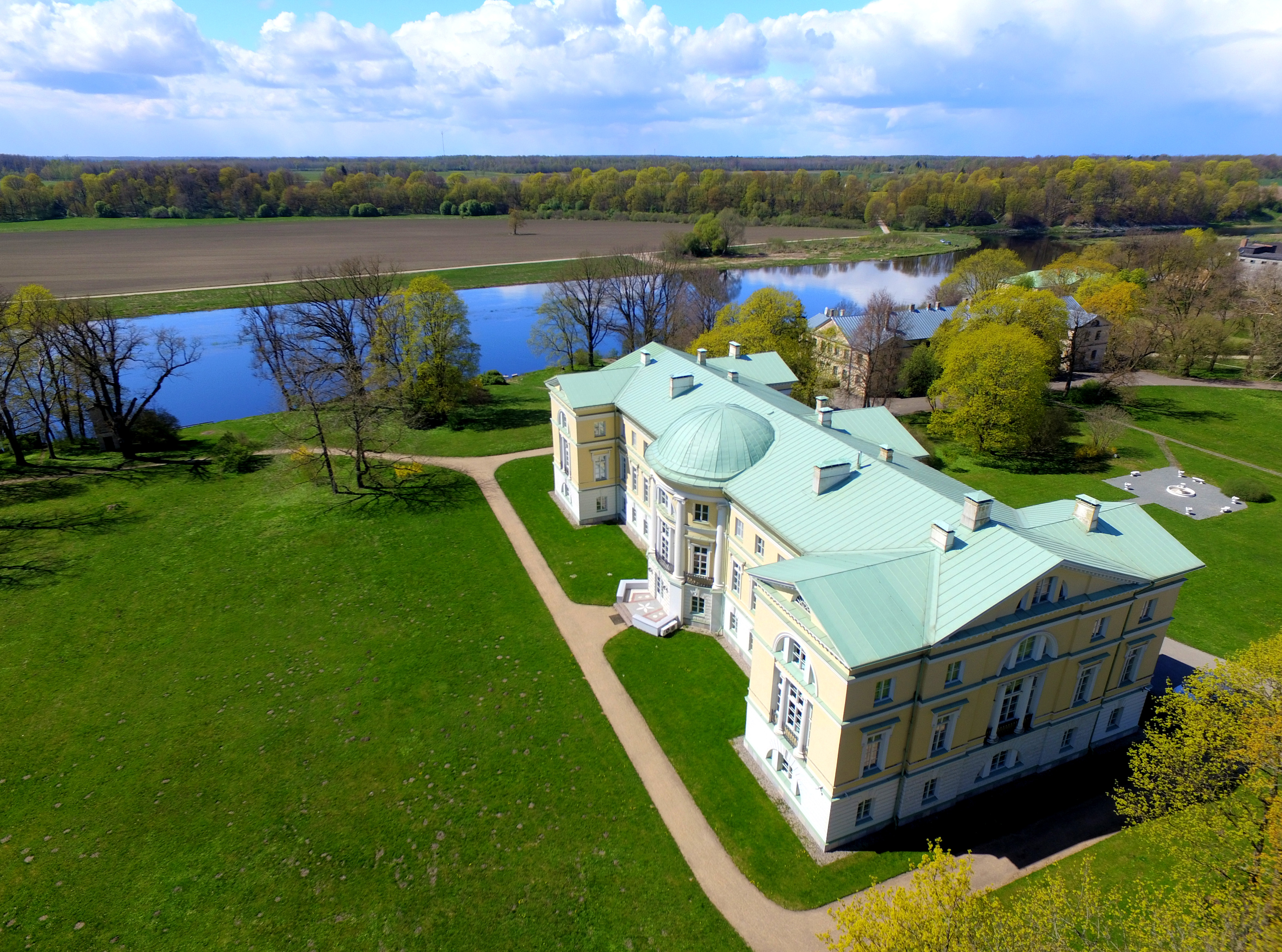
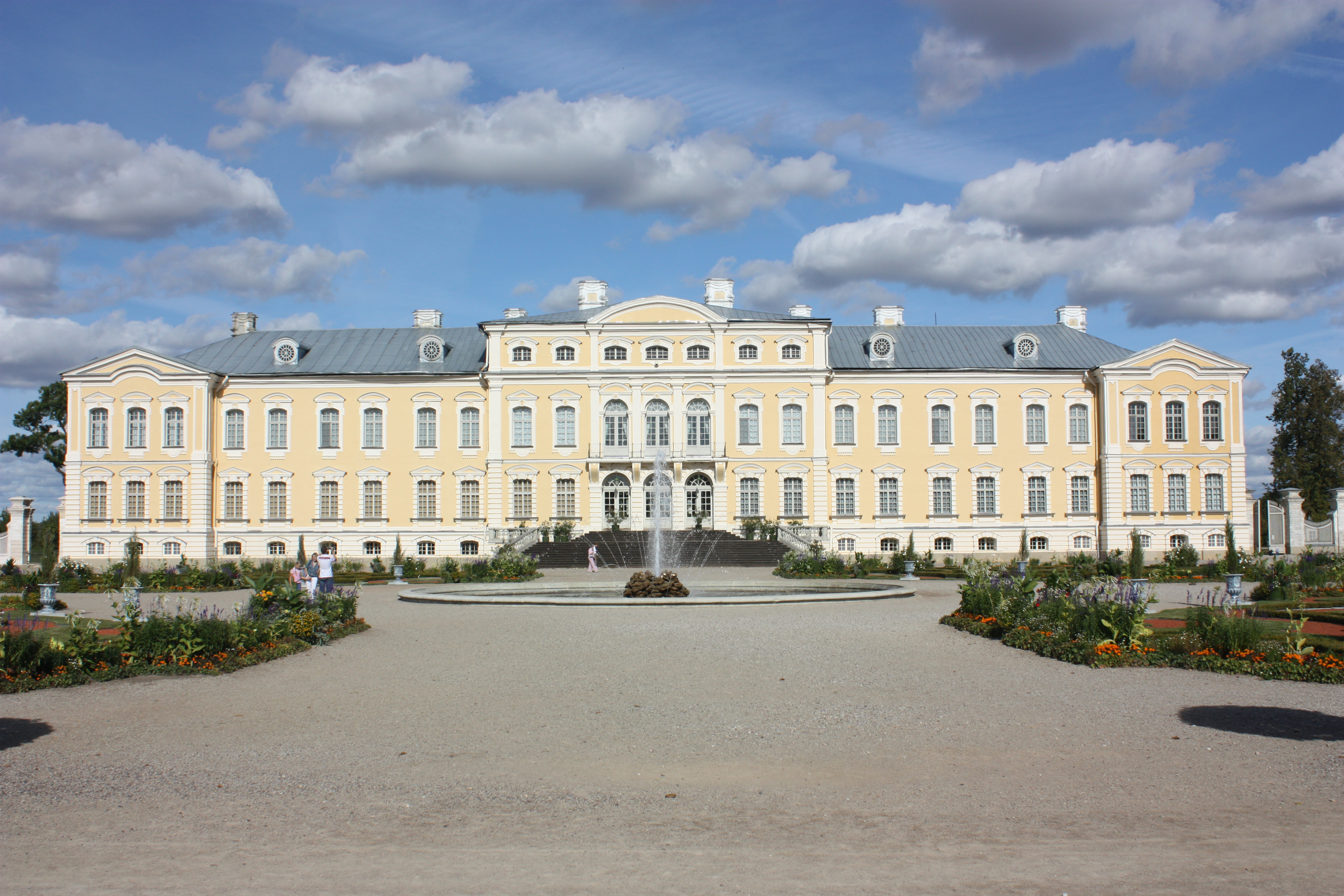
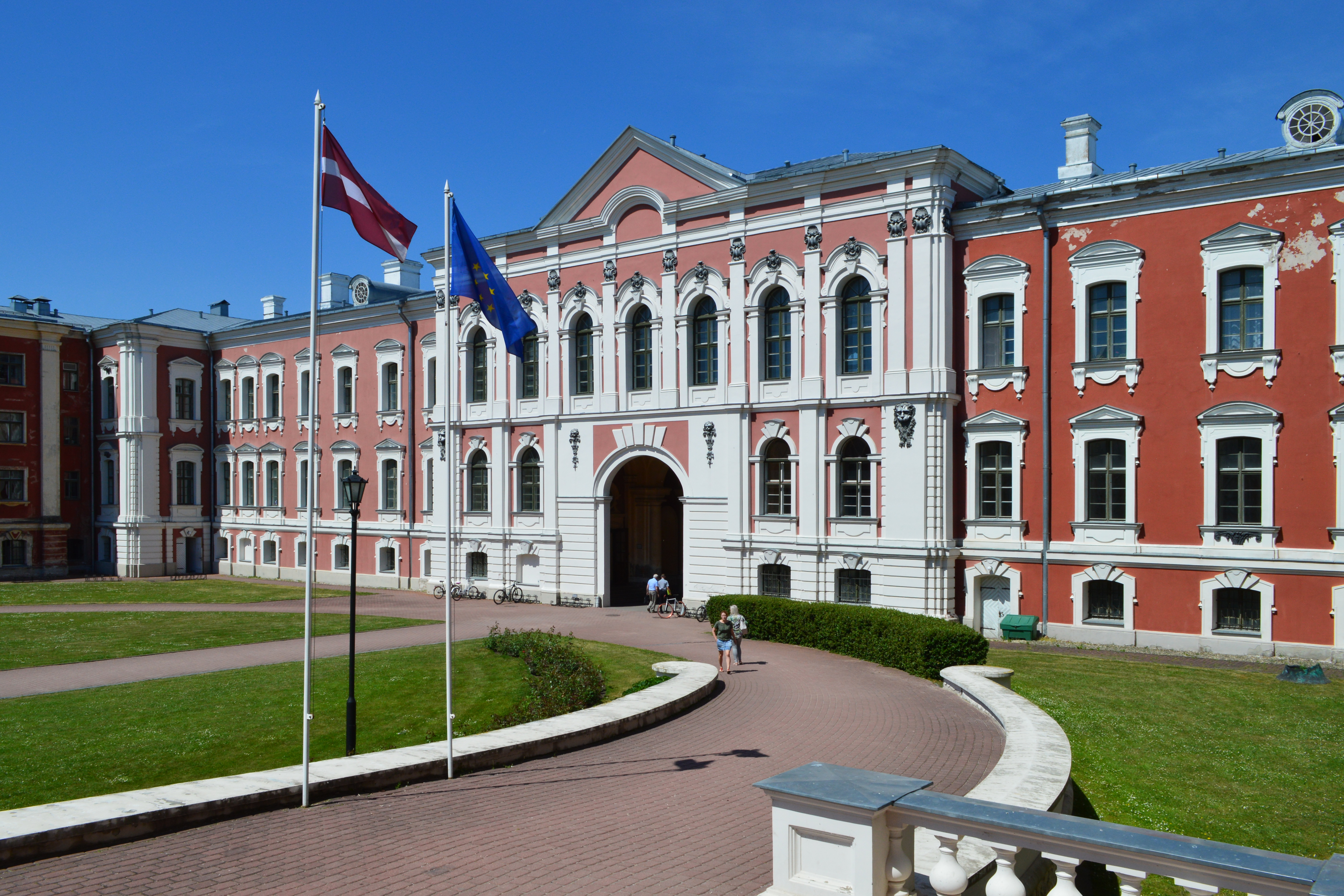
- From top, left to right: Bauska Castle; Mežotne Palace; Rundāle Palace; Jelgava Palace

- Flag Coat of arms

- Location of Semigallia in Latvia.
- Coordinates: 56°40′N 23°30′E
- Country: Latvia, Lithuania
- Largest city: Jelgava
- Time zone: UTC+2 (EET)
  - Summer (DST): UTC+3 (EEST)
- HDI (2017): 0.816 very high · 5th

Semigallia (Note: from Latin Semigallia; Latvian: Zemgale; German: Semgallen; French: Sémigalie; Lithuanian: Žiemgala; Polish: Semigalia; Livonian: Zemgāl; Samogitian: Žemgalė; Czech: Zemgalsko) is one of the Historical Latvian Lands located to the south of the Daugava and to the north of the Saule region of Samogitia. The territory is split between Latvia and Lithuania, previously inhabited by the Semigallian Baltic tribe. They are noted for their long resistance (1219–1290) against the German crusaders and Teutonic Knights during the Northern Crusades. Semigallians had close linguistic and cultural ties with Samogitians.

== Name ==
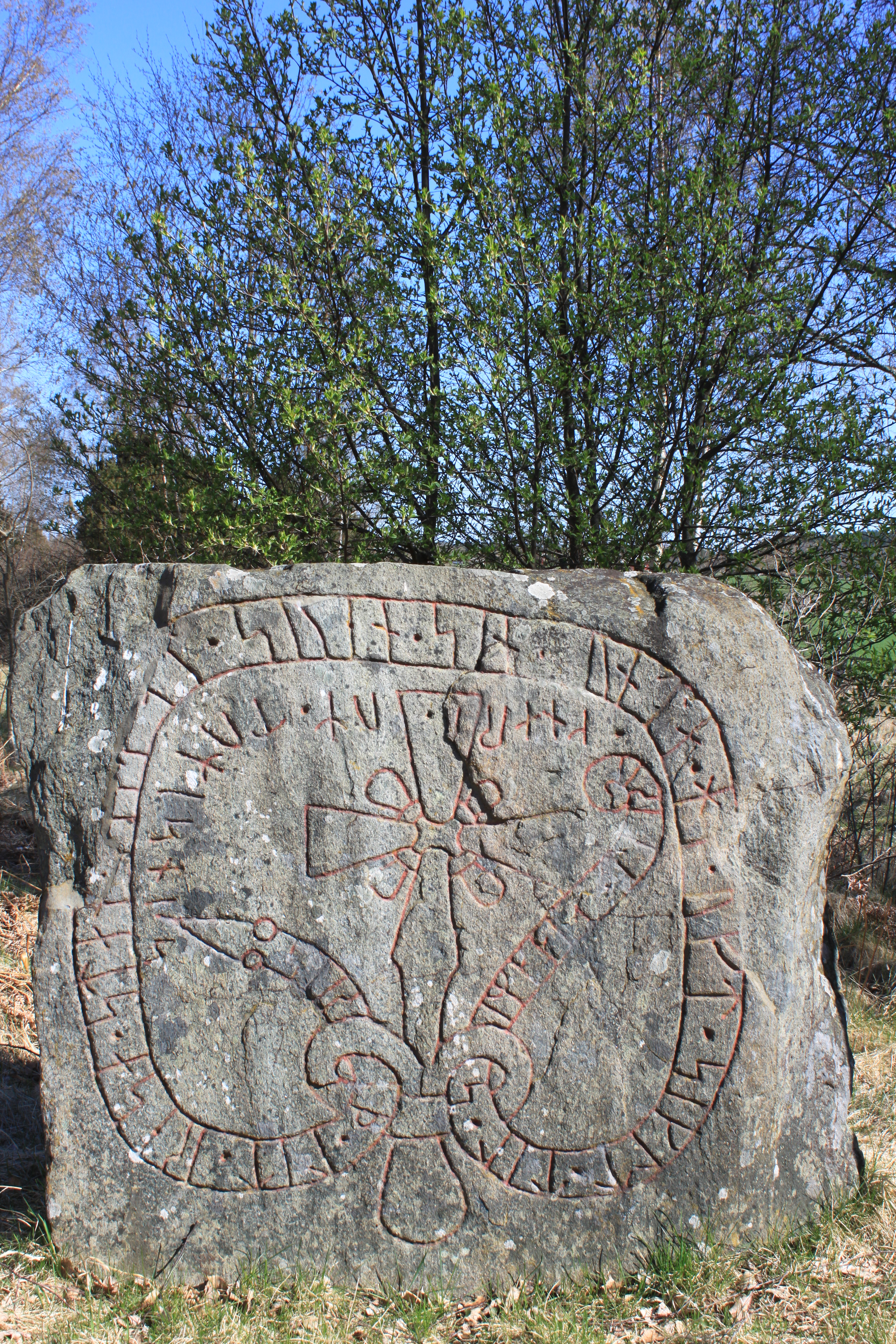
Mervala (Mervallastenen) runic stone in Sweden on which Semigallia (Simkala) is mentioned. Near lake Mälaren

The name of Semigallia appears in sources such as Seimgala, Zimgola and Sem[e]gallen. The -gal[l] element means 'border' or 'end', while the first syllable corresponds to ziem ('north'). Thus, the Semigallians were the "people of the northern borderlands" (i.e. the lower parts of the Mūša and Lielupe river valleys).

== Territory ==
=== 1st–4th centuries ===
Between the 1st and the 4th century the cultural area of Semigallian reached its maximum size. In the north, the territory spread the Gulf of Riga and included a more extensive area of the coast. In the west, the boundary was marked by the streams Ežerupis and Vadakstis. In the east, the territory crossed Dauguva and included part of its right bank. The southern boundary was marked by Mūša river. Semigallians, Samogitians, Selonians and Latgalians constituted one cultural area.

=== 5th–9th centuries ===
Between the 5th and 9th centuries, the territory occupied by Semigallians was reduced. They occupied a smaller area of the coast on the Gulf of Riga in the north and didn't reach the Daugava in the northeast.

In the 5th century, in the Lielupe river basin, a separate Semigallian tribe had formed. Their territory reached the Venta river in the west, the Baltic Sea in the north including the mouth of the river Lielupė, the Lėvuo and Mūša river basins in the East, and the northern borders of the Šiauliai and Panevėžys districts in present-day Lithuania in the south. They inhabited Žagarė, Pakruojis, Pasvalys, Linkuva and Joniškis.

=== 9th–13th centuries ===
Baltic Tribes c 1200

Between the 9th and 13th centuries, Semigallian's territory reduced even more. Samogitians took lands in the southwest. Meanwhile, the former Semigallian territory in the east was principality of Koknese. The neighbouring tribes were the Livonians in the north, the Latgalians in the northeast, the Selonians in the east, the Aukštaitians in the south, the Samogitians in the southwest, and the Curonians in the west. The centre of western Semigallia was Tērvete, while the centre of eastern Semigallia was Mežotne, which was destroyed in 1220 by the Livonian Order. Six Semigallian lands were known in the first half of the 13th century: Dobene, Dobele, Silene, Spārnene, Tērvete, Upmale, Žagare.

=== 1561–1795 ===
Following the collapse of the Livonian Confederation, most of Semigallia belonged to the Duchy of Courland and Semigallia, a vassal duchy of the Polish–Lithuanian Commonwealth, until the Third Partition of Poland in 1795.

== Language ==
The Semigallian language belongs to the Eastern Baltic language group. It was spoken in the northern part of Lithuania and the southern regions of Latvia. It is believed to have been extinct by the 16th century. Part of the Semigallians assimilated into the Latvians, and another part into the Lithuanians.

== History ==
The name Semigallia was mentioned for the first time in Scandinavian sources. The Danish chronicle Annales Ryenses mentions that Danish Vikings conquered "the whole of Prussia, Semigallia and many other lands" around 870. The Yngvars saga, in the 11th century, mentions Semigallians (Seimgaler) as tribute payers to Sweden. The Mervala stone in Sweden contains runic inscriptions which read:

sirið · lit · ræisa · stæn · (þin)a · at · suæin · sinn · (b)unta · h(n) · uft · siklt · til · simkala · turu(m) · knæri · um · tumisnæs.

Which, in English, translates as:

Si(g)rid erected this stone for Swen, her husband; he often sailed to Semigallia (Simkala) on his precious ship, passing Dómisnes (Cape Kolka).

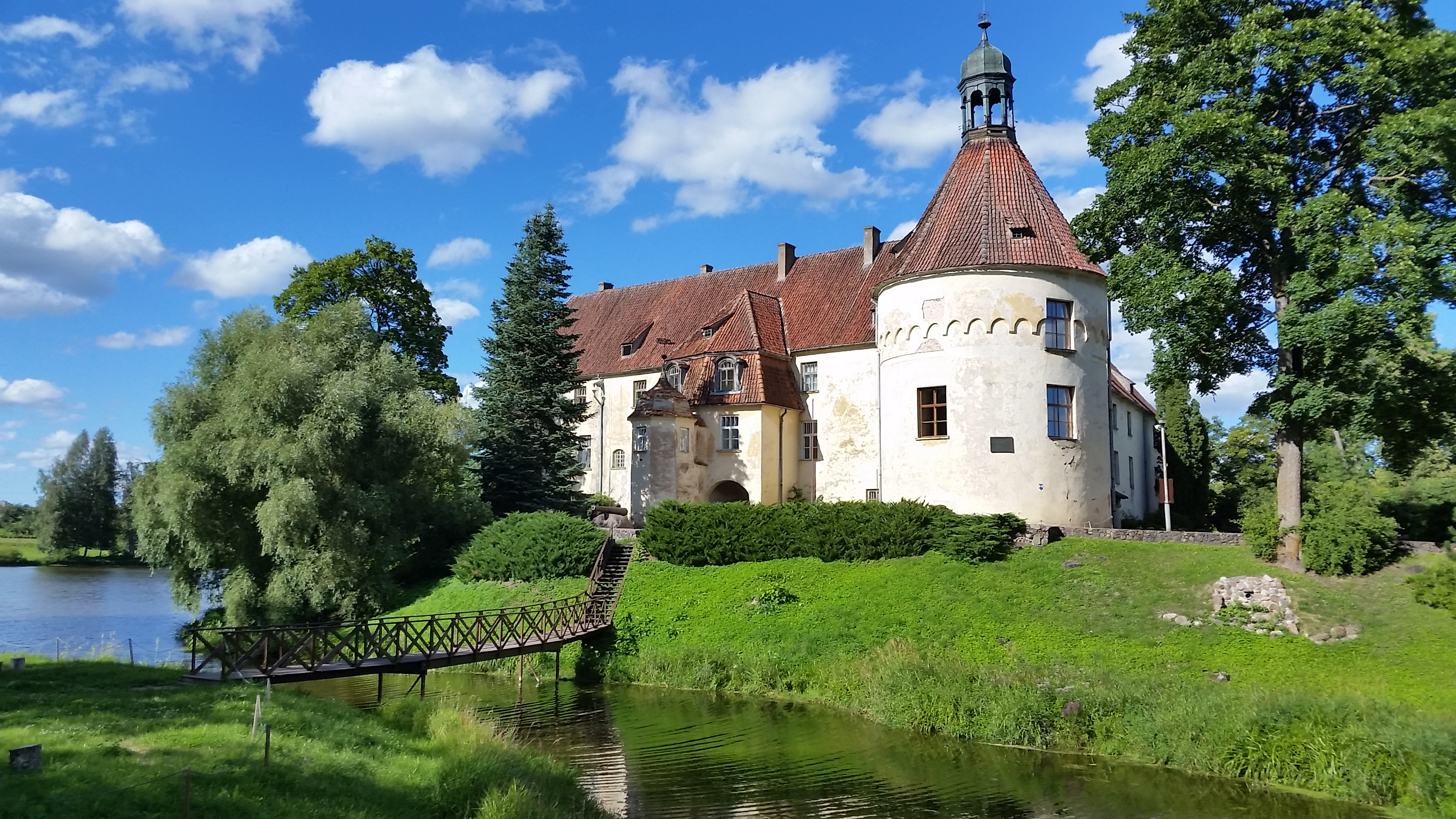
Jaunpils Castle

In the first half of the 13th century, settlements along the Daugava river were quite often attacked by the Lithuanians. The Livonian Order, which had begun conquering eastern Semigallia around the same period, made an alliance with the Semigallians and the Latgalians against the Lithuanians. In the winter of 1205, an army of Semigallians led by Viestards attacked the forces of Lithuanian Duke Žvelgaitis, who was returning from a war against Estonia with booty and Estonian slaves. His troops were caught unaware while crossing waist-high snowdrifts. Žvelgaitis was killed by a javelin thrown by the German Theodore Schilling. 1,200 Lithuanian knights perished; the Estonian slaves were slaughtered as well, in retribution for "past crimes" against the Livonians. In 1208, Viestards led a united Semigallian and crusader army into Lithuania but was defeated. In 1220, Mežotne, the centre of eastern Semigallia was destroyed by the Livonian Order. In 1236, Semigallians participated in the decisive Battle of Saule along with Lithuanians against the Livonian Order. In the same year, an uprising started in eastern Semigallia.

For the Livonian Order, Semigallia was a strategic territory. Lithuanians passed through Semigallia to raid settlements in Livonia, and they took advantage of the winter ice pack in the Gulf of Riga to reach Oesel Island. Also, this territory kept the Livonian Branch of the Teutonic Order separated from the Prussian Branch.

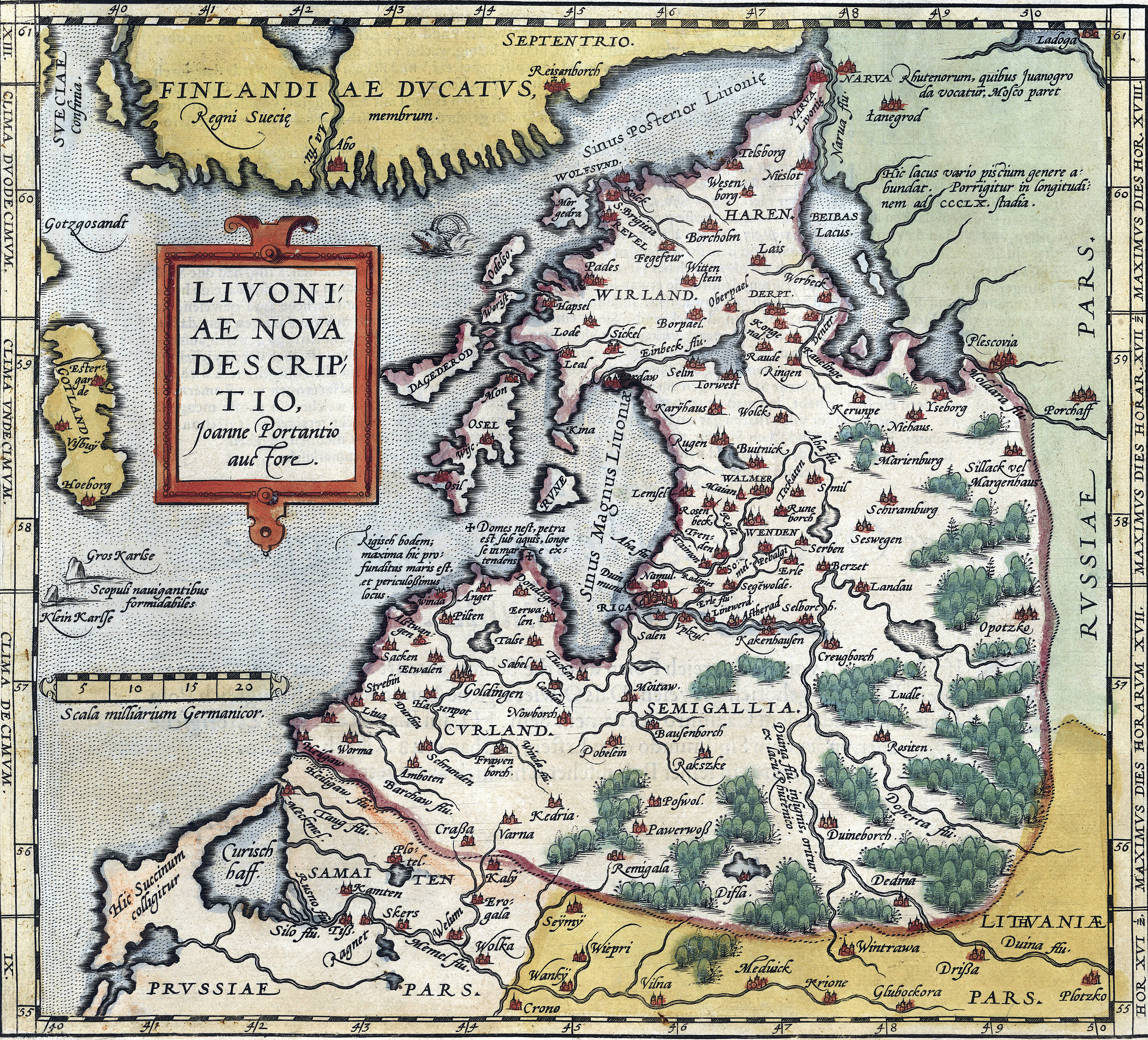
Map of Livonia featuring Semigallia in the 16th century

Castles played an important role in the strategy of the Livonian Order to expand into the Semigallian territory. They followed the line of rivers and some of them were established on native fortification sites. In 1250, the whole of Semigallia was conquered by the Livonian Order. Four years later, they split this territory between themselves and the Bishopric of Riga. In 1258, the Semigallians rebelled and managed to temporarily liberate themselves. In 1265, the Livonian Order began construction of Jelgava castle (Mithow, Mytowe). In 1272, Semigallia finally succumbed to the Livonian Order.

In 1279, after the victory of the Lithuanians in the battle of Aizkraukle, the final Semigallian uprising started, led by Duke Nameisis. Nameisis acknowledged himself a vassal of Lithuanian Grand Duke Traidenis. In 1281, Nameisis, along with many of his compatriots, withdrew to Lithuania and, in the same year, took part in battles led by Traidenis against the Teutonic Order. In 1287, the Battle of Garoza was won by the Semigallians.

Semigallia remained split between the Livonian Order and Lithuania. Lithuanian Grand Duke Gediminas titled himself Duke of Semigallia (Gedeminne Dei gratia Letphanorum Ruthenorumque rex, princeps et dux Semigallie) in letters to the Pope.

The Semigallian language was spoken in the region until around the 16th century.

== Present ==
Northern part of the ancient Semigallia is located in Latvia, southern part of it - in Lithuania.

Within present day Latvia, Semigallia has the status of one of five historical and cultural regions of Latvia. The region takes its name from the Baltic people known as Semigallians. Since the 13th century, Selonia has been included as part of Semigallia, and comprises the eastern part of the current electoral district of Zemgale. It takes its name from the Selonian Baltic tribe. Traditional Selonia also includes a portion of northeastern Lithuania. On the coat of arms of Latvia, Semigallia is represented along with Courland (Kurzeme), due to the historical connection between the two regions. Semigallia borders other historical Baltic regions such as Vidzeme (the southern part of former Swedish Livonia) to the northeast, Lithuanian Samogitia to the south, Courland to the west and Selonia to the east as well as the Gulf of Riga to the north. The geography of Semigallia consists mostly of plains and some hills. The Lielupe is the most important river after the Daugava. The major town is Jelgava (German: Mitau), the former capital of the united Duchy of Courland and Semigallia.

The territory of the Semigallia region in Latvia is defined by law as follows: Jelgava city, Bauska Municipality, Dobele Municipality, Jelgava Municipality, part of Baldone Parish, Baldone city, Daugmale Parish, part of Ķekava Parish, part of Babīte Parish, Birzgale Parish, the part of Ķegums city on the left bank of the Daugava, Tome Parish, part of Olaine Parish, Jaunauce Parish, Ruba Parish, Vadakste Parish, Džūkste Parish, Jaunpils Parish, Lestene Parish and Slampe Parish.

In Lithuania, Semigallia (Žiemgala) is considered a historically and culturally Baltic region. Žiemgala is part of Aukštaitija; its main centres are Joniškis, Pakruojis, Žeimelis, Linkuva and Pasvalys. The museum of Semigallia opened in 1958 in Žeimelis.
