= Birzgale Parish =

Administrative unit in Latvia

- parish of Latvia
- Coat of arms

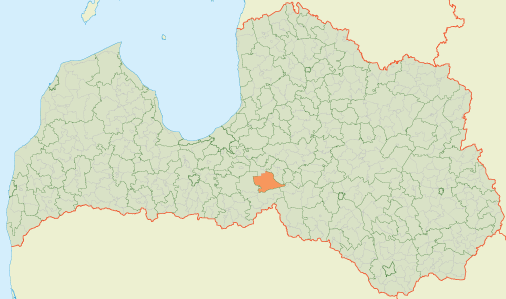
- 56°37′53″N 24°45′10″E
- Country: Latvia

Area
  - Total: 293.74 km^{2} (113.41 sq mi)
  - Land: 281.74 km^{2} (108.78 sq mi)
  - Water: 12 km^{2} (5 sq mi)

Population (1 January 2024)
  - Total: 1,508
  - Density: 5.1/km^{2} (13/sq mi)
- Website: www.birzgale.lv

Birzgale Parish (Latvian: Birzgales pagasts) is an administrative territorial entity of the Ogre Municipality, Latvia. The entire parish is on the left bank of the Daugava, in the region of Semigallia. The parish borders with Tome Parish, Vecumnieki Municipality Vecumnieki Parish and Valle Parish, Jaunjelgava Municipality Jaunjelgava, its rural territory and Sērene Parish, along Daugava with Skrīveri Municipality, Lielvārde Municipality Lielvārde city, its rural territory and Jumprava Parish.

== History ==
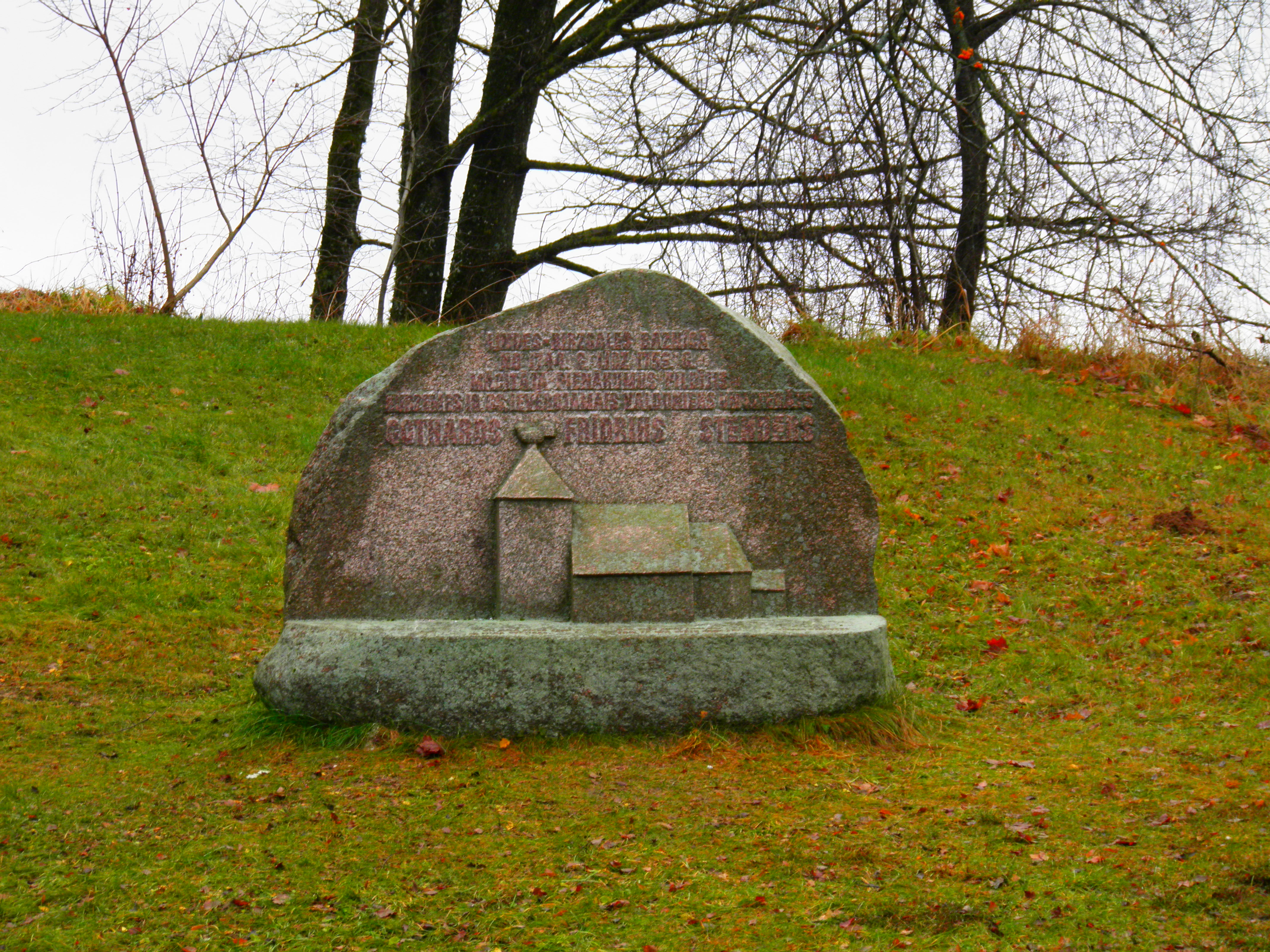
Monument G.F. Stender and the ruined Birzgale Church

In the Duchy of Courland and Semigallia in the 16th century Linde Manor belonged to Pletenberg family, in 1567 the Linde-Birzgale parish region was formed, which later belonged to Aizkraukle parish region. In 1752, the pastoral manor house Gotthard Friedrich Stenders burned down completely. The pastoral manor burned down for the second time in 1824, when the entire church archive was destroyed. In 1769, Linde's landlord designated four villages as the pastors of the pastor's manor, later the classrooms were leased, and in 1892 the house was sold to the landlords. The parish church was restored several times, in 1867 the church tower with stone foundations was built, in 1894 the sacristy destroyed by fire was restored and in 1896 part of the church was rebuilt. Even before abolition of serfdom in Livonia in 1816, the owner of Linde (Daugava) manor Sophia von Mengden published three law books for her people, namely, "Duties, Works and Hearings of Linde and Birzgale Parishes" (1796), "Soldiers 'or Recruits' Messli" (1805) and "Linde and Birzgale Farmer's or Parish Court" (1805). Linde (Daugava) manor with Birzgale half-manor was located in the territory of the parish, later Alstiķi manor ( Gut Halswigshof ), Kalna manor ( Berghof ), Kannenieki manor ( Gut Kanenneken ). During the land reform of 1920, Birzgale-Linde manor and pastor's manor were divided into 178 units in a total area of 3,200 hectares.

In 1935, the area of Birzgale Parish (until 1925 "Lindes Parish") was 207.5 km. In 1945, Birzgale, Daugaviešu, Degļupe and Oškalnes village council were established in the parish, but in 1949 the parish was liquidated. In 1954, the liquidated village of Oškalne was added to Birzgale village, but in 1956 the territory of Valles village kolkhoz "Jaunā gvarde" was added. In 1974, part of the territory of Birzgale village was added to Daugavieši village. In 1977, the territories were exchanged with Vecumnieki Municipality. The territory of the liquidated Daugavieši village was added in 1979. In 1990, the village was reorganized into a parish. In 2009, Birzgale parish was included in Ķegums Municipality.

== Towns, villages and settlements of Birzgale Parish ==
- Birzgalē
- Daugavieši (Birzgale Parish)

== Local attractions ==
- Lindes Park – a regularly planned park with an area of 7.4 ha with plantations of alien tree species century on several terraces of the Daugava valley. Can be seen in Linde Park dated 1767. The baroque gate of Linde manor, built in the Baroque style, which is the only surviving building of the manor complex.
- Noble von Hahn's family cemetery, which is formed by a stone fence closed in the form of a large circle. In the center of the burial ground is a huge granite cross, around which radially in the outer fold are formed the crucifixes of German soldiers who fell during World War I, underlining the importance of this place of worship. To mark the burial sites, Paul von Han's descendants moved a memorial plaque to the cemetery.
- Monument G. F. Stender and the ruined Birzgale church – a memorial stone created by the sculptor O. Feldbergs was unveiled in 1989. per year for the donations of the parish residents.
- "Rūķi" – Birzgale district museum has been established in Parka street 2.
- Monuments Andrejs Pumpurs native house "Keirāni" – the formation of the ensemble of monuments of the sculptor J.Karlov was started in 1988. The dominant feature of the ensemble is the stone "Austra tree" was completed in 1990.
- Memorial sign "Dīriķupīte" – a memorial sign created by sculptor V. Titans was installed in 1990 in the place where Andrejs Pumpurs spent his childhood years.
- Memorial sign "Robežkrogs" – the monument of the sculptor V. Titans donated by the Latvian Culture Foundation in 1990 marks the former border between Linde Manor and Mazjumprava manor and the ancient Kurzeme and Vidzeme border. Legend has it that A. Pumpurs listened to the stories of Daugava rafts and highway pedestrians here.
- Cactus collection "Hops". By applying in advance, you can see the cactus collection of Velta and Raimonds Bergmanis with more than 500 varieties cacti. This collection of cacti is one of the largest in the Baltic countries. R. Bergmanis' paintings are also exhibited here.
- Slaidēni castle mound – a memorial to the sculptor V. Titans, donated by the Latvian Cultural Foundation, has been erected in the castle mound, which has been inhabited since the 1st millennium BC. The oaks planted by Professor Kristaps Rudzitis grow here.
- Alstiķe manor s ruins – manor from which only the ruins have survived to the present day, formed during the restoration of the war-torn Jaunjelgava. In the middle of the 19th century, the manor belonged to the French nobleman Dubralis, but from 1875. of the Barons Nolkens. At the turn of the 19th century, the manor housed a psychiatric sanatorium "Sanatorium Halswigshof", which was destroyed during World War I.
- Wildlife Zoo "Saulītes" – on the flat slope of the left bank of the Daugava there is a wildlife zoo enclosed by paddocks, which can be seen from the Ķegums – Jaunjelgava highway and where about two dozen deer and several wild boars are raised. By prior arrangement with the owners, it is possible to visit the garden with a story about wildlife breeding.
- Duke Jacob Kettler hunting castle ruins. 17th century Duke Jacob established a hunting manor here. It is believed that the duke sent slender mast pines to Kurzeme from here to build his ships. Until the First World War, the manor was managed by landlords Vīndži. During the land reform of 1920s, the land was taken away from the landlords and distributed to the farmers. At present survived only about 350 years old engine house which was servicing manor. The place of the former castle is marked by a large coated chimney. The ruins are located close to Goba (station) at Birzgale – Valle highway.

== Gallery ==
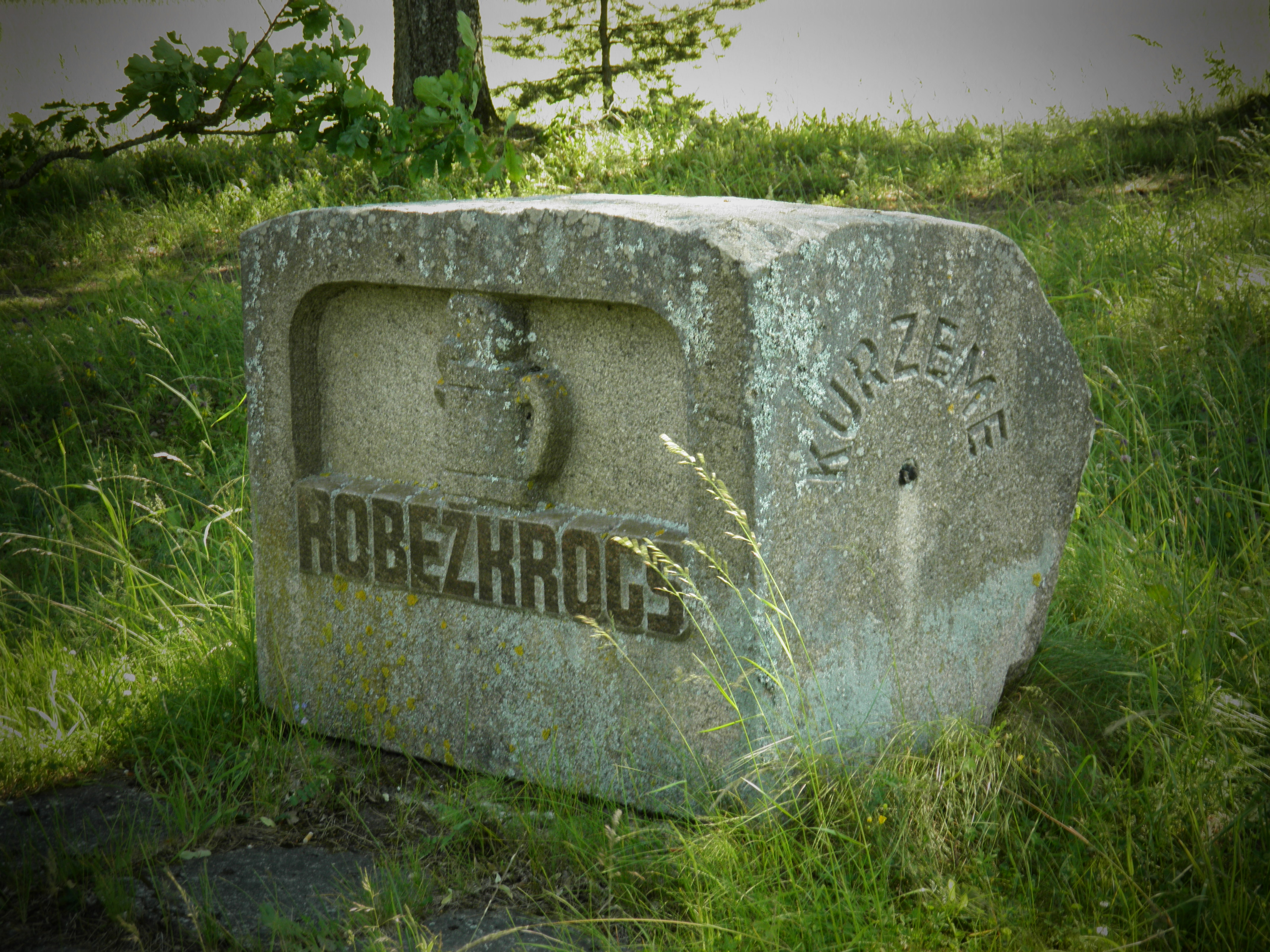
Memorial "Border Pub" ("Robežkrogs")

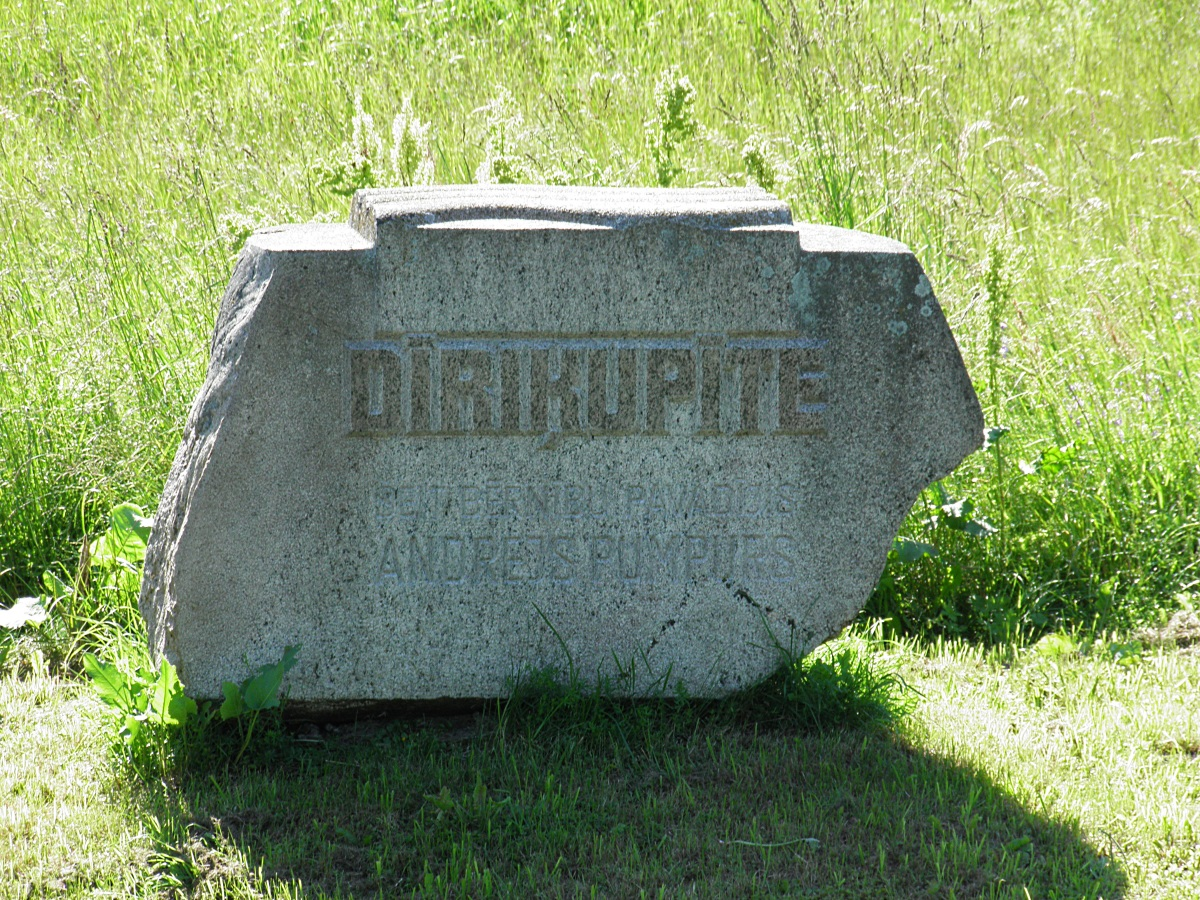
Memorial "Dürķupīte"

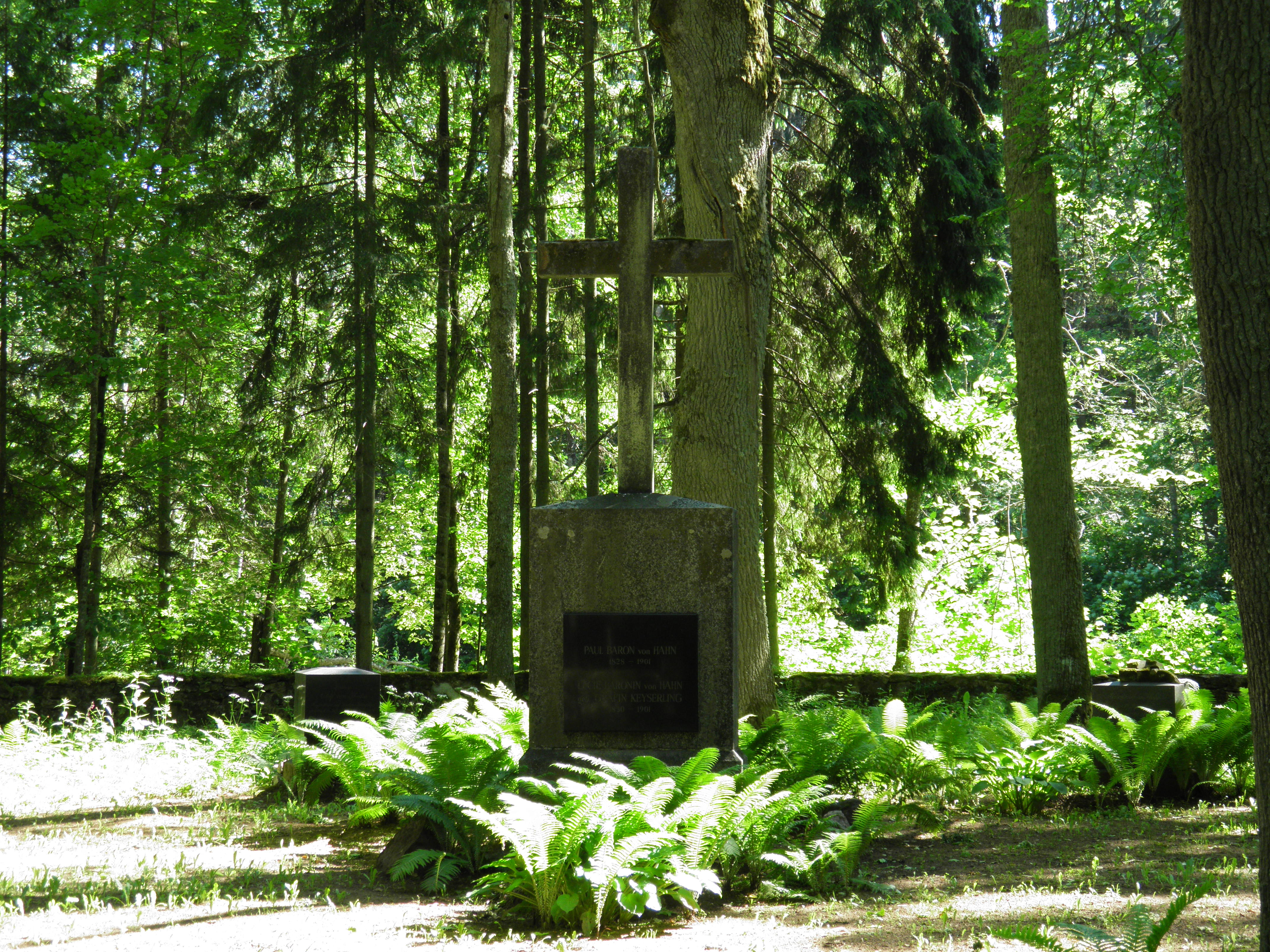
Barons von Hāni family cemetery

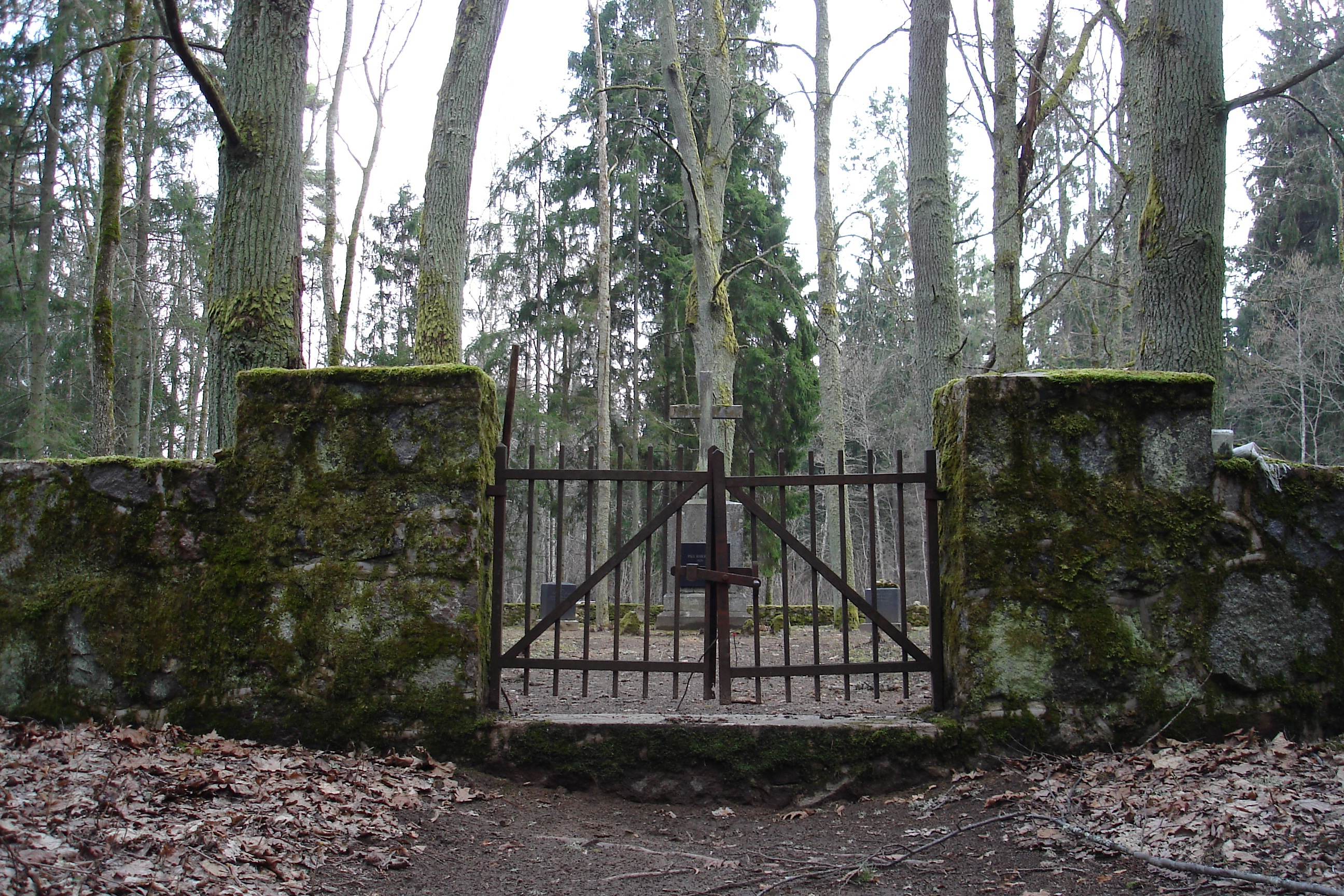
Barons von Hāni family cemetery

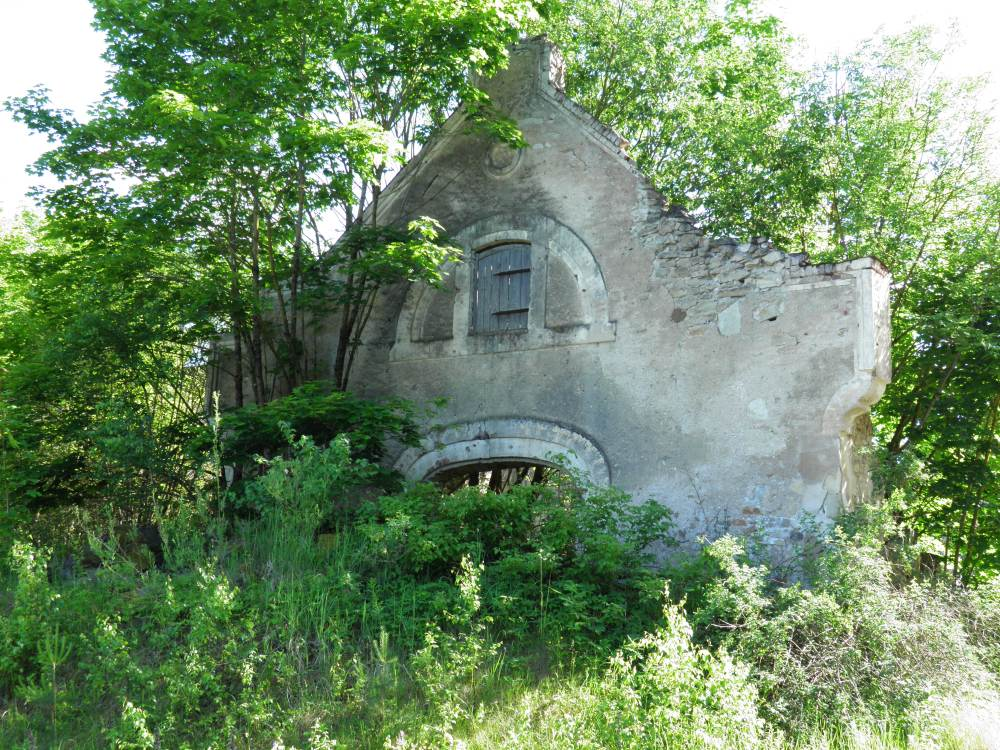
Alstiķes manor ruins

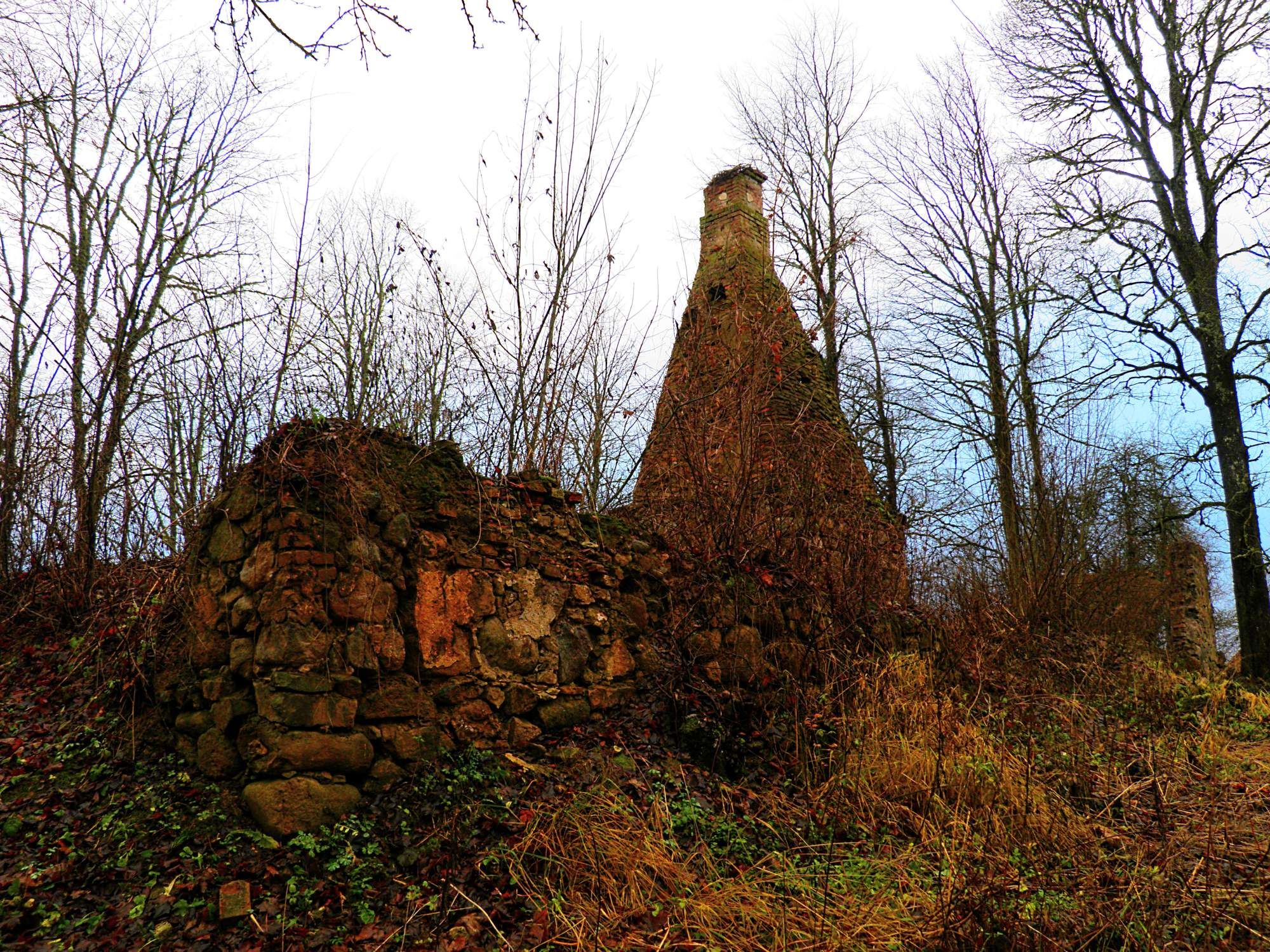
Duke Jacob's Hunting Castle Ruins

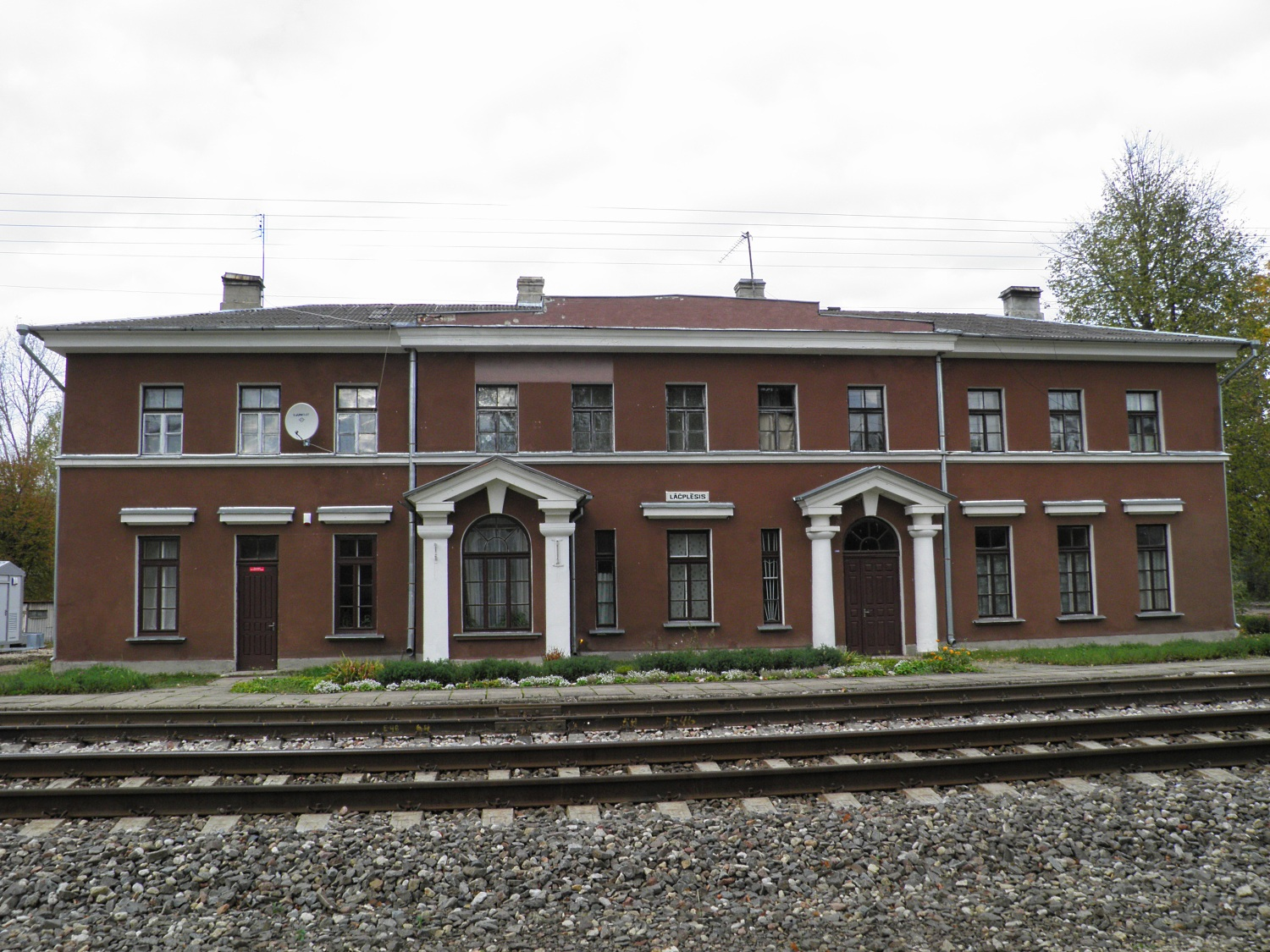
Lāčplēsis railway station building

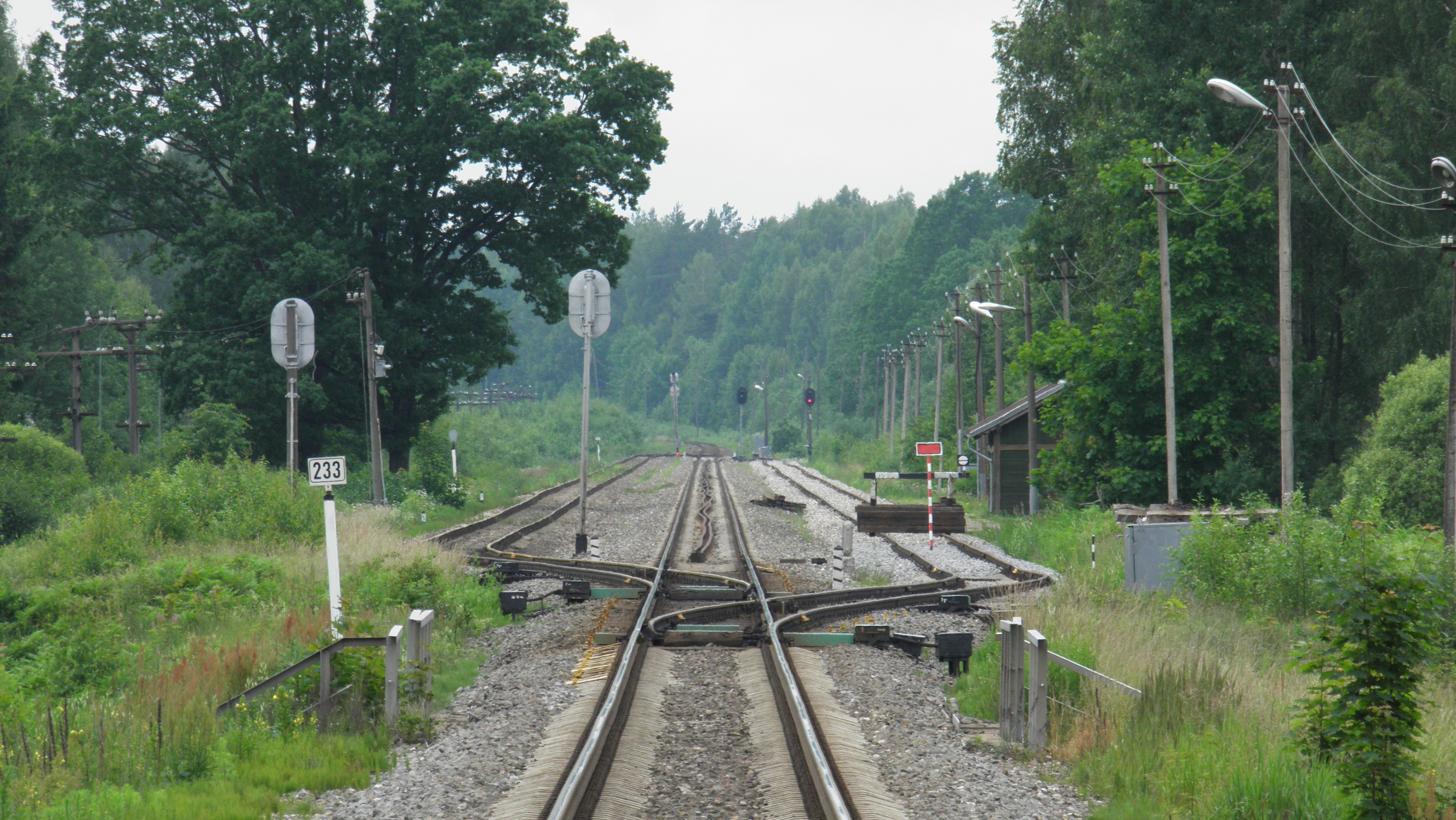
Lāčplēsis railway station

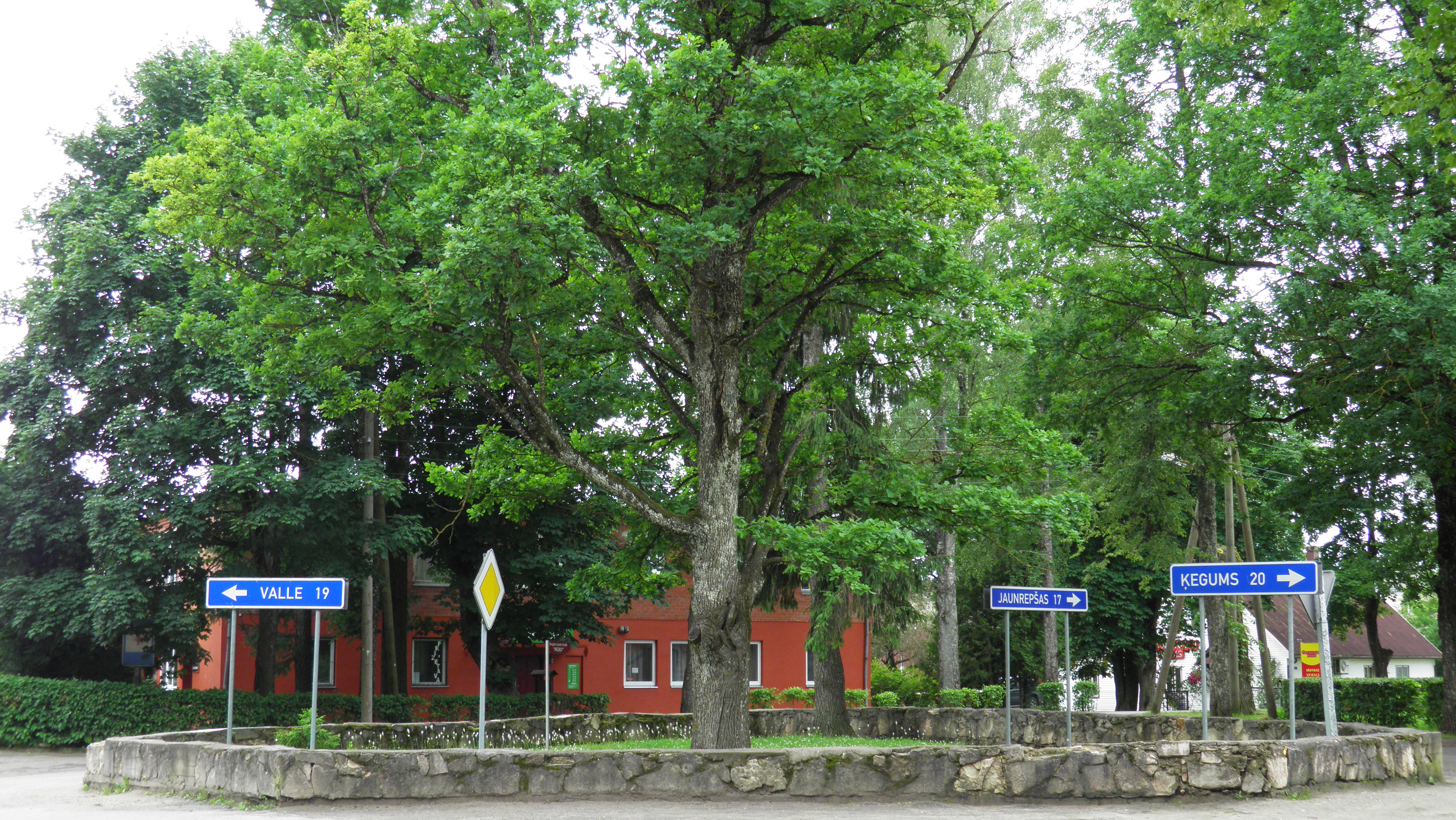
Birzgale

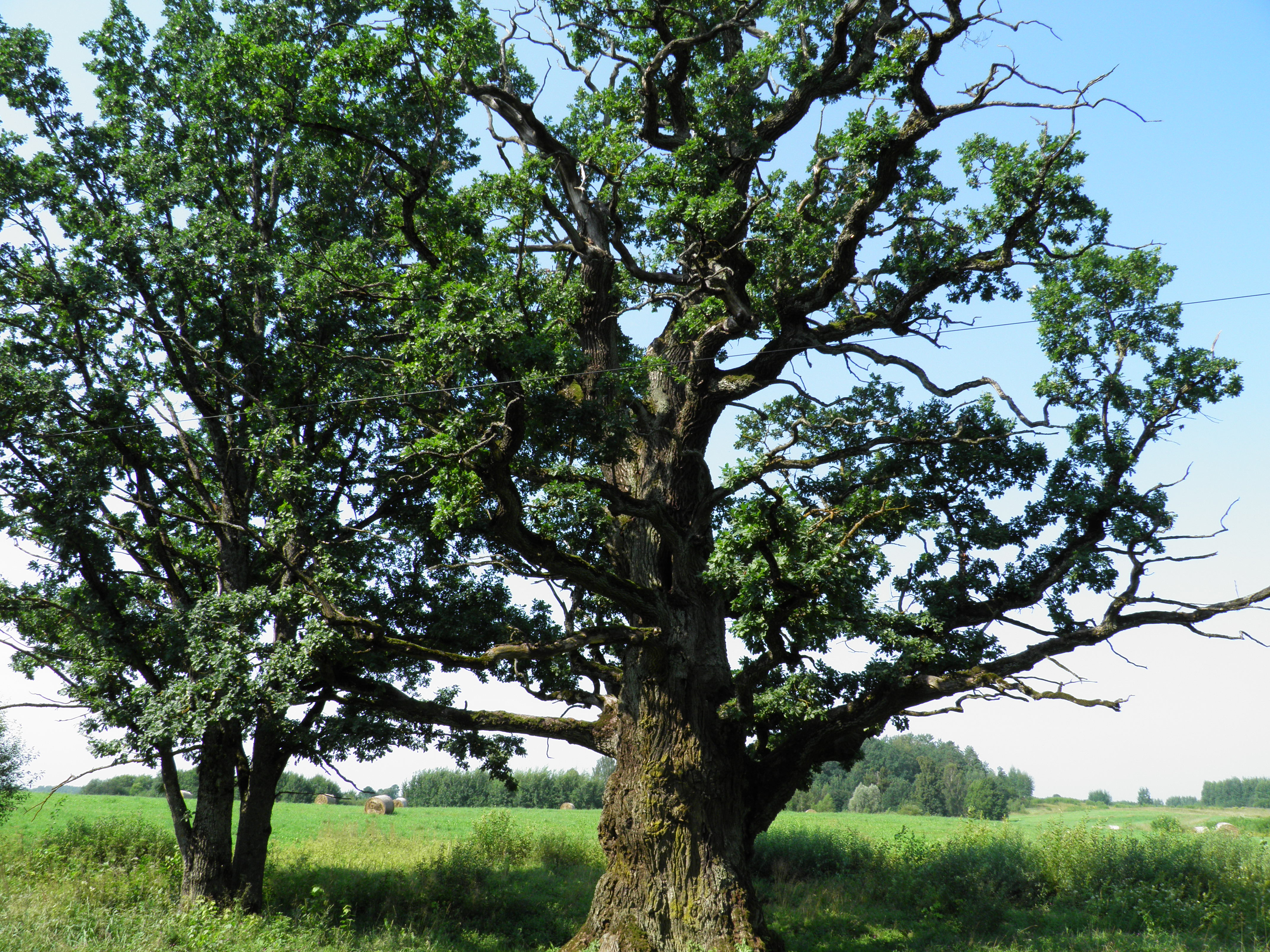
Gāguļu oak

Austras koks

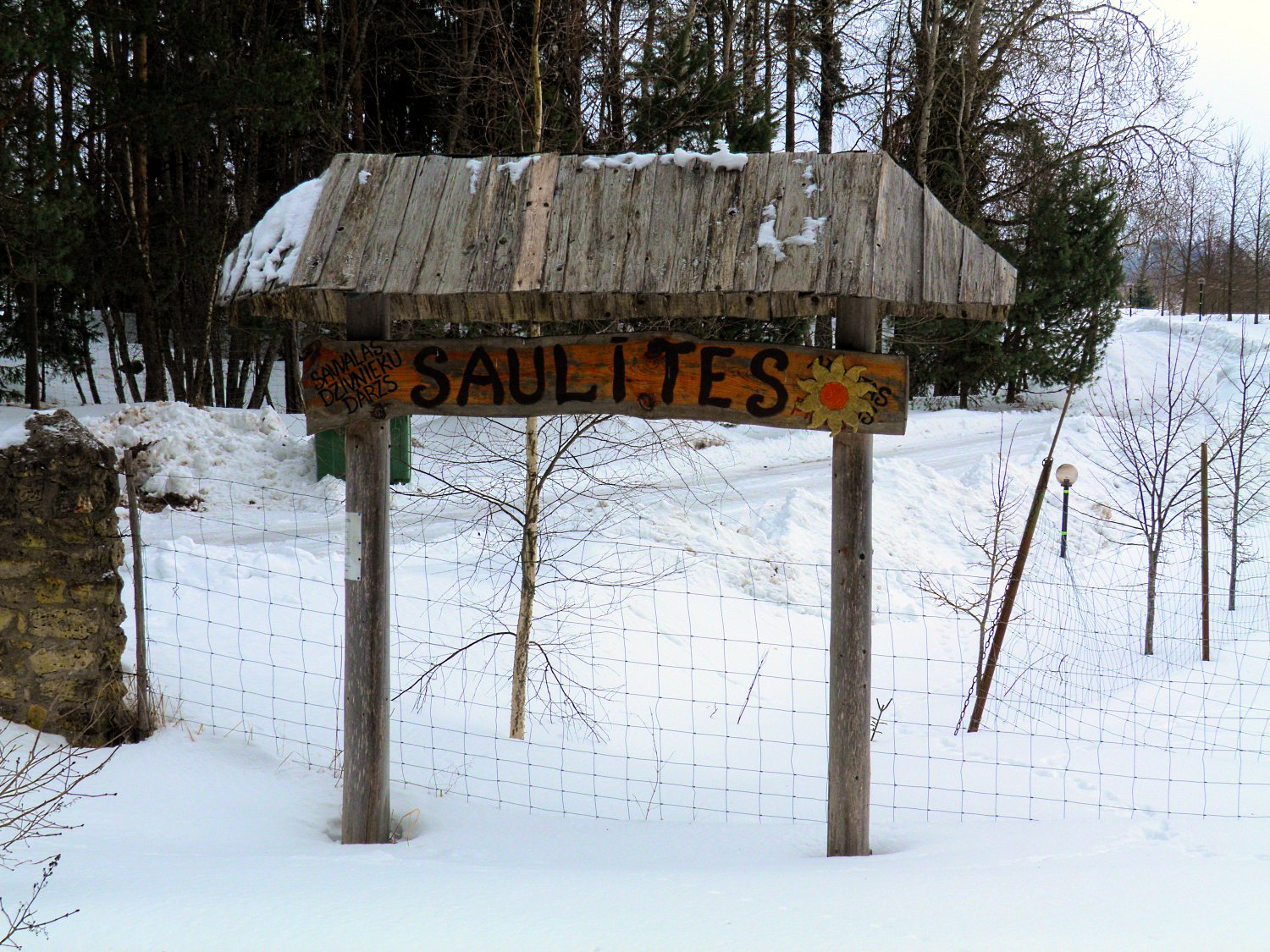
Gates of the wildlife zoo "Saulīte"
