= Vecumnieki Municipality =

Municipality of Latvia

Vecumnieki Municipality Vecumnieku novads
- Municipality
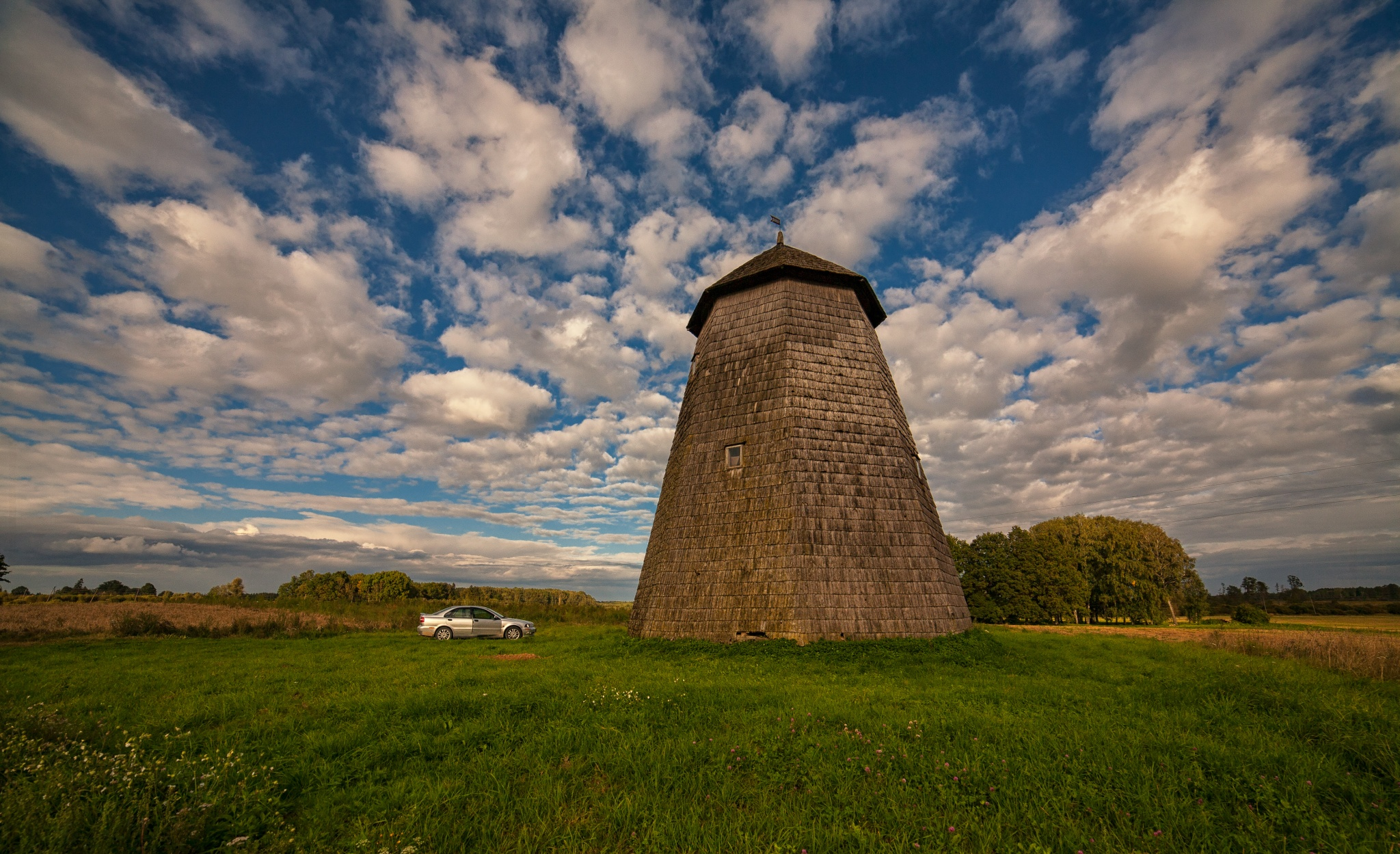
- Ķiru windmill

- Flag Coat of arms

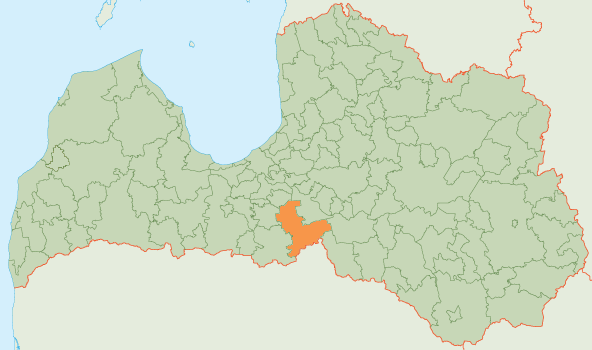
- Coordinates: 56°36′23″N 24°31′20″E
- Country: Latvia
- Formed: 2009
- Centre: Vecumnieki

Government
  - Council Chair: Guntis Kalniņš (LRA)

Area
  - Total: 844.83 km^{2} (326.19 sq mi)
  - Land: 827.53 km^{2} (319.51 sq mi)
  - Water: 17.3 km^{2} (6.7 sq mi)

Population (2021)
  - Total: 7,795
  - Density: 9.420/km^{2} (24.40/sq mi)
- Website: www.vecumnieki.lv

Vecumnieki Municipality (Latvian: Vecumnieku novads) is a former municipality in Semigallia, Latvia. The municipality was formed in 2009 by merging Bārbele parish, Kurmene parish, Skaistkalne parish, Stelpe parish, Valle parish and Vecumnieki parish; the administrative centre being Vecumnieki. The population in 2020 was 7,665.

On 1 July 2021, Vecumnieki Municipality ceased to exist and its territory was merged with Bauska Municipality.

== Population ==
Parish	Population (year)
Bārbele parish	788 (2018)
Kurmene parish	593 (2018)
Skaistkalne parish	1087 (2018)
Stelpe parish	802 (2018)
Valle parish	942 (2018)
Vecumnieki parish	4290 (2018)

== Culture ==
Since 2006 every year in July Vecumnieki county hosts a nation-wide Lily festival with exhibition of lilies, competition among florists and other cultural events and activities.

== Notable countrymen ==
- Jānis Lazdiņš (1875–1953), musician and diplomat. First violinist of the Court Orchestra of the Russian Empire (1902–1917), Ambassador of Latvia to Belgium and Luxembourg (from 1929)
- Alfreds Amtmanis-Briedītis (1885–1966), actor, director and performing arts teacher
- Arnolds Spekke (1887–1972), philologist, historian, diplomat
- Indulis Folkmanis (born 1939), sculptor
- Ingmārs Līdaka (born 1966), zoologist and politician

== See also ==
- Administrative divisions of Latvia (2009)
