= Skaistkalne Manor =

Manor house in Latvia

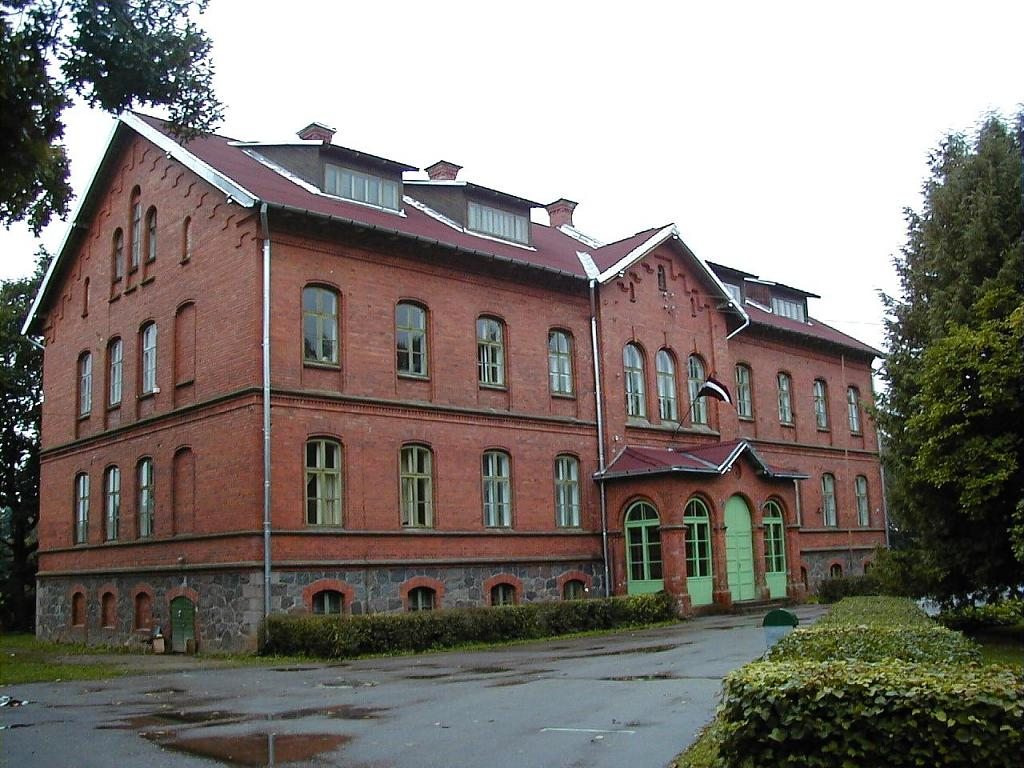

- Location within Latvia

General information
- Architectural style: Eclecticism
- Location: Skaistkalne, Latvia
- Coordinates: 56°22′51″N 24°38′46″E
- Construction started: 1893
- Completed: 1894

Design and construction
- Architect: Paul Max Bertschy

Skaistkalne Manor, also called Šēnberga Manor (Latvian: Skaistkalnes muiža, German: Gut Schönberg), is a manor house in the Skaistkalne Parish of Bauska Municipality in the Semigallia region of Latvia. It is located in the village of Skaistkalne near the Mēmele River on the border of Latvia and Lithuania.

== History ==
Skaistkalne economic center has historically been a manor. The manor complex still has a manor house, a barn, a magazine, a water mill on the banks of the Mēmele River and a stone bridge. The first owner of Skaistkalne Manor in 1489 was Heinrich Schoenberg, who was granted the estate by Freitag-Loringhofen, the master of the Livonian Order. The name of the manor originated from the first name of the owner and later became Latvian. Around 1650 the manor was bought by Johann von Berg-Carmel, who in 1658 initiated the construction of a Catholic church. In 1738 Skaistkalne manor was bought by Nikolaus von Korff, the owner of Priekule and Asīte manors and Brukna Manor, which is located about 20 kilometers from Skaistkalne. The manor remained in possession of the Korff family until the Latvian Agrarian Reform in 1920s. In 1754 future poetess Elisa von der Recke was born in Skaistkalne Manor.

The building was erected between 1893 and 1894, according to the project of Liepaja architect Max Paul Berchi. It was converted into a primary school in the 1920s, and now houses the Skaistkalne secondary school. A luxurious fireplace and fragments of decorative elements have survived.

== See also ==
- List of palaces and manor houses in Latvia
