= Linde Manor =

Manor house in Latvia

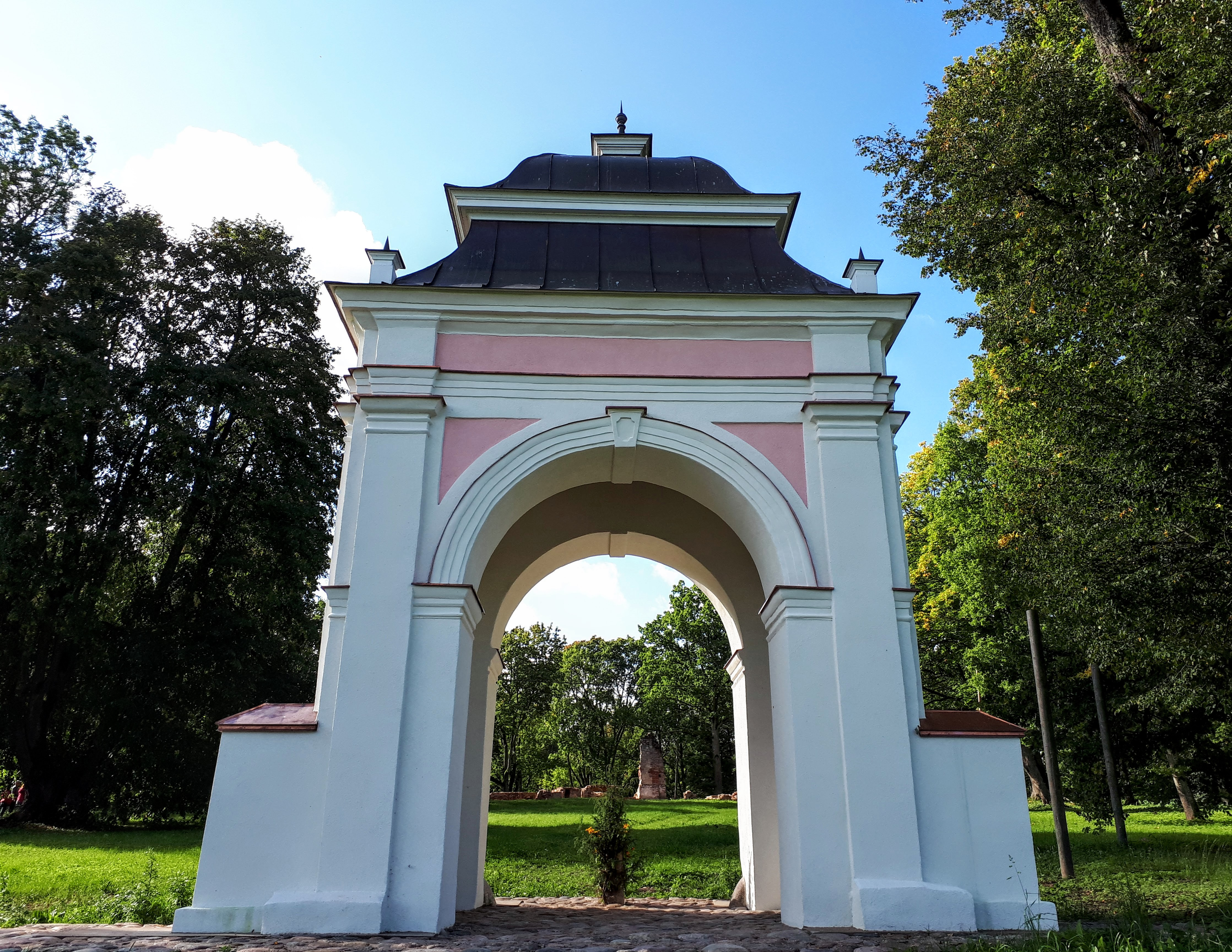
- Linde Manor Gates in Baroque style is the only surviving part of manor complex. After restoration in 2017.
- Interactive map of the Linde Manor area

General information
- Location: Linde, Birzgale Parish, Ogre Municipality, Latvia
- Coordinates: 56°41′54″N 24°51′01″E
- Demolished: WWI

Design and construction
- Architect: Johann Andreas Haberland

Linde Manor (German: Gut Linden) was a manor house in Linde, Birzgale Parish, Ogre Municipality in the Semigallia region of Latvia. It is situated on the left bank of the Daugava. It was destroyed during the First World War and never restored, only minor ruins remain. Detailed sketches of Linde Manor have been preserved. The 18th century Linde Manor Gates and Linde Manor Park are architectural monuments of national significance and have been preserved.

== History ==
Linde Manor is mentioned as early as the 13th century, when it belonged to the Linden family. In 1542 the manor was acquired by Johann von Plettenberg.

The gate of Linde manor was built in 1767. Linde Manor Park, which was designed and created in 1767–1772, is 7.4 hectares. It has Dutch linden plantations that have created special gazebos. The possible author of the garden project is Brethners, the home teacher of the daughter of the manor owner Georg Friedrich von Plettenberg.

After the death of Georg Friedrich von Plettenberg, who was the last male representative of the Plettenberg family of Kurzeme, the manor was inherited by his daughter, Sophia von Plettenberg (1760-1848), who married Johann Gotthard von Mengden in 1779. Sophia von Mengden was an educated woman, she wrote several important works - "Lindes and Birzgale Parish Duties and Hearings" (1796), "Linde and Birzgale Parish Court" (1805), as well as issued a release law for her Birzgale-Linde natives.

The author of the project of the Manor House was the mason Johann Andreas Haberland (father of Christoph Haberland), who came from Saxony and in 1749 became a citizen of the city of Riga.

In 1844 the manor was sold to the Governor of Courland Governorate Paul von Hahn. In 1866, the manor house was rebuilt and a second floor was built. The Hans owned the manor until the Latvian agrarian reforms of 1920s. The owner of the manor, Kārlis von Hāns, served in the 13th Tukums Infantry Regiment, which consisted of the Baltische Landeswehr soldiers, during the Latvian War of Independence, therefore, although the manor land was divided into 178 new farms, the manor center itself was left with the von Hahn family.

During the First World War the manor house was heavily bombed. It was not renovated and sold out as building materials. After the emigration of the Baltic Germans, the center of the manor became state property. In 2017, the renovation of the Linde Manor gate was completed.

== See also ==
- List of palaces and manor houses in Latvia
