= Brukna Manor =

Manor house in Latvia

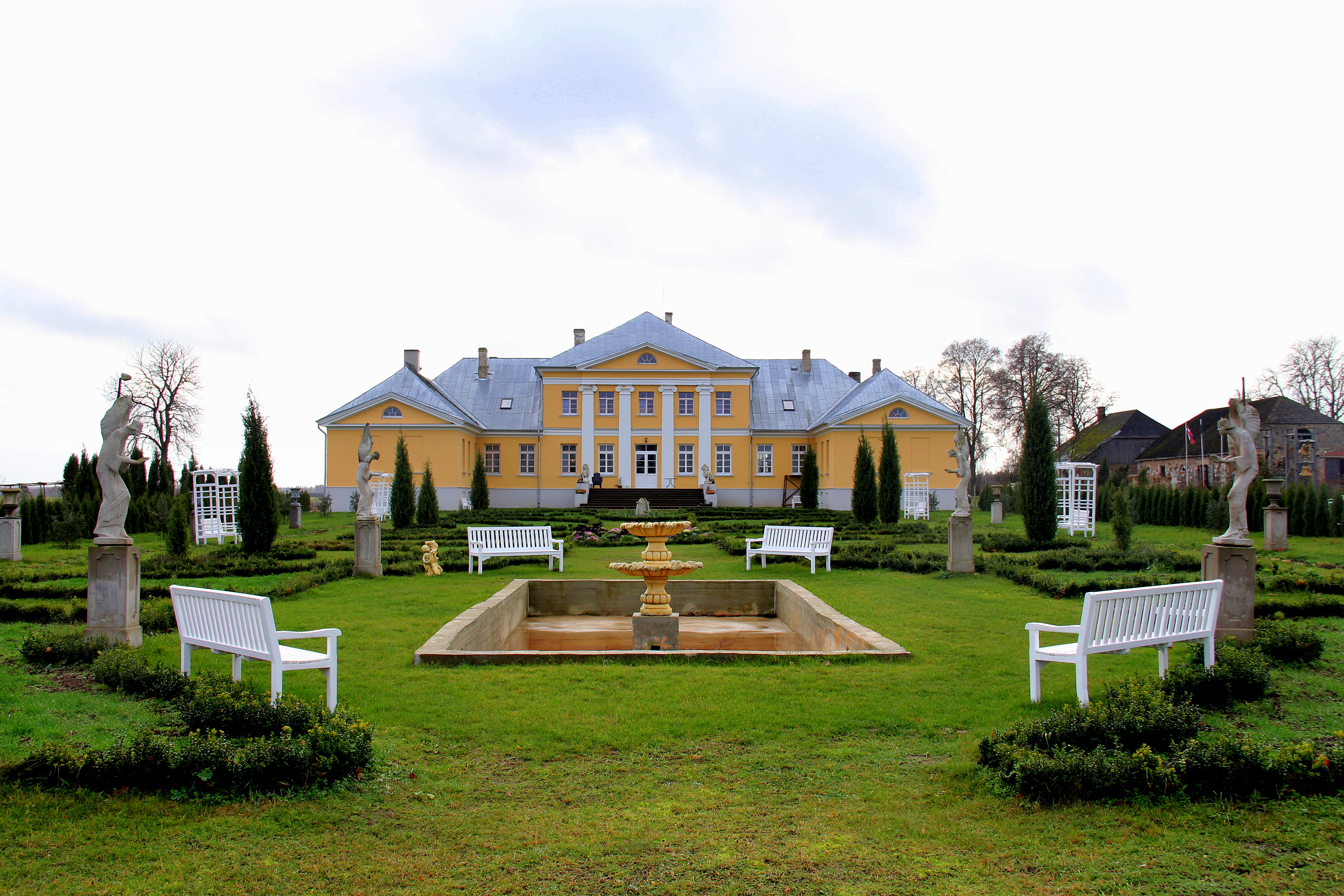
- Manor building from the garden.

- Location within Latvia

General information
- Architectural style: Classicism
- Location: Bauska municipality, Latvia
- Coordinates: 56.4686°N 24.4431°E
- Completed: Second part of 18th century.
- Client: von Korff family

Brukna Manor (Latvian: Bruknas muižas pils, German: Brucken) is a manor house in the Dāviņi parish of Bauska Municipality in the Semigallia region of Latvia.

== History ==
By 1920, the Korff noble family of German-Baltic aristocrats were the builders and owners of the Brukna Manor. In Zemgale and Kurzeme, they owned several manors, among them Skaistkalne Manor, located about 20 kilometers from Brukna. The Brukna Manor ensemble was built in the third quarter of the 18th century, but the present appearance of the manor is the result of the manor's reconstruction in a neoclassical style, which was done in the second quarter of the 19th century. After Latvia's agrarian reform of 1920, the manor house housed an elementary school. From 1927 to 1931 it underwent repairs. In 1966 the school was closed, and the manor house was converted into apartment building.

Since 2001, the manor has been run by a non-profit organization called the Mountain Blessing Community, based on ideas of Cenacolo. Instead of medications rehabilitation is achieved through prayer and occupational therapy.

In 2011, the Mountain Blessing Community carried out a project funded by the Mortgage and Land Bank entitled "Renovation of the Renaissance Garden at Brukna Manor" and a project by European Union European Agricultural Fund for Rural Development (EAFRD) "Simplified Renovation of Brukna Manor".

== See also ==
- List of palaces and manor houses in Latvia
