= Tome Parish =

Parish of Latvia

- parish of Latvia
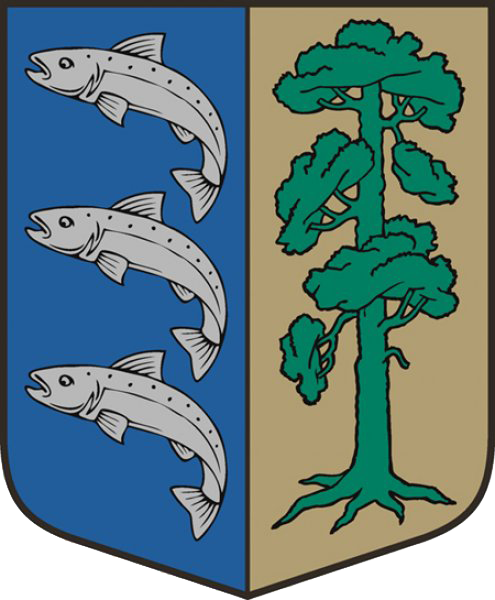
- Coat of arms

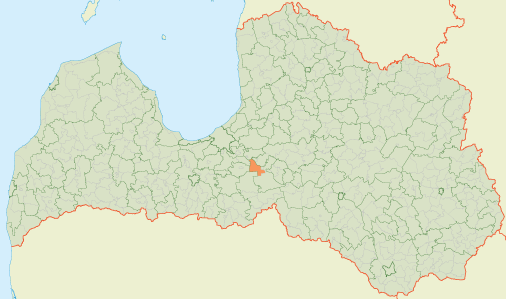
- 56°44′30″N 24°37′21″E
- Country: Latvia

Area
  - Total: 110.42 km^{2} (42.63 sq mi)
  - Land: 103.92 km^{2} (40.12 sq mi)
  - Water: 6.5 km^{2} (2.5 sq mi)

Population (1 January 2024)
  - Total: 670
  - Density: 6.1/km^{2} (16/sq mi)

Tome Parish (Latvian: Tomes pagasts) is an administrative unit of Ogre Municipality in the Semigallia region of Latvia (From 2009 until 2021, it was part of the former Ķegums Municipality).

== History ==
Tome's name "Thompus" was first mentioned in 1735. Until 1924, Tome Parish belonged to the Bauska, later to the Riga district. In 1935, Tome Parish had an area of 73 km^{2} and a population of 763 inhabitants. In 1945, Tome village council was established in the parish, which was abolished in 1947, but in 1949, with the abolition of the parish, it was re-established. Tome village belonged to Riga (1945-1949) and Ogres (1947-1949) districts and Baldone district (1949-1954). The village was abolished in 1954 and the territory was included in Strēlnieku village. In 1960, the Strēlnieku village was liquidated and the kolkhoz "Tome" territory was added to the Ķeguma workers' village, creating a "rural area of Ķegums". In 1993, Ķegums was granted city rights, but the rural territory was reorganized into "Tome Parish", which was liquidated again in 1994, adding Ķegums as a rural territory. In 2002, the city of Ķegums with a rural territory was reorganized into Ķegums Municipality. In 2010, the rural territory of Ķegums was reorganized into a separate administrative territory and renamed "Tomes Parish". The territory of Tome Parish is defined by law as a part of the region of Semigallia.

== Hydrography ==
Rivers:

- Brantupīte (Daugava tributary),
- Kausupīte,
- Līčupe (Daugava tributary),
- Silupīte (Kausupe tributary),
- Vilpīte.

== Towns, villages and settlements of Tome parish ==
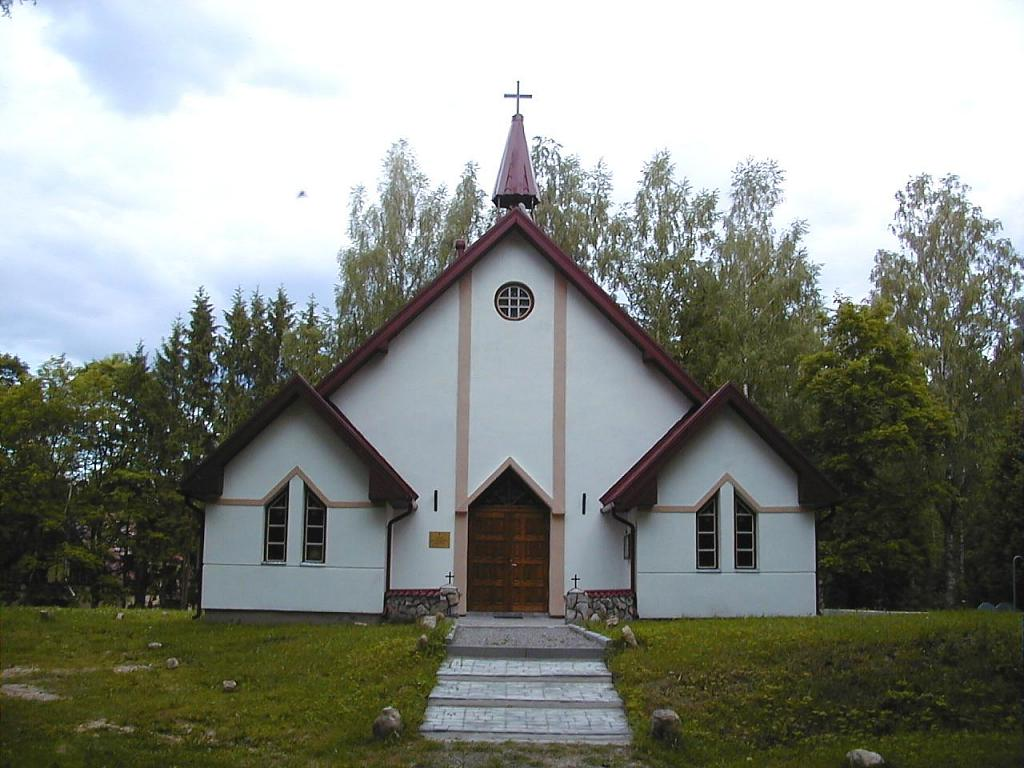
Lutheran church in Tome.

- Tome (Tome parish) (parish center),
- Rutki (Tome parish),
- Arāji,
- Bekuciems,
- Latgaļi (Tome parish),
- Tomes fish farm.
