= Vecumnieki =

Village in Latvia

- village
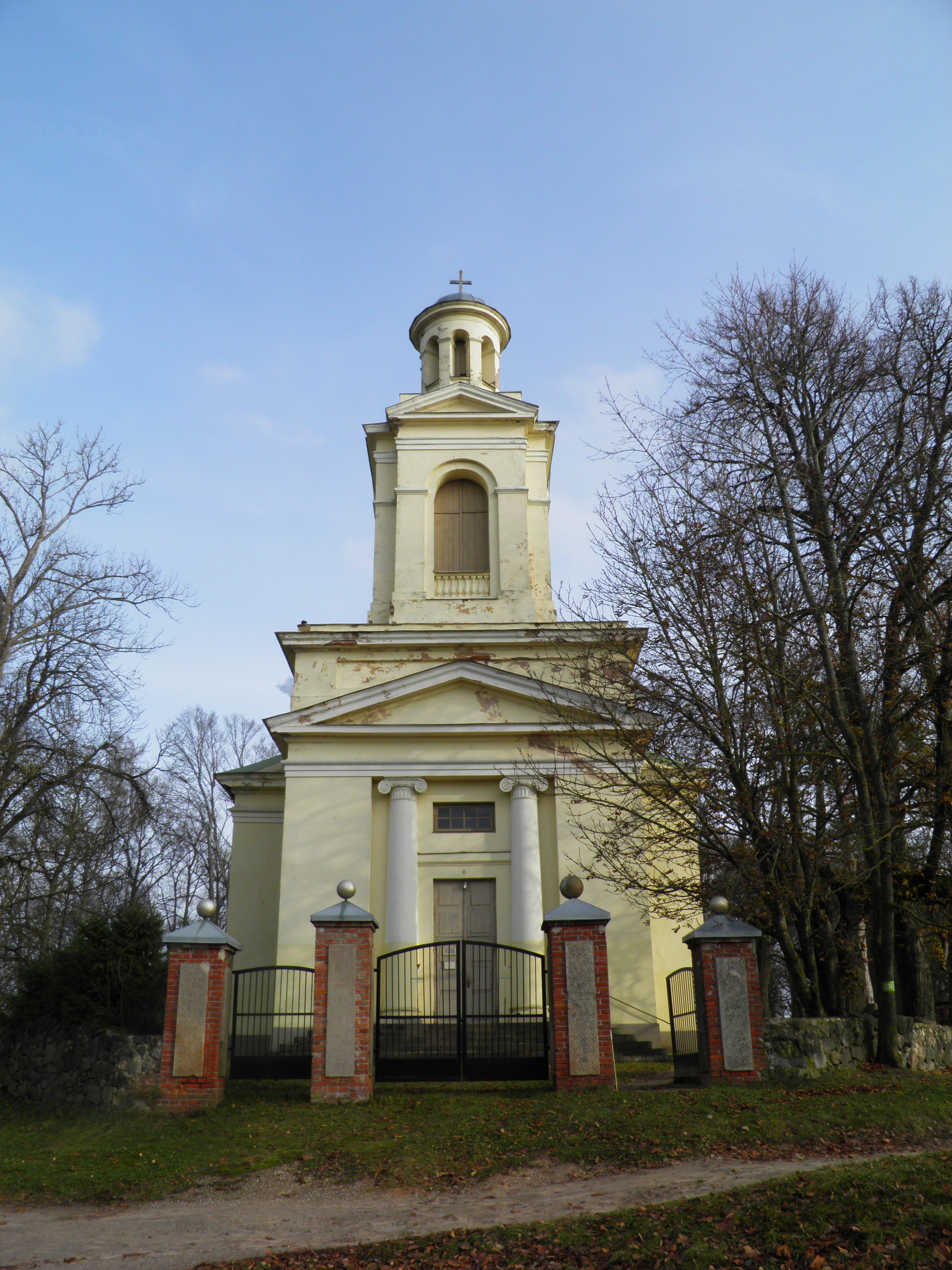
- Lutheran church

- Location within Latvia
- Country: Latvia
- Municipality: Bauska Municipality
- Post code: LV-3933
- Website: Vecumnieki municipality

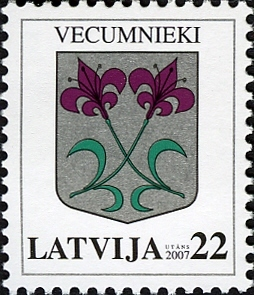
Latvian postage stamp

Vecumnieki is a village in the Vecumnieki Parish of Bauska Municipality in the Semigallia region of Latvia. Vecumnieki is 51 km southeast of Riga city center. The population of Vecumnieki was 2103 as of 2015. The village is just north of the Jelgava-Krustpils railroad.

Buses from Riga to Skaistkalne, Ilūkste and Nereta stop at Vecumnieki.

Two reservoirs have been created on stream Taļķe - Old Lake and New Lake.

== History ==
Vecumnieki is a historically established settlement, founded in the 2nd-9th centuries according to archeological evidences found in Gypsy castle mound.

The Old Town of Vecumnieki historically has been home to the Drächen Manor (Gut Drakken), the Mansion Manor (Gut Mißhof), the Reschenhof Manor, the (Gut Wiexten, in Umparte), Vecmuiža (Neugut, in Vecumnieki).

Until 1940 the parish was called Vecmuižas pagasts. The Vecumnieki name until 1940 was Vecmuiža ("Neugut").

In 17th and 18th centuries early smelt iron furnaces were operating here.

In 1925, Vecmuiža was granted the status of densely populated areas (village).

== Attraction ==
The small Vecumnieki Parish Museum is dedicated to scientist, historian and diplomat Arnolds Spekke and local history.

== People ==
- Ainārs Kovals, track and field athlete who competes in the javelin throw
- Ingmārs Līdaka, zoologist and politician, head of Riga Zoo
