= Vecumnieki Parish =

Parish of Latvia

- parish of Latvia
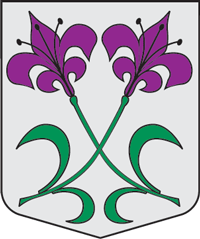
- Coat of arms

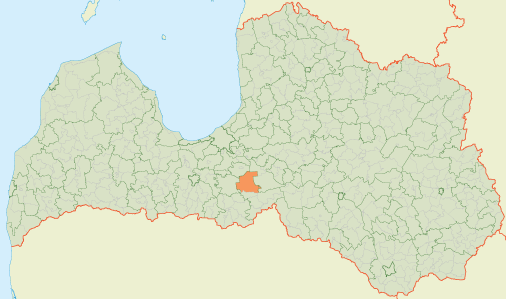
- Coordinates: 56°37′14″N 24°30′19″E
- Country: Latvia

Population (1 January 2026)
  - Total: 3,821

Vecumnieki Parish (Latvian: Vecumnieku pagasts) is an administrative unit of Bauska Municipality in the Semigallia region of Latvia.

== History ==
The Old Town of Vecumnieki historically has been home to the Drächen Manor ( Gut Drakken ), the Mansion Manor ( Gut Mißhof ), the Reschenhof Manor, the (Gut Wiexten, in Umparte ), Vecmuiža (Neugut, in Vecumnieki).

Until 1940 the parish was called Vecmuižas pagasts. In 1935, its area was 255.3 km^{2}. In 1945, Vecumnieki, Birznieku, Umpartes and Vīksniņa village were formed in the parish, but the parish was liquidated in 1949. In 1951, the territory of Kolkhoz the "Red Star" in Vīksniņa village was added to the village of Vecumnieki, in 1954 villages of Birznieki and Umparte both were added as well. In 1977, small areas were exchanged with Birzgale Parish. In 1990, the village was reorganized into a parish. In 2009, the parish was included as one of the administrative territories of the Vecumnieki Municipality.

== Towns, villages and settlements of Vecumnieki parish ==
- Vecumnieki
