= Skaistkalne Parish =

Parish of Latvia

- parish of Latvia
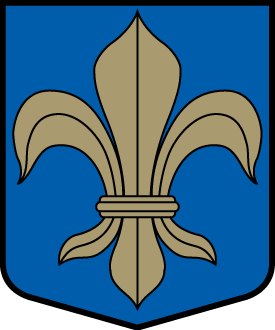
- Coat of arms

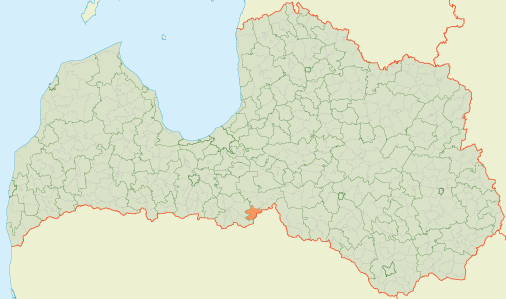
- 56°22′38″N 24°34′20″E
- Country: Latvia

Area
  - Total: 106.20 km^{2} (41.00 sq mi)
  - Land: 104.47 km^{2} (40.34 sq mi)
  - Water: 1.73 km^{2} (0.67 sq mi)

Population (1 January 2024)
  - Total: 929
  - Density: 8.7/km^{2} (23/sq mi)

Skaistkalne Parish (Latvian: Skaistkalnes pagasts) is an administrative unit of Bauska Municipality in the Semigallia region of Latvia. Prior to the 2009 administrative reforms it was part of Bauska district.

== History ==
The present territory of Skaistkalne Parish is located in the ancient Medene land.

The name derives from the name of the first owner Herman Schönberg (from German: Schönberg - "beautiful mountain"). Until 1925 the parish was called Shenberg's Parish.

In the territory of the present day Skaistkalne parish, there was historically a manor house of Annelsele (Gut Hahns-Memelshof, Mēmele), Jaunsaule Manor ( Gut Neu-Rahden , Saules), Schoenberg manor ( Gut Schönberg , Skaistkalne).

In 1935 the parish area was 87.8 km^{2}. In 1945, in the Skaistkalne parish and village council were established, but the parish was liquidated in 1949. In 1951, the territory of Skaistkalne, the village of kolhoz was added to the village of Skaistkalne. In 1963 Jaunsaules village was added, but the territory of Skaistkalne village "New Guard" was included in Kurmene Parish. Part of the territory of Vecsaule Parish was added in 1977 . In 1990, the village was reorganized into parish. In 2009, the parish was included into an administrative territory Vecumnieki Municipality.

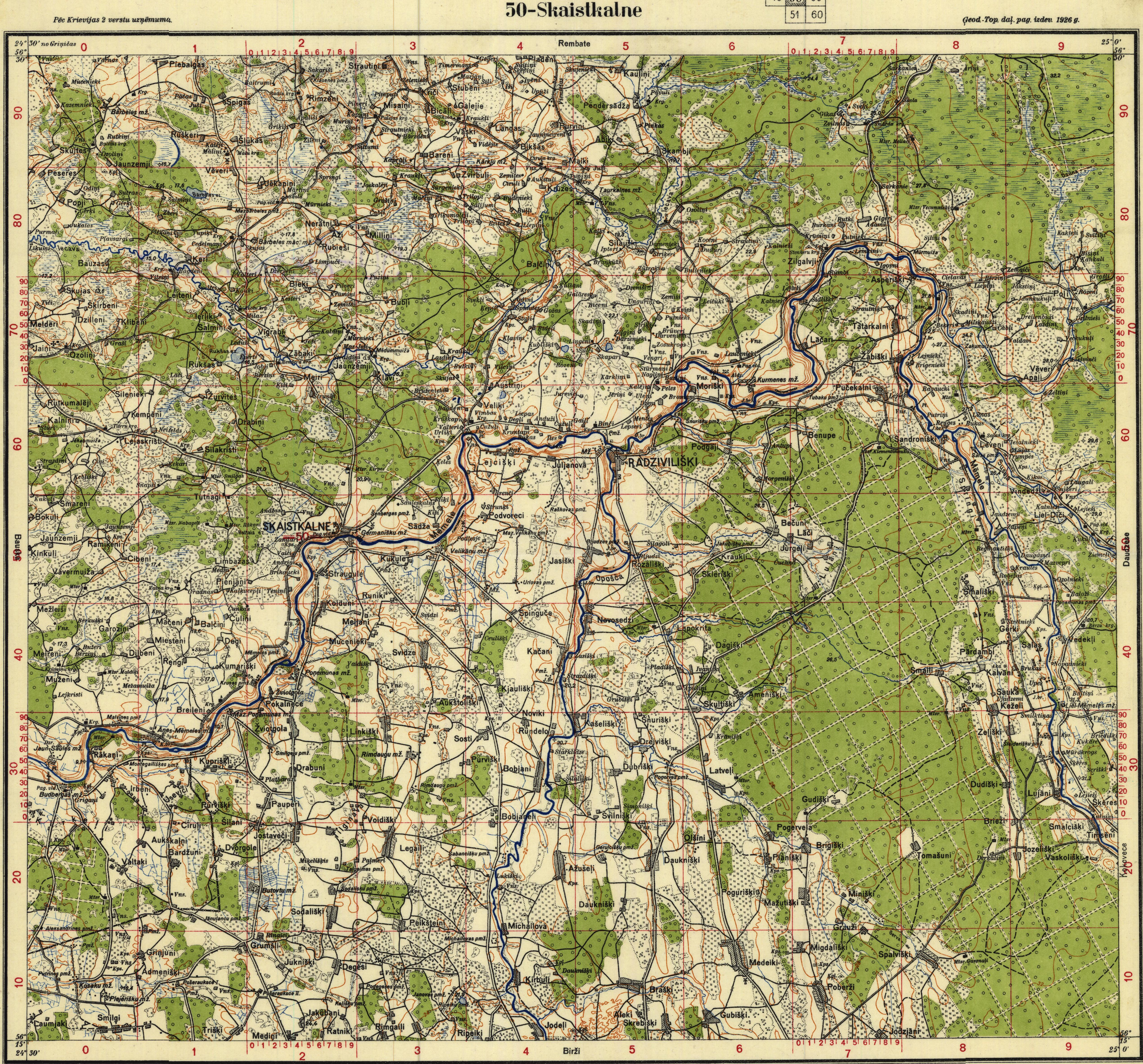
Skaistkalne and Kurmene neighborhood 1925 topographic map
