= Eglaine Parish =

Parish in Latvia

- parish of Latvia
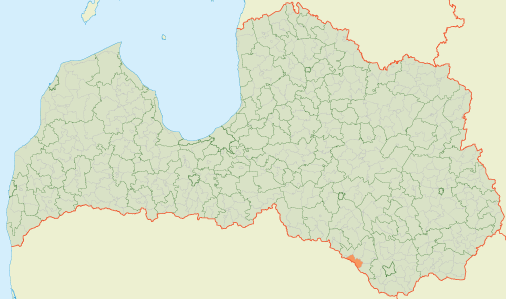
- Coordinates: 55°58′18″N 26°03′10″E
- Country: Latvia

Population (1 January 2026)
  - Total: 551

Eglaine Parish (Latvian: Eglaines pagasts) is an administrative unit of Augšdaugava Municipality in the Selonia region of Latvia.

== Villages ==
- Annasmuiža
- Baltmuiža
- Eglaine
- Laši
- Vitkuški

== See also ==
- Gotthard Friedrich Stender
