= Eglaine =

Village in Latvia

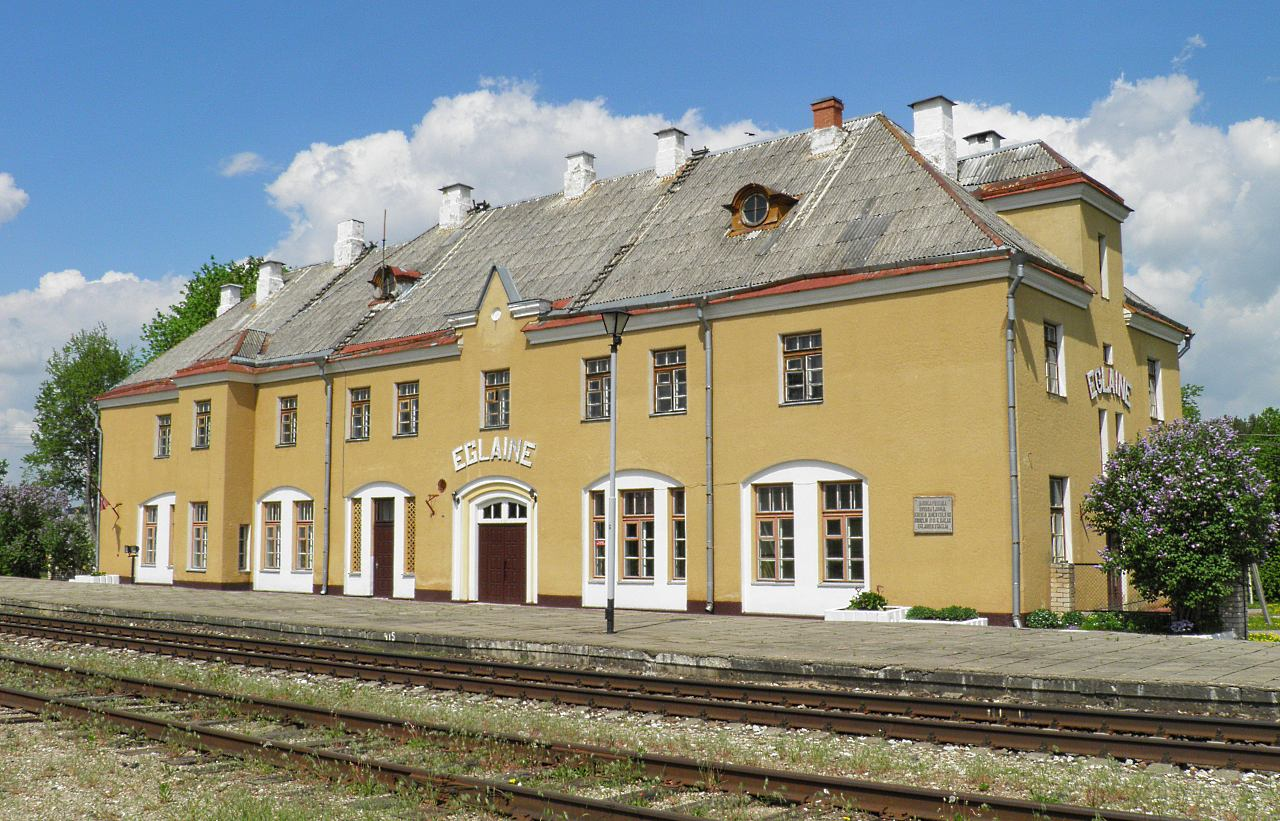
- Eglaine railway station

- Location within Latvia
- Coordinates: 55°57′0″N 26°8′0″E
- Country: Latvia
- municipality: Augšdaugava Municipality

Population (2006)
  - Total: 479
- Time zone: UTC+2 (EET)
  - Summer (DST): UTC+3 (EEST)

Eglaine is a settlement in Eglaine Parish in Augšdaugava Municipality in the Selonia region of Latvia.
