= Sunākste Parish =

Parish of Latvia

- parish of Latvia
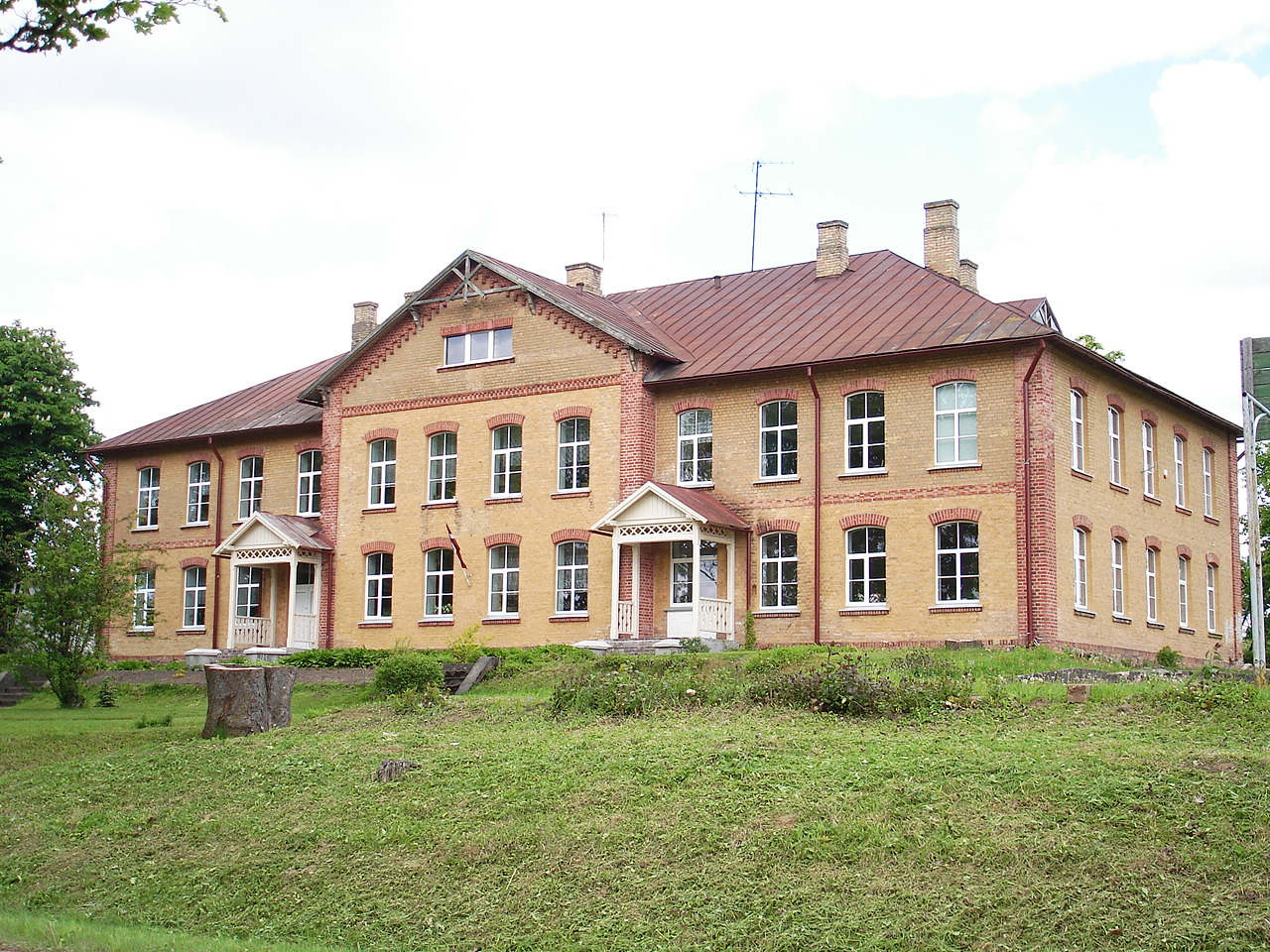

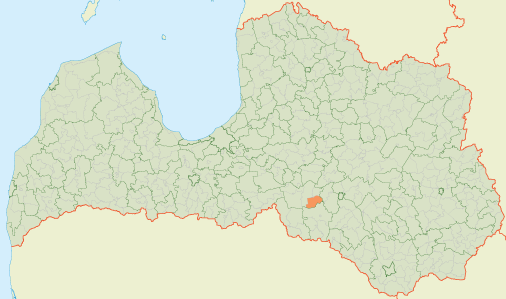
- 56°27′40″N 25°28′03″E
- Country: Latvia

Area
  - Total: 106.63 km^{2} (41.17 sq mi)
  - Land: 106.63 km^{2} (41.17 sq mi)
  - Water: 2.46 km^{2} (0.95 sq mi)

Population (1 January 2024)
  - Total: 366
  - Density: 3.4/km^{2} (8.9/sq mi)

Sunākste Parish (Latvian: Sunākstes pagasts) is an administrative unit of Aizkraukle Municipality in the Selonia region of Latvia. It covers 109 km^{2} of gently rolling farmland and mixed woodland in the northern foothills of the Augšzeme Highlands, part of the historical Selonia region. Its administrative centre is the linear village of Sunākste; other settlements include Lielsunākste and Pikslauki. According to the Central Statistical Bureau, the parish had 366 residents on 1 January 2024, giving a population density of just 3.4 inhabitants per square kilometre.

Created as a local government unit during Latvia's first republic, Sunākste Parish was dissolved in the 1949 Soviet reform, re-established in 1990 and attached to Jaunjelgava Municipality in 2009. The national territorial reform of 1 July 2021 transferred it to the enlarged Aizkraukle Municipality, where it remains currently.

The parish's landmark is its white Empire style-style Evangelical Lutheran church, built 1827–1829; inside are memorial tablets to First World War dead and Soviet-era deportees, while a granite stele (1989) honours the Enlightenment pastor-writer Gotthard Friedrich Stender. A 300-metre "Alphabet Trail" (Ābeces taka) laid out in 2014 winds through the former parsonage park, displaying wooden panels with the illustrated letters from Stender's 1787 primer. Behind the Lutheran church a low hill shelters the Stender family cemetery, while the sculpture ensemble Gaismas vārti ("Gates of Light") was unveiled nearby in 2023 to reinforce the educational theme.

In March 2025 Aizkraukle Municipality introduced a stylised community sign for Sunākste depicting twin springs, veteran oaks and a rowan "eye", intended to express the parish's twin drainage basins and folk traditions.

The parish contains two regionally important archaeological monuments: the flat medieval burial grounds at Cirši and Mazlāči, both entered on Latvia's National List of State-Protected Cultural Monuments as items 135 and 136. A 2023 decree by the National Heritage Board imposes a 500-metre protection belt round each site and requires archaeological oversight before any ground disturbance, forestry or building work.

== Towns, villages and settlements of Sunākste Parish ==
- Lielsunākste
- Mazsunākste
- Pikslauki
- Sunākste
- Zilkalne
