= Estonian Land Reform of 1919 =

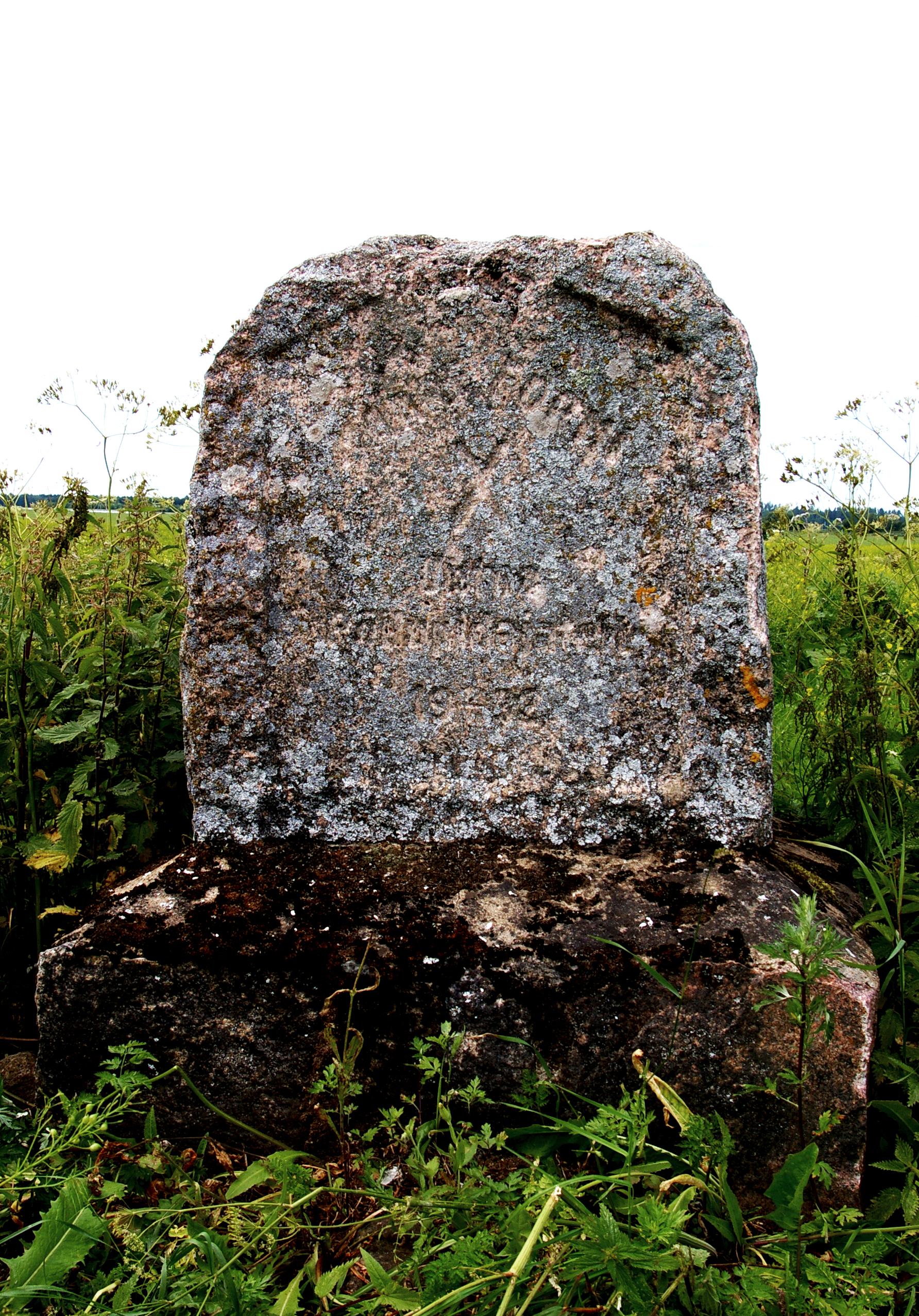
A landmark erected on the 10th anniversary of the land reform by farmers in Uhtna

The Estonian Land Reform Act 1919 was a land reform act passed in Estonia on 10 October 1919, shortly after the country had gained independence in the previous year. The act expropriated land from the mostly ethnic Baltic German landowners which had previously made up much of the local landowning elite. As part of the implementation of the act the government distributed the nationalised land to mainly ethnic Estonian small farmers.

== Distribution of land ==
The reforms expropriated 1065 manors (96.6% of large landowners were affected) of which only 57 manors came from ethnic Estonian owners with the rest owned mainly by Baltic Germans along with land which had been previously owned by the state (former Russian Empire) or by the church. The amount of land in total nationalised came to over 2.34 million hectares of land which accounted for 58% of the total agricultural land in Estonia. Manorial industrial enterprises were also nationalised by the state and sold (this included 225 vodka factories, 344 mills, 74 sawmills, 64 stone and clay industries, 18 dairies and 7 breweries). Overall about 53,000 Estonian settlers received expropriated land with 1.2mn hectares going to the 23,000 individuals affected by the land reform (though 3.6% of the expropriated land was returned to the former owner).

== Compensation ==
In 1926 the previous landowners affected by the reforms (mostly large native landowners) received a small amount of compensation.

== See also ==
- Land reforms by country
- Estonian Land Reform of 1991
- Latvian Land Reform of 1920
