= Gotthard Friedrich Stender =

Baltic German pastor (1714-1796)

- Gothards Frīdrihs Stenders
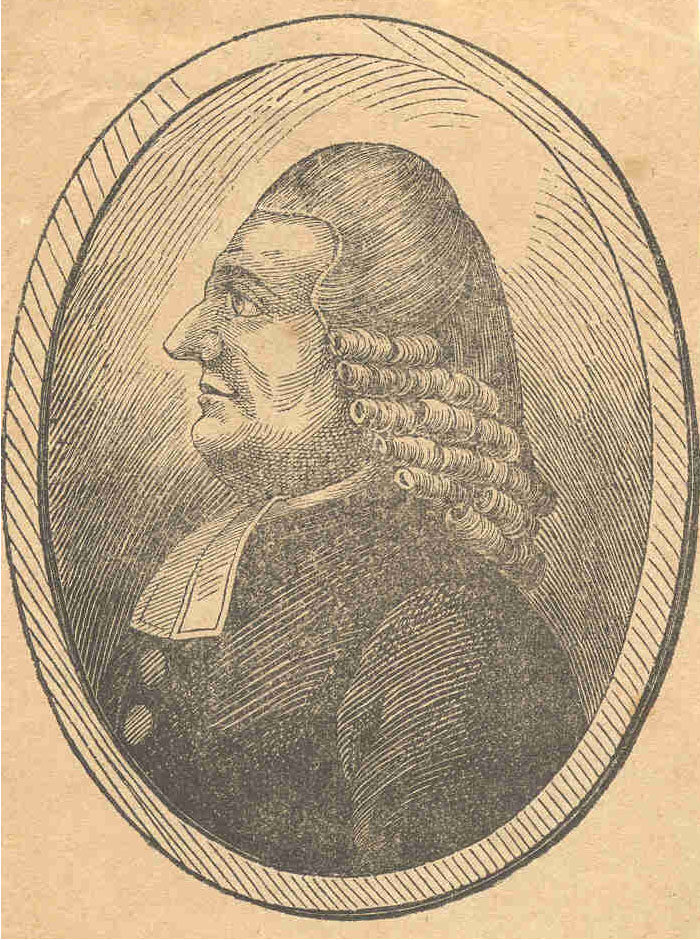
- Gotthard Friedrich Stender, 1753
- Born: 27 August 1714; Lassen pastorat, Oberhauptmannschaft Selburg, Duchy of Courland and Semigallia (Now Laši, Eglaine Parish, Ilūkste Municipality, Latvia)
- Died: 17 May 1796 (aged 81); Sunaxt pastorat, Courland Governorate, Russian Empire (Sunākste Parish, Jaunjelgava Municipality, Latvia
- Education: University of Jena; University of Halle
- Occupation: Lutheran pastor
- Known for: Latvian grammarian
- Children: 5, including Alexander Johann Stender
- Relatives: Georg Stender (brother; ?–1789)

Gotthard Friedrich Stender (Latvian: Gothards Frīdrihs Stenders or Ģederts Fridriks Štenders; 27 August 1714 – 17 May 1796), also called Old Stender (Vecais Stenders), was a Baltic German Lutheran pastor who played an outstanding role in Latvia's history of culture. He was the first Latvian grammarian and lexicographer, founder of the Latvian secular literature in the 18th century. In the spirit of Enlightenment, he wrote the first Latvian-German and German-Latvian dictionaries, wrote the first encyclopedia “A Book of High Wisdom on the World and Nature” (1774), and wrote the first illustrated Latvian alphabet book (1787).

== Biography ==
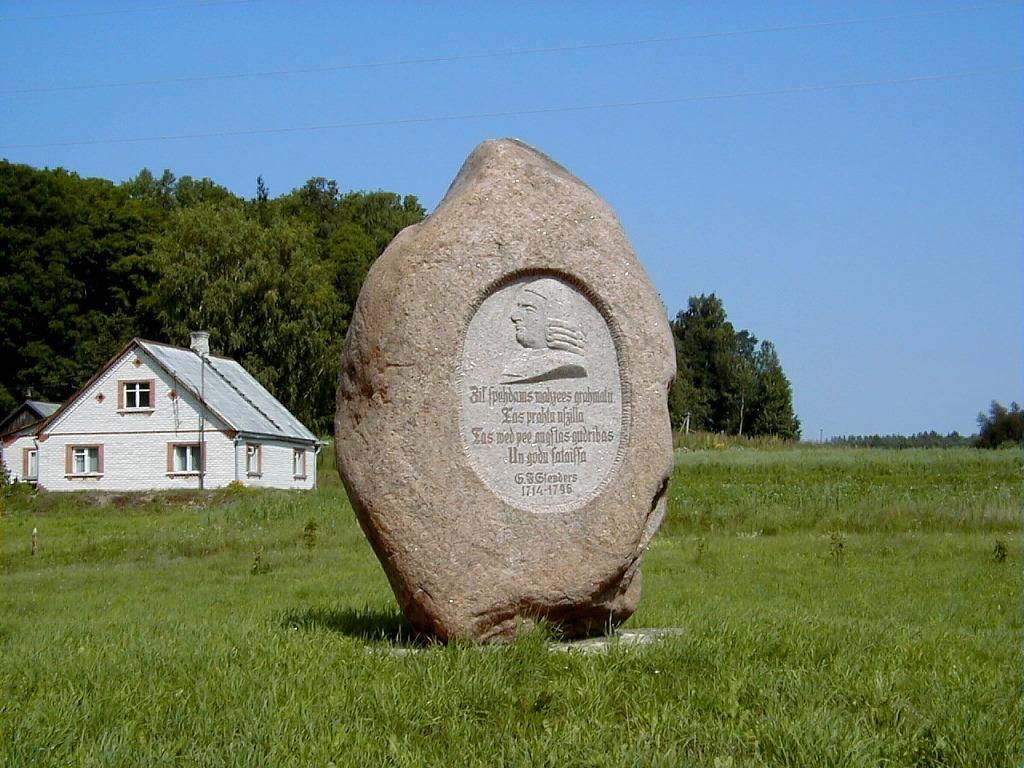
Stender memorial near his birthplace at Laši in Eglaine Parish

Gotthard Friedrich Stender was born in Laši in the family of the Lutheran pastor Hermann Konrad Stender. His grandfather was also a pastor in the Selonia region of Duchy of Courland. He got his first education from his father, but later studied in Subate German school where one of his main interests was Latin. From 1736 until 1739, Stender studied theology, rhetoric and ancient languages in universities of Jena and Halle. Upon returning to Courland he worked as a private tutor in Lielbērstele, a teacher in Jelgava and from 1744 a Lutheran pastor in Linde-Birzgale and later Žeimelis parish.

In 1759, together with his family, Stender relocated to Königslutter in Duchy of Brunswick-Lüneburg, where he worked as a rector for a local school, but a few months later after a conflict with a local clergyman, they moved to Copenhagen, where he worked as a geography teacher at a cadet school. There, using an innovative approach he made a globe for King of Denmark Frederik V. Stender also became interested in ideas of Freemasonry and became a member of a lodge.

In 1765, Stender returned to Duchy of Courland and Semigallia. For the rest of his life, he served as a pastor in the Sēlpils and Sunākste parishes. Gotthard Friedrich Stender died in his home in Sunākste, 17 May 1796. His son Alexander Johann Stender, grandson Johann Christian Stender and great-grandson Karl Gottlob Stender were all Lutheran pastors as well.

== Works ==
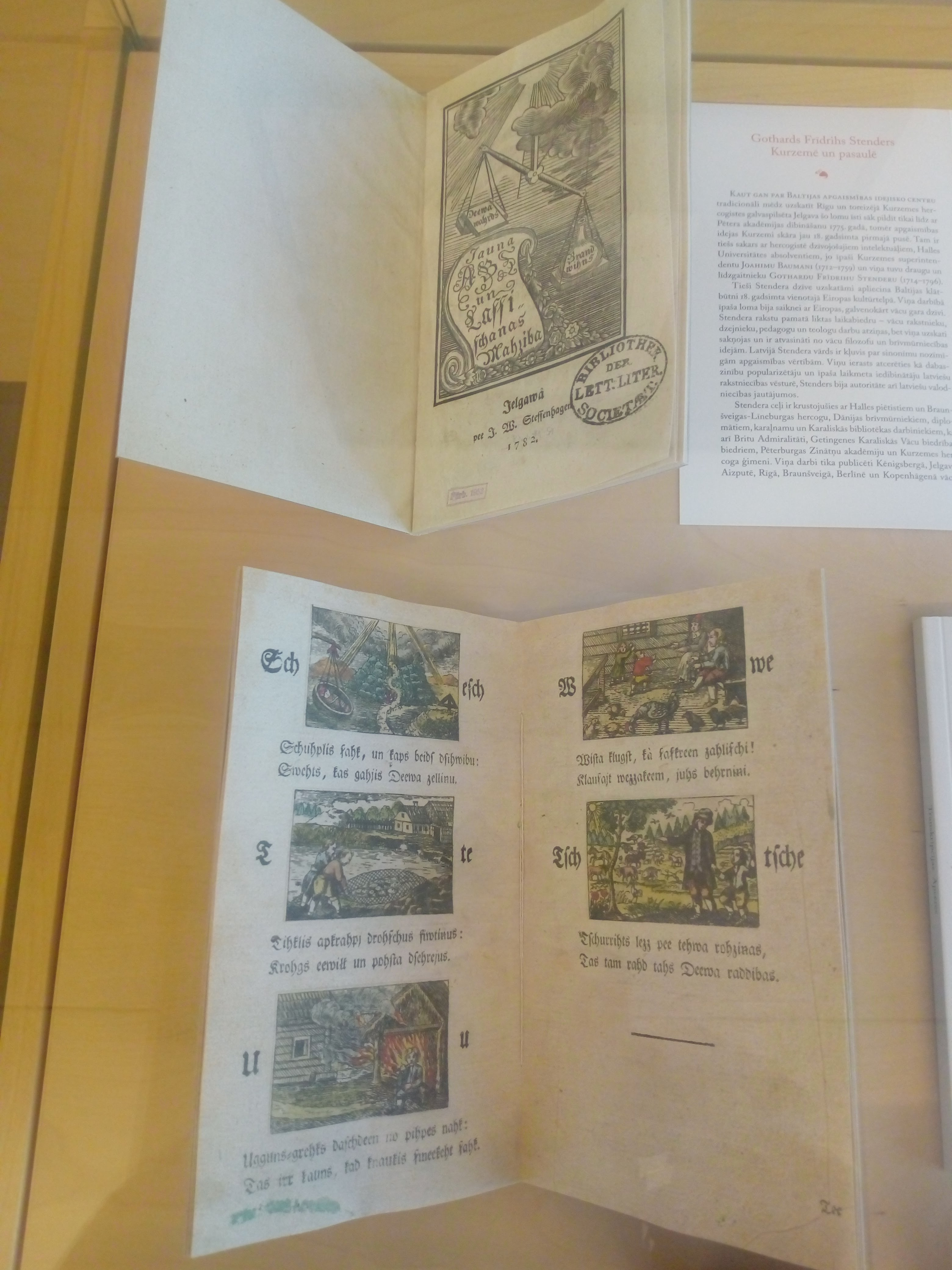
Stender's "New Teaching of ABC and Reading" (Jauna ABC un Lassischanas Mahziba) at the National Library of Latvia

Stender produced didactic tales and idyllic poems meant to educate and uplift the Latvian peasants who were oppressed by serfdom. He wrote secular poetry ranging from philosophical odes to the grandeur of nature to unpretentious, folksy songs, which widely influenced the literary taste of the nation, and won extreme popularity. His works, although written in a simple language and style, meant for the barely educated 18th century Latvians, promoted education in Latvian schools throughout the whole 19th century. His Latvian grammar book and a dictionary was used not only by Latvians and Baltic Germans, but also by foreign linguists from all over Europe. Stender, along with Johann Gottfried Herder, was the first author who analysed dainas, riddles, proverbs and sayings.

== Commemoration ==
In 2014, on the 300th anniversary of Gotthard Friedrich Stender's birthday, the Bank of Latvia released a euro silver commemorative coin dedicated to Stender.
