= Ķegums Municipality =

Municipality of Latvia

Coordinates: 56°44′N 24°42′E

Ķegums Municipality Ķeguma novads
- Municipality
- Coat of arms

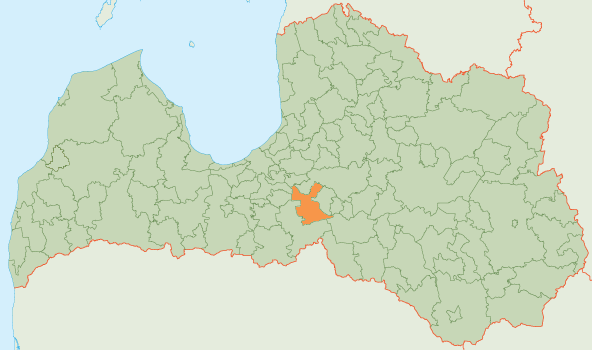
- Country: Latvia
- Formed: 2002
- Centre: Ķegums

Government
  - Council Chair: Raivis Ūzuls (VP)

Area
  - Total: 491.97 km^{2} (189.95 sq mi)
  - Land: 467.65 km^{2} (180.56 sq mi)
  - Water: 24.32 km^{2} (9.39 sq mi)

Population (2021)
  - Total: 5,313
  - Density: 11.36/km^{2} (29.43/sq mi)
- Website: www.kegums.lv

Ķegums Municipality (Latvian: Ķeguma novads) is a former municipality in Latvia. The municipality was formed in 2002 by merging Rembate parish and Ķegums town with its countryside territory. In 2009 it absorbed Birzgale parish, too the administrative centre being Ķegums.

On 1 July 2021, Ķegums Municipality ceased to exist and its territory was merged into Ogre Municipality.

== See also ==
- Administrative divisions of Latvia (2009)
