= Ingmārs Līdaka =

Latvian politician

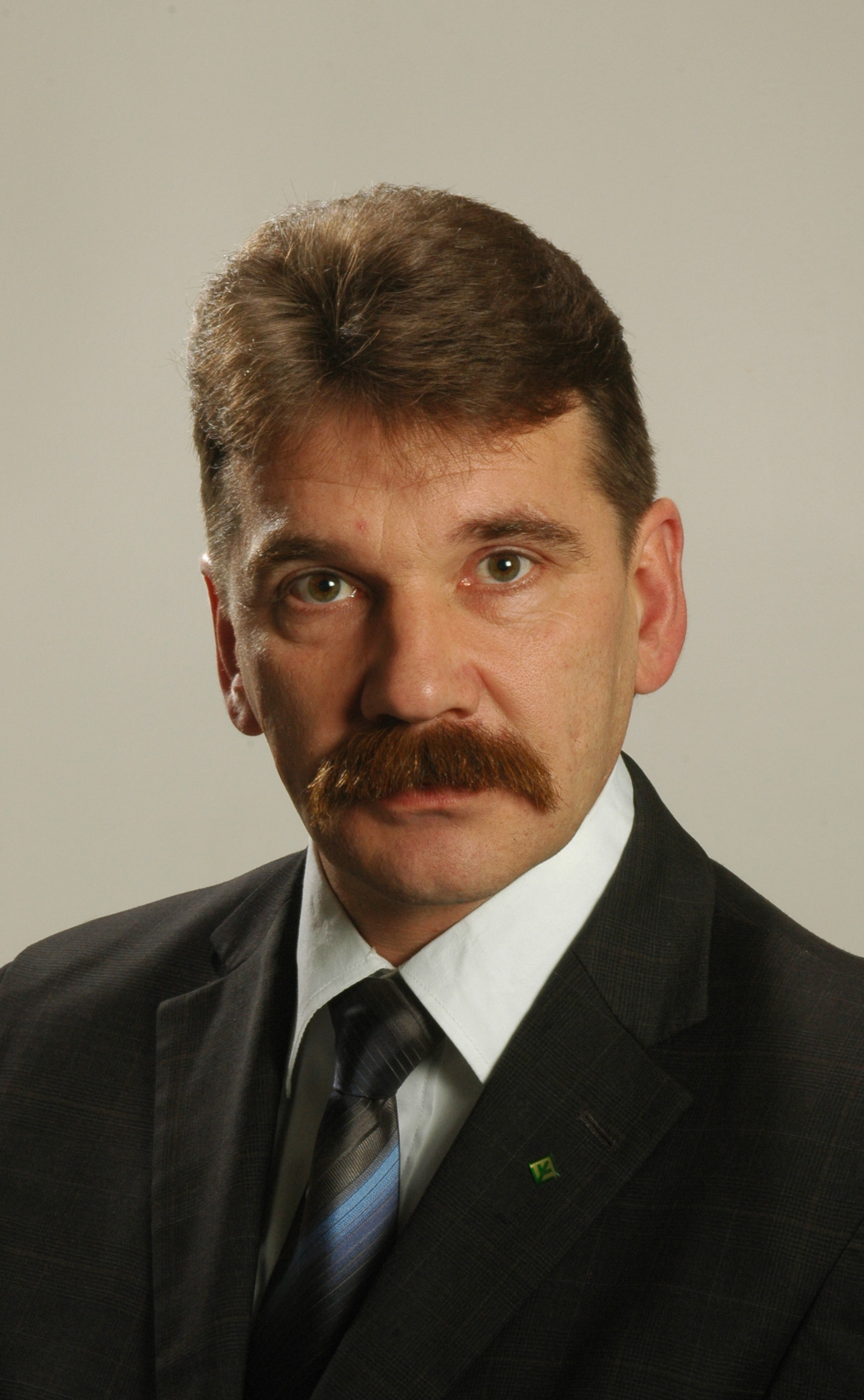

former Deputy of the Saeima

Personal details
- Born: 13 August 1966 (age 60) Vecumnieki, Latvian SSR
- Party: Union of Greens and Farmers
- Children: 2
- Education: University of Latvia
- Profession: Zoologist

Ingmārs Līdaka (born 13 August 1966, Vecumnieki) is a Latvian zoologist and politician who has represented the Union of Greens and Farmers in the Saeima, the Latvian national parliament.

Prior to entering politics, Līdaka worked at Riga Zoo as a public relations specialist. He entered politics in 1995 when he was elected to Riga City Council and was later elected to the Saeima. He became better known following a parliamentary debate on when to fly the Latvian national flag in 2009 when, after his speech was interrupted by members of other parties, he shouted "Aizver muti!" (shut your mouth!) This became a popular phrase in Latvia, with the YouTube video of the incident receiving over 85,000 views and numerous T-shirts bearing the phrase being sold. Līdaka also authored a book Zoodārzs manā pagalmā (The zoo in my backyard.)

In March 2018, he resigned from the Saeima to become head of Riga Zoo, before later being re-elected to 14th Saeima.
