= Estonian Land Reform of 1991 =

The Estonian Land Reform Act 1991 (Estonian: 1991. Eesti maareform) was passed in Estonia on the 17 October and came into force on the 1 November shortly after the restoration of independence in 1991. The act involved the transfer of land from state to private ownership in accordance with the historic property rights of landowners before the 1940 Soviet occupation.

== Introduction ==
In October 1991, shortly after Estonia received its independence from the former Soviet Union, the Estonian parliament approved the 'Law on Land Reform'. This law regulated the transfer of land from state ownership to private owners. The main principles of this process were the restitution of property rights of landowners before the 1940 Soviet occupation, and the protection of the legal rights of the present users of land. The aim of the act was to reintroduce a market economy for land, which under Soviet occupation had been nationalised, and to encourage more effective land use. The law envisaged that a wide number of heirs of the former owner would be eligible to submit a claim for land. The law also fixed compensation for the full amount of land at June 1940 values.

== Results ==
As of early 2015 the land reform has been successfully completed on 96% of Estonian territory.

== See also ==
- Land reforms by country
- Estonian Land Reform Act 1919
