= Stelpe Parish =

Parish of Latvia

- parish of Latvia
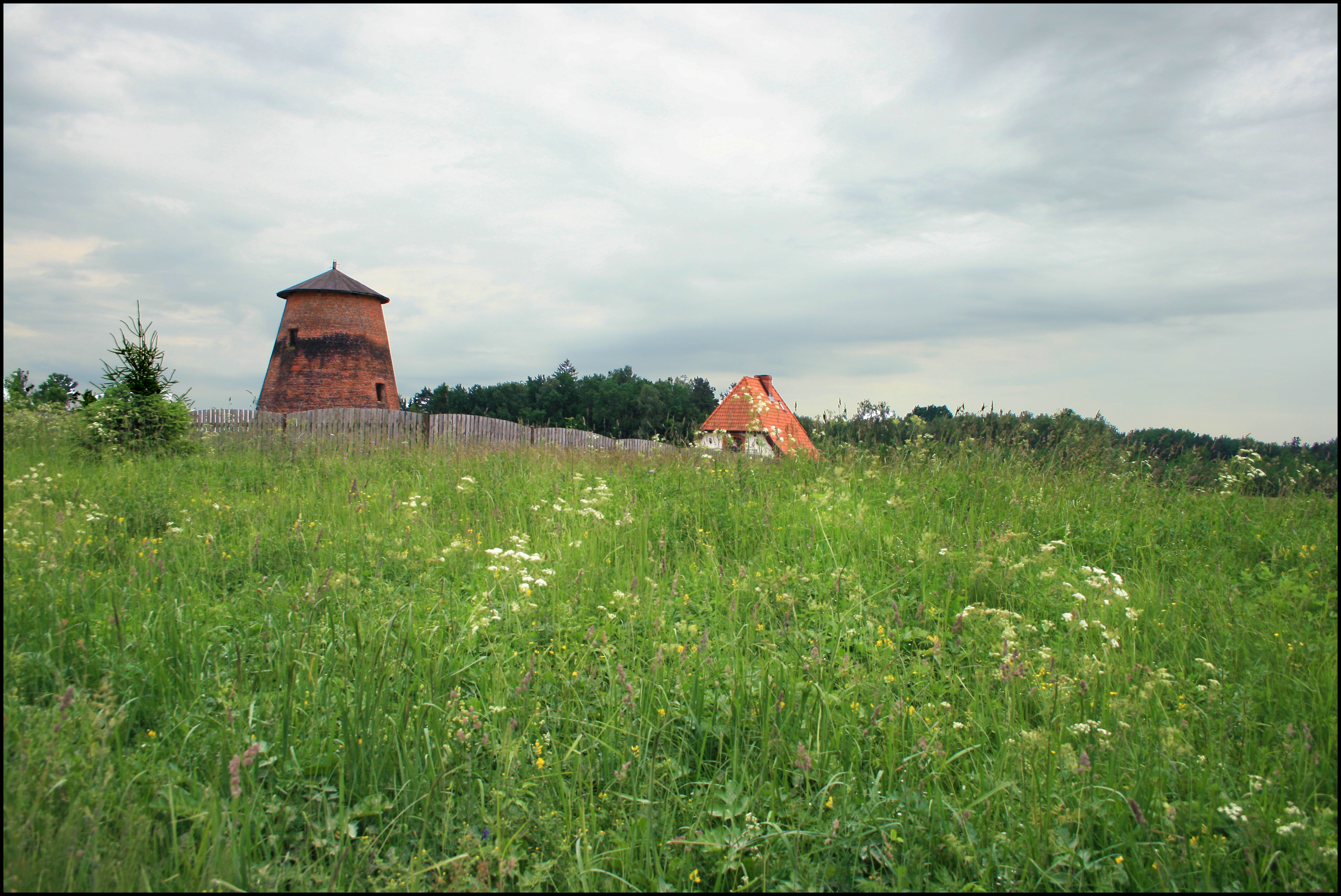

- Coat of arms

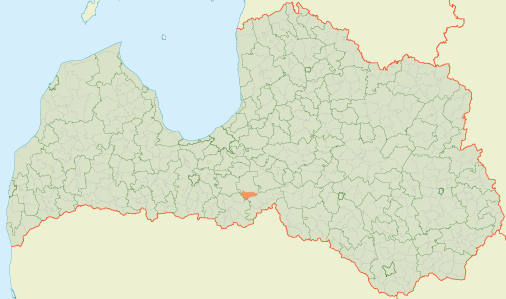
- 56°31′29″N 24°30′36″E

- Location within Latvia
- Country: Latvia

Area
  - Total: 68.49 km^{2} (26.44 sq mi)
  - Land: 66.1 km^{2} (25.5 sq mi)
  - Water: 2.39 km^{2} (0.92 sq mi)

Population (1 January 2026)
  - Total: 724
  - Density: 11.0/km^{2} (28.4/sq mi)

Stelpe Parish (Latvian: Stelpes pagasts) is an administrative unit of Bauska Municipality in the Semigallia region of Latvia. Prior to 2009, it was part of the former Bauska district.
