= Sophia von Mengden =

Sophia von Mengden (c. 1760 — 1848) was a major Baltic German landowner.

Born Sophie Elisabeth von Plettenberg, she was the daughter of George Friedrich von Plettenberg and Elisabeth Benigna von Hohen-Astenberg. In 1779 she married Gotthard Johann von Mengden (1752 — 1786).

After the death of her husband, she became a major landholder with residence in Mitau. She is regarded to have been one of the more significant landowners in Latvia of her time. She moved to London in 1813.

Even before abolition of serfdom in Livonia in 1816, in her capacity as the owner of Linde Manor Sophia von Mengden published three law books for her people, namely, "Duties, Works and Hearings of Linde and Birzgale Parishes" (1796), "Soldiers 'or Recruits' Messli" (1805) and "Linde and Birzgale Farmer's or Parish Court" (1805).

== See also ==
- Linde Manor
