= Skaistkalne =

Village in Latvia

- Village
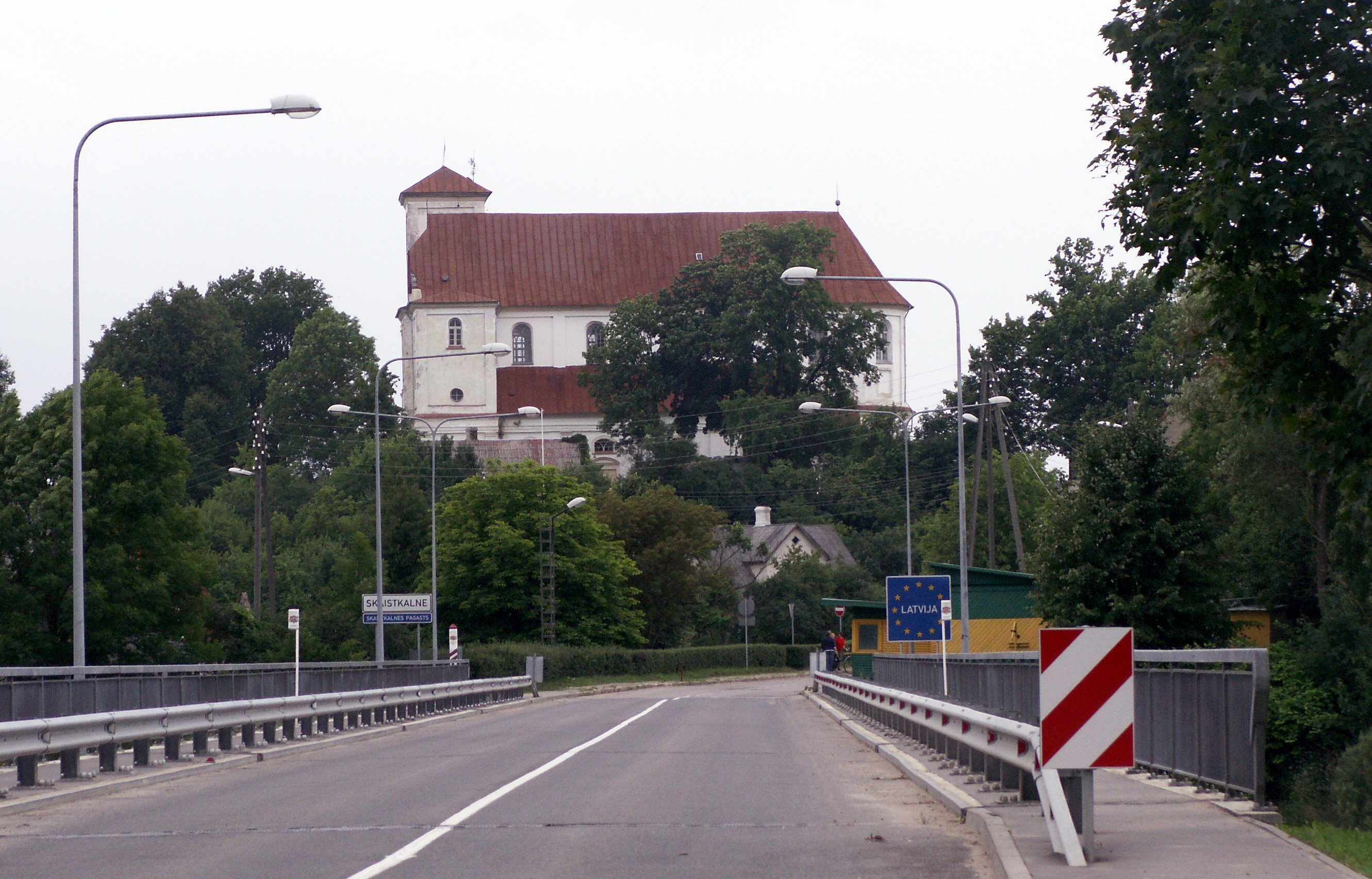
- Entrance to Skaistkalne from Lithuanian side

- Skaistkalne's location in Latvia
- Coordinates: 56°22′45.92″N 24°38′36.24″E
- Country: Latvia
- Municipality: Bauska
- Parish: Skaistkalne
- First time mentioned: 1489

Population (2007)
  - Total: 692

Skaistkalne (formerly Šēnberga, German: Schönberg, Yiddish: שימבורג, romanized: Shimberg) is a village in Skaistkalne Parish, Bauska Municipality in the Semigallia region of Latvia. It is the centre of Skaistkalne Parish.

== History ==
In historical sources Skaistkalne was first mentioned in 1489. In that year Master of the Livonian Order Johann Freytag von Loringhoven granted lands between rivers Mēmele and Iecava to Herman Schönberg. Thus the name of Skaistkalne also came from the first owner. Since 1660, the oldest wooden church was serviced by the Jesuit Order, which established a permanent mission in 1666 and a monastery in 1677. In 1692 the new Roman Catholic Church of the Assumption of the Blessed Virgin Mary of Skaistkalne and a Monastery were built here in the Italian Baroque style. The former governor of the province, Peter Lacy .d 1751, is buried in the crypt Between 1774 and 1929, Catholic priests served in the Skaistkalne old Church and Church of Our Lady. Skaistkalne became the main center of Catholicism in Zemgale. In the 19th century Skaistkalne became an important market center. There were 10 large trade fairs and weekly markets every year. At the beginning of the 20th century, there were about 500 inhabitants in Skaistkalne (Schenberg), mainly Jews engaged in trade and crafts. In 1920 there were 39 houses and 520 inhabitants in the village. In 1925, the village was granted a densely populated area (village) status and the Germannic name Šēnberga changed to Latvian Skaistkalne (German: Schönberg - "beautiful mountain"). On November 30, 1929, the church was taken over by the Order of Capuchin, who led the Skaistkalne church until it abolition by the Soviet Union during the occupation of 1949. From 1949 to 2001, the Roman Catholic Church of Skaistkalne was served by diocesan Catholic priests. On August 31, 2001, the Church and Church of Our Lady were both taken over by the Order of Saint Paul the First Hermit. During the Soviet era Skaistkalne was the center of collective farm "Skaistkalne" and in 1989 there were 854 inhabitants in the village.

== Notable residents ==
- Elisa von der Recke (1754–1833), a Baltic German writer and poet, was born here.
