= Valle Parish =

Parish of Latvia

- parish of Latvia
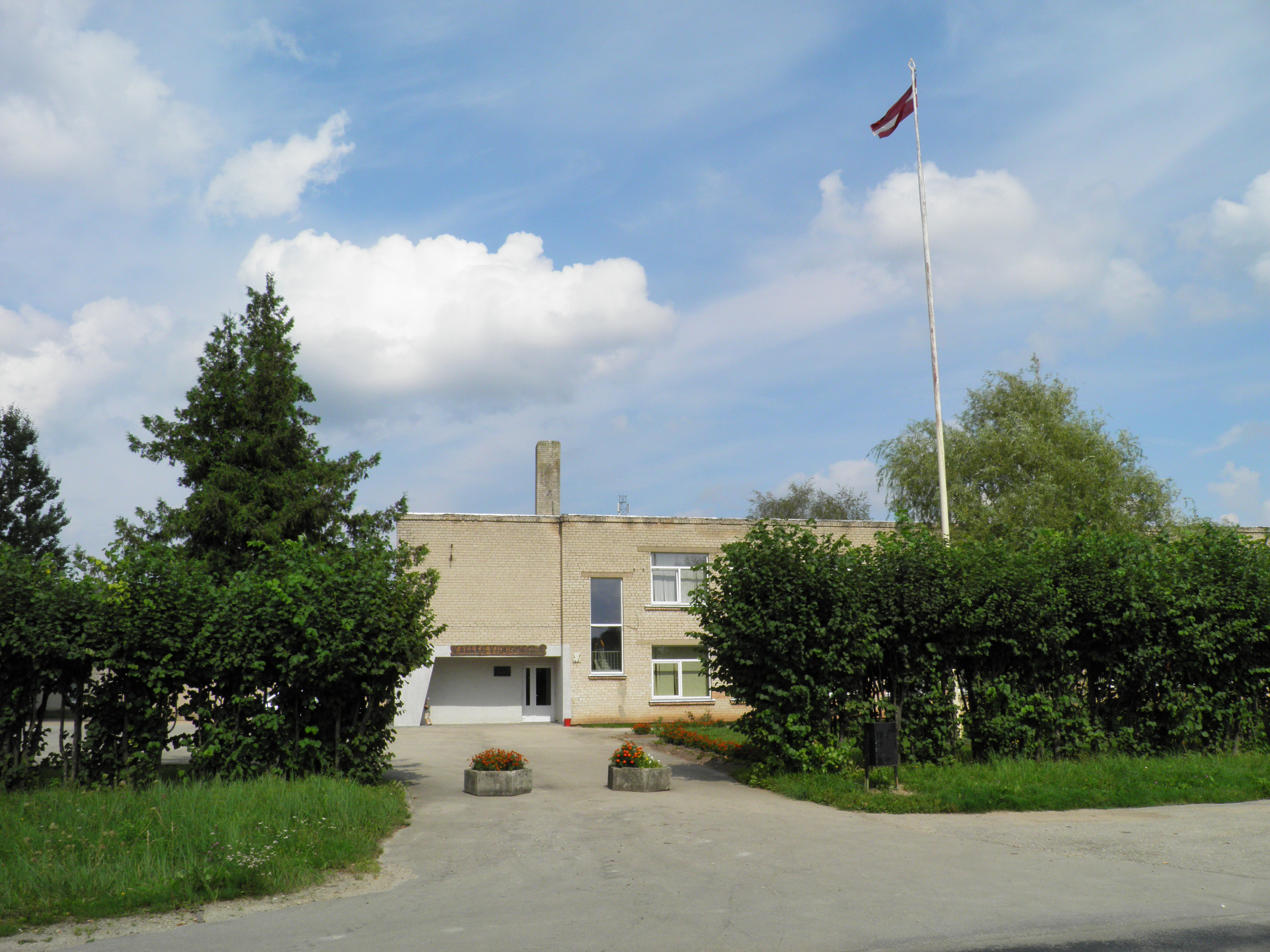

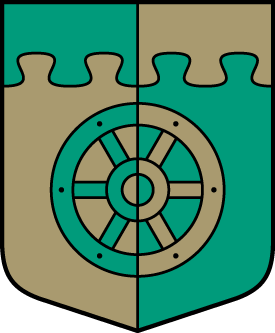
- Coat of arms

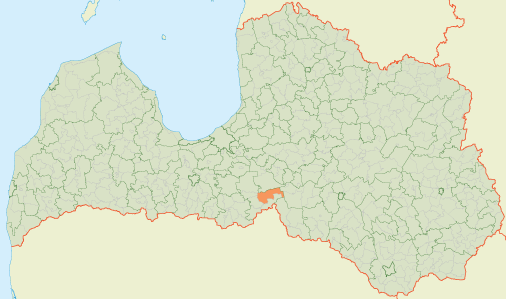
- 56°31′15″N 24°48′46″E
- Country: Latvia

Area
  - Total: 178.93 km^{2} (69.09 sq mi)
  - Land: 177.11 km^{2} (68.38 sq mi)
  - Water: 1.82 km^{2} (0.70 sq mi)

Population (1 January 2025)
  - Total: 837
  - Density: 4.73/km^{2} (12.2/sq mi)

Valle Parish (Latvian: Valles pagasts) is an administrative unit of Bauska Municipality in the Semigallia region of Latvia. Prior to 2009, it was part of Aizkraukle district, Latvia.

== Towns, villages and settlements of Valle Parish ==
- Krīči
- Liepkalni
- Mazvalle
- Mežmuiža
- Penderi
- Pētermuiža
- Reizeni
- Salas
- Taurkalne
- Tenteni
- Valle
