= Kurmene Parish =

Administrative unit of the Vecumnieki Municipality, Latvia

- parish of Latvia
- Coat of arms

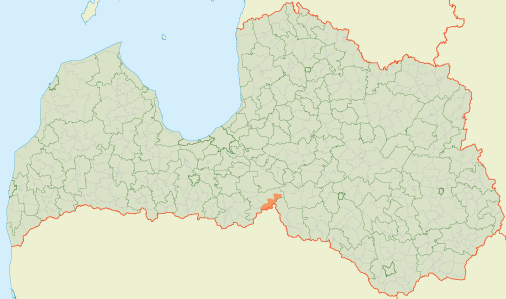
- 56°27′45″N 24°50′24″E

- Location within Latvia
- Country: Latvia

Area
  - Total: 111.88 km^{2} (43.20 sq mi)
  - Land: 109.97 km^{2} (42.46 sq mi)
  - Water: 1.91 km^{2} (0.74 sq mi)

Population (1 January 2026)
  - Total: 491
  - Density: 4.46/km^{2} (11.6/sq mi)

Kurmene Parish (Latvian: Kurmenes pagasts) is an administrative unit of Bauska Municipality in the Semigallia region of Latvia.

== Towns, villages and settlements of Kurmene Parish ==
- Kaijas
- Kurmene
- Vērdiņi
