= Latvian Land Reform of 1920 =

Land reform act in the Republic of Latvia

The Latvian Land Reform of 1920 (Latvian: 1920. gada agrārā reforma Latvijā) was a land reform act expropriating land under the Republic of Latvia in 1920 (during the Latvian War of Independence shortly after independence). The agrarian reform law of 1920 sought to transfer most of the land from Baltic German nobles to Latvian farmers. On 16 September 1920 the Constitutional Assembly of Latvia passed the law of the Land reform, which would break up large landholdings and redistribute land to those peasants who worked it and to the newly created Latvian State Land Fund. Similar land reforms were carried out in Estonia (1919), Lithuania (29 March 1922) and Poland (28 December 1925).

== Background ==
Before World War I some 2% of landowners owned 53% of the land in Kurzeme and Vidzeme, and 38% in Latgale. The agrarian reform law of 16 September 1920 created the State Land Fund which took over 61% of all land.

== Objective ==
The main objectives of the reform were several - the creation of new farms and the expansion of already existing smallholder farms, by so doing, the division of land of former large-scale farms into smaller land areas, thereby acquiring land for the creation of new farms. The creation of various economic enterprises, the satisfaction of social and cultural needs, is understood as implicit agrarian reform tasks as a consequence of the implementation of the reform. The aim of the reform was also to find opportunities for the expansion of cities and towns, which means that the territories borrowed from the state reserve reserved areas for the development of populated areas.

== Land reform law ==
The various parts of Land reform law have been adopted by Constitutional Assembly of Latvia at different times:

- Part I "On the Establishment of the State Land Fund" (paragraph 26) was adopted on 16 September 1920.
- Part II "On the Use of the State Land Fund" (Paragraph 19) was adopted by the Plenary Session of the Constituent Assembly on 21 December 1920.
- Part III "On strengthening agrarian reform" was issued on 3 May 1922.
- The Law "On the Transfer of the Land Allotted to Private Ownership or Grant in the Hire of a Family " was issued on 23 April 1923.
- Part IV "On Land Surveillance Committees" (paragraph 21) was adopted on 17 September 1920.

The land reform law expropriated the manor lands. Landowners were left with 50 hectares each and their land was distributed to the landless peasants without cost. In 1897, 61.2% of the rural population had been landless; by 1936, that percentage had been reduced to 18%. The extent of cultivated land surpassed the pre-war level already in 1923.

Before World War I, some 2% of landowners owned 53% of land in Kurzeme and Vidzeme, in Latgale it was 38%. The Agrarian reform Law of 16 September 1920 created the State Land Fund, which took over 61% of all land. The German nobles were left with no more than 50 ha of land. This destroyed their manor house system. Many of them sold their possessions and left for Germany. Former manor house buildings often were used as local schools, administrative buildings or hospitals. The land was distributed to a new class of smallholding farmers - over 54,000 Jaunsaimnieki (New farmers) with average farm size of 17.1 ha, who usually had to create their farms from nothing, building new houses and clearing fields in the process. Due to their small size and unfavorable grain prices, the new farmers rapidly developed dairy farming. Butter, bacon and eggs became new export industries.

== Economic results ==
The agrarian reform was finally completed in 1937, transforming the country's economy and the Latvian society. Agrarian reform can be regarded as a social revolution in which the foundations of changing agriculture were created from large-scale farms with large but economically inefficient farming units on small farms. Legislators counted on emerging farms as economically productive, viable and cost-effective entities at the time. Although many foreign economists questioned the economic justification of such a radical reform because it required huge investments - about 700 million lats, and therefore predicted an economic downturn. However agrarian reform led to a rapid economic growth due to increased productivity, increased agricultural output per hectare and increased size of productive agricultural land. When starting agrarian reform, Danish agriculture was largely a model, because it seemed most suitable for Latvia. Already in 1930, at the beginning of the year, the country was fully supplied with agricultural products and exports began to grow. In 1938 Latvia, as a milk and meat exporter, ranked fourth behind Denmark, Netherlands and Sweden.

== Social consequences and owners compensation ==
The driving force behind agrarian reform was more political than economic. As a result of agrarian reform the country's main natural treasures - land and forests changed it owners. The inherited feudal power over the state's main economic sectors was broken with elimination of feudal manor system, which connected inherited mansions (Rittergut) with land around it.

The previous landowners affected by the reforms, mostly ethnic Baltic Germans, did not receive any compensation, however they were left with a small fraction of their former lands.

In 1924 the Baltic Germans demanded a payment of 1,200 million gold francs for expropriated land properties through a group of six their representatives in Latvia's parliament. However just before the crucial vote on 30 April 1924, the Baltic German faction abandoned the hearing room, which led to the dismissal of the claim by a small majority. Later, the German-speaking parliamentary faction appealed against the State of Latvia in the League of Nations, requesting compensation for seized land, but that claim was also rejected.

In 1929 Latvia signed an agreement with Poland, which resolved the controversial issues that were mostly related to the Latgale region. The Latvian government paid 5 million lats for estates that were expropriated from Polish noblemen in course of agrarian reform.

== See also ==
- Latvian Farmers' Union
- Estonian Land Reform of 1919
- Estonian Land Reform of 1991
