= Iecava Municipality =

Municipality of Latvia

Coordinates: 56.5833°N 24.1833°E

Iecava Municipality Iecavas novads
- Municipality
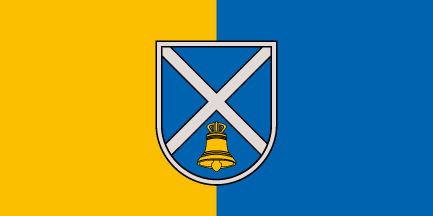
- Flag Coat of arms

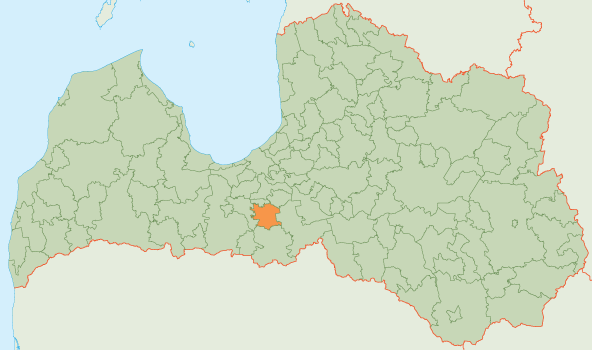
- Country: Latvia
- Formed: 2003
- Dissolved: 2021
- Centre: Iecava

Government
  - Council Chair: Aivars Mačeks (NA)

Area
  - Total: 312.09 km^{2} (120.50 sq mi)
  - Land: 306 km^{2} (118 sq mi)
  - Water: 6.09 km^{2} (2.35 sq mi)

Population (2021)
  - Total: 8,411
  - Density: 27.5/km^{2} (71.2/sq mi)
- Website: www.iecava.lv

Iecava Municipality (Latvian: Iecavas novads) is a former municipality in the historical region of Semigallia, and the Zemgale Planning Region in Latvia. The municipality was formed 2003 by a reorganization of Iecava Parish. The administrative centre was Iecava. The municipality consisted of the following settlements: Audrupi, Dimzukalns, Dzelzāmurs, Dzimtmisa, Iecava, Rosme, Vanči, Zālīte, Ziemeļi, Zorģi. The population in 2020 was 8,353.

On 1 July 2021, Iecava Municipality ceased to exist and its territory was merged with Bauska Municipality as Iecava Parish.

== History ==
Iecava was first mentioned in 1492, when the Master of the Livonian Order, Johann Freytag von Loringhoven, issued a document regarding the duties of peasants from Iecava and Mežotne regarding the local estate.

There is earlier proof of inhabitants of Semigallia settling the area. Today, in the center of Iecava, there was a camp, in which there have been found many items even from the Stone Age such as war hammers and work hammers. Two early tombs of the Iron Age were also explored.

In the 14th century Iecava was subordinated into the Livonian Order. From mid 16th century to end of 18th century the town was part of the Duchy of Courland. In 1567, with the order of the Duke of Courland, a separate Iecava-Lambarte congregation was founded, for which the Lutheran Church began to be built in 1641. During the Duchy of Courland in 1652.-1845. Iecava became a local industrial center with copper, tar, lime, brick and coal kilns, dolomite quarries, paper mills, flax and monochrome weave weaver, and stud workshops. Cannons (two of them are displayed in the center of Iecava), cannon balls, ship nails, and boilers were produced.

After adding Courland to Russian Empire, Iecava became a crown manor. In 1795, the estate was acquired by Count Peter von der Paul, to whom the Russian Empress Catherine II donated the previously rented Lieliecava manor, and came to Paul's "eternal ownership". Count Paul's reign brought Iecava a lively boom - at the end of the 18th century Iecava castle was built, 1795-1890. created an English-style landscape park of 17.2 hectares with a large variety of native tree species and exotic species.

During the Napoleon's invasion of Russia in 1812, significant fights took place in Iecava. During the French invasion, Colonel de Tolly, the brother of the famous Russian officer Michael Barclay de Tolly, died here. Legends say that several bullets fired during the campaign have left marks still visible on the walls of Iecava Church. On July 7, 1812, the Battle of Iecava took place, where the French army, led by generals von Grawert and Kleist von Nollendorf, defeated Russian troops.

In the 19th century there were 16 manors in the territory of Iecava (Branti, Briede, Grienvalde, Misa, Zorģe manor, etc.). In 1827 the Dzimtmisa School was opened, 1858. - the Iecava School, 1864. - the Misa School. At the end of the 19th century, the rapid development of capitalism and the geographical position of Iecava contributed to the development of the village and its administrative center. In 1869 a parish house was built, in 1876 - the school of Iecava parish. In 1885, a pharmacy was opened in Iecava, which is still in operation in this building. In 1891, the new Peace Court building, including customs, police, post office (now houses a cultural house), was completed. During this time, too, Craftsmen's House (now - post office).

During the first world war, two years in the vicinity of the frontline, Iecava was hit hard. Iecava Palace was destroyed in 1915 with the deportation of the Russian army from Riga. From the palace complex, the library housing of the Earl Leonid von der Pahlen, the horse stables, and the three park guards' houses have remained.

Although Iecava suffered greatly during the First World War - there were only 43 homes with 139 inhabitants in the 1920s - it quickly recovered due to convenient traffic and fertile soils.

At the time of the first Republic of Latvia, 17 000 ha of the land of the Lieliecava Manor was divided into new holdings, while the manor was converted into a village with 400 building blocks. In 1935, there were 709 residents in the village. In the second half of the 1930s, Iecava had two schools, three libraries, a hospital, many commercial and industrial companies, and several associations.

On 23 August 1936, the Freedom Monument was built in Iecava Park. The monument was carved from Latvian granite by artist Pēteris Banders.

== Soviet occupation ==
The end of the first year of the Soviet occupation of Latvia (1940–41) is dramatic for Latvia as a whole and also for Iecava - a large part of the population of the parish was deported. The second wave of deportations over Iecava came in 1949. Only a portion of the deported returns. On June 14, 1990, at Iecava station, the sculptor Mārtiņš Zaurs designed monument was discovered to the victims of Stalinist repression, “The pain semaphore.”

The years of Soviet occupation are marked by forced collectivization. After World War II, more than 10 kolkhozes were established in Iecava territory, combined in the 1970s in the “Iecava” kolhoz (a/s “Rakmente”, etc., founded in the early 1990s), p/s “Progress” (several companies were created in the early 1990s, including co-operative societies “Ikstrums” and “Rosme”, SIA, Iecava) and p/s Zālīte

In 1958, by decree of the Supreme Council of the Latvian SSR, the heavily populated area “Iecava” is transformed into a working village. There are 1242 residents in the village this time around.

By the end of the 1950s, the food industry began to grow in Iecava. A distillery was reconstructed in 1957, a dairy combined in 1962, a bakery was built in 1961. In 1968, a combined feed plant started production, in 1973 the Iecava Poultry Factory was created (now a/s “Balticovo”, the largest producer of eggs in the Baltics).

On 1 February 1963, the village of Iecava workers was transformed into a city village.

In the 1980s, a strong agrarian complex base has developed in Iecava's urban village and its surroundings. The Iecava station contains an intermediate-Republican fertilizer base, a combined forage plant, and an asphalt-concrete plant. The area comprises an Iecava bird factory, a distillery, a dairy and other businesses. Large agricultural production companies were here. The overall atmosphere was affected by the former presence of three parts of the USSR rocket bases.

== After independence ==
In the early 1990s, with the recovery of Latvia's independence and rapid changes in economic life, Iecava and its surroundings also changed. Some of the Soviet troops were leaving and there was a change in the legal status of many companies in the area.

In 1990, the Council of Members of the People of Iecava chose in favour of the parish when examining the question of changing the status of the village.

On 12 August 2003, the deputies of Iecava parish council unanimously decided to establish the municipality of Iecava within the administrative territorial borders of the civil parish of Iecava and, on the basis of regulation 708, adopted by the Cabinet on 16.12.2003, “Provisions on the establishment of the municipality of Iecava of the Bauska district”, thus Iecava Parish became the Iecava Municipality (1 January 2004).

== See also ==
- Administrative divisions of Latvia
- Tourism portal for Iecava
- Iecava municipality site
