= Dzimtmisa Manor =

Manor house in Latvia

- Semigallia, Latvia
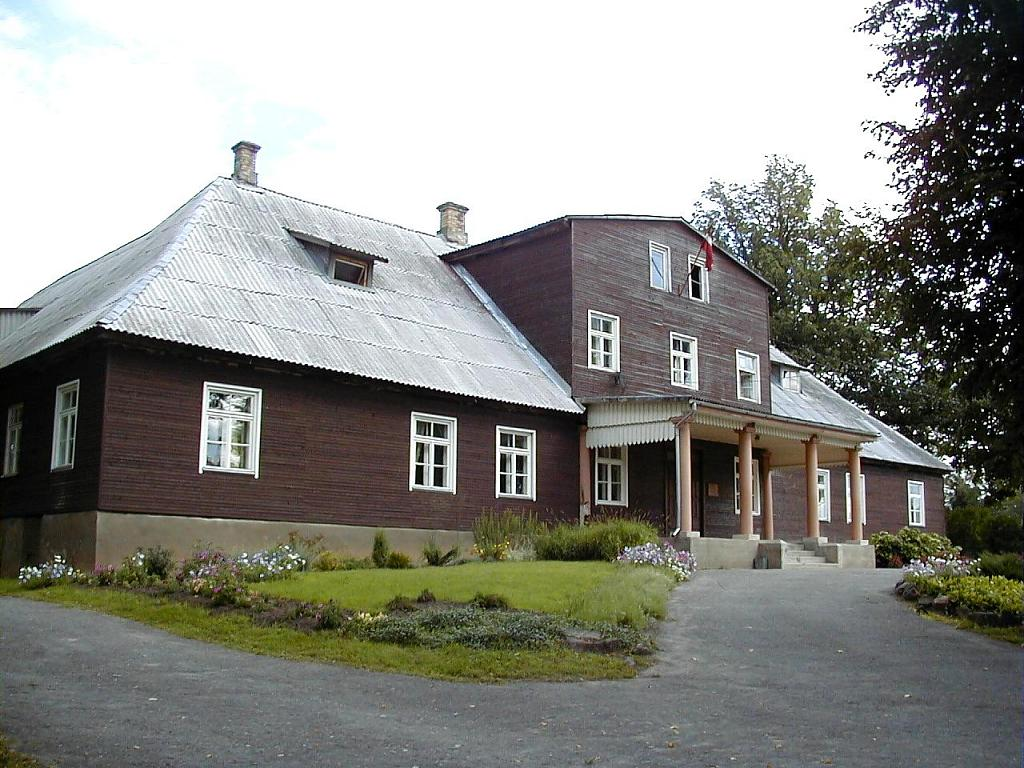

Site information
- Type: Manor

Location
- Coordinates: 56°40′55.06″N 24°14′46.16″E

Dzimtmisa Manor (Latvian: Dzimtmisas muiža) is a manor in Dzimtmisa, in the Iecava Parish of Bauska Municipality in the Semigallia region of Latvia.

== History ==
Estate known as Misa manor was built in 1560, it first owner was Lukas Wolf. Manor was located in the very center of Puttelene, now between Iecava and Baldoni, 35 km from Riga-Bauska highway. Later Manor was renamed Dzimtmisa Manor. Later Manor belonged to Johann Treyden. The last owner of the manor was Edmund von Reichard and his wife. The manor house was built in the 19th century, then rebuilt several times. Structurally manor is a log house with plank cladding.

== See also ==
- List of palaces and manor houses in Latvia
