= Motus O dance theatre =

Canadian contemporary dance company

Motus O dance theatre is a Canadian contemporary dance company based in Stouffville, Ontario that began performing in 1990. They draw upon dance, street theatre, mime, slapstick, spoken word and video in their mission to create diverse and accessible works for all audiences. Motus O has created 28 full-length productions.

== History ==
Motus O dance theatre began performing in September 1990 as a collective including Cynthia Croker, Jack Langenhuizen, James Croker, Beth Newell, Gary Kirkham and Natalie Radford. After performing collections of short pieces at arts festivals in Toronto they performed their first full-length show, Human Knots, on November 14, 1992 at the Markham Theatre in Ontario, Canada.

The name Motus O is a pun derived from the Latin phrase "modus operandi" (method of operating) and the Latin word "motus" (movement). Hence the "moving way of doing things."

Newell, Radford and Kirkham went on to pursue other interests. Natalie Radford becoming a movie and television actress and Gary Kirkham becoming a stage actor and playwright. Beth Newell became a counselling therapist, in part, specializing in expressive arts therapy.

Subsequently, Motus O was registered as a not-for-profit charitable company with James Croker, Cynthia Croker and Jack Langenhuizen as co-artistic Directors, choreographers and performers, roles that they continued until their retirement in 2024. Motus O has engaged a Company of additional performers throughout its existence as well as collaborating with writers, playwrights, musicians, composers, videographers and other artists.

Cynthia, Jack and James all taught at the former Academy of Performing Arts School in Cambridge, Ontario and whilst there toured internationally with a number of productions. They had arrived at the Academy from different backgrounds and eclectic performance disciplines.

Cynthia Croker grew up in Minneapolis, Minnesota and studied dance, as well as training in voice, flute and gymnastics including a vocal program at Concordia College, Minnesota. On top of her other roles at Motus O she also serves as costume designer. Jack Langenhuizen, who grew up in Uxbridge, Ontario was a national figure skater who later studied and taught dance including modern and contact improvisation. In addition to his other roles he is the general manager of Motus O. James Croker was raised on an Australian sheep station and was initially attracted to mime, street performance and theatre. In addition to his other roles at Motus O he has prime responsibility for set design and props.

== Style ==
Motus O's multidisciplinary approach has meant that some arts critics have struggled to categorize their works. One reviewer noting “as a dance company, it is better known in the theatre world…” and asking rhetorically “is what they do dance or theatrical movement?” Their works have been described as “lavish and multidimensional; visual feasts of wild costumes, props, video and lighting… dance served up with the production values and character studies of theatre."

Perhaps because of their willingness to combine disciplines they have also been described as “imaginative”, "innovative" "inventive" and "always adventurous". The Artistic Directors of Motus O state that the clear communication of ideas is a primary aim with many of their works being “narrative driven” productions.

Motus O's unashamed focus on performances that attract both dance enthusiasts and more general audiences and their effort at clear communication have been appreciated by many critics, one for example describing Motus O as “lending enormous physical energy to its bid to make modern dance comprehensible”. This same attribute has been less enthusiastically received by some dance critics with one for example opining that their background as street performers results in a “tendency to stress the obvious.”

Many critics have commented upon the athleticism and physicality of Motus O's work. For example, describing the work as “high energy…[and]..physically risky” and “lithe and gymnastic”. Another critic referring to their “eye-bending, unpredictable physicality.”

The troupe lists contact improvisation amongst its dance influences. One critic has described Motus O as “taking a cue from American dance guru Moses Pendleton.” Pendleton co-founded dance companies Pilobolus and MOMIX.

Motus O incorporate comic elements in their work, as well as notable amounts of humor.

The imaginative use of props and costumes has been described as a consistent feature of Motus O's work.

== Collaborations ==
=== Writers, playwrights and dramatists ===
As self described creators of “narrative driven” works Motus O has often collaborated with authors, playwrights and dramatists. Simon Johnston, playwright and author, conceived Motus O's production of Alice, based on Lewis Carroll's Alice in Wonderland and Through the Looking Glass and worked with the company to bring it to fruition. The production premiered at the Lighthouse Festival Theatre in Port Dover, Ontario in 1994.

The author, poet and playwright Patrick Friesen wrote The Shunning, on which Motus O's 1995 production of the same name was based. The production premiered at the Tarragon Theatre, Toronto in October 2005.

In 2014 Motus O collaborated with Marina Nemat, human rights activist and author of the bestselling memoir The Prisoner of Tehran in creating a production based on the book. Marina was imprisoned and tortured in her native Iran following the 1979 Islamic Revolution. She emigrated to Canada in 1991. Motus O's approach was “not to dance her story, but to use movement to illustrate her story telling” and “to support Marina's story through movement and not 'hijack' it”. The work has been described as “a moving, surprisingly funny and intensely invigorating piece of theatre that allows her [Nemat] to tell her story to audiences.”

Prisoner of Tehran was performed at the Canadian Museum for Human Rights in Winnipeg in 2016 as part of a national tour.

Johnny Wideman, playwright and actor, wrote the script for A Fair Tale – The Long/Short History of Fairs, which premiered at Markham Fairground, Markham, Ontario on October 2, 2014.

=== Musicians, other artists and musical organizations ===
The Royal Conservatory of Music commissioned Motus O to create and adapt Petrouchka for a special production for elementary school aged children in 2002. and Carmina Burana for Carl Orff Canada in 2006. The commissions arose from Motus O's collaboration with Executive Director Angela Elster and the Conservatory's Learning Through the Arts (LTTA) program.

The Hannaford Street Silver Band commissioned Motus O to create Circus Terrifico in 2009 The premiere performance was conducted by David Briskin, National Ballet of Canada music director.

Peter Jarvis and Paul Tedeschini of Spinfinity were commissioned by Motus O dance theatre to create original music for A Midsummer Night's Dream.

Vincent Cheng, assistant conductor at the Greater Toronto Philharmonic orchestra was commissioned to compose music for Momentum-Perspectives II.

An-Lun Huang was commissioned to compose music for What the Heck-Perspectives III 2011 and Little Match Girl Revisited 2012.

The videographer Jeff Young created a series of works for Motus O's 2017 production Moving Stories.

== List of full-length works ==
1992 - Human Knots	2011 - What the Heck? – Perspectives III
1994 - Alice	2012 - The Little Match Girl Revisited
1995 -The Shunning	2014 - Prisoner of Tehran
1997- Delusions	2014 - A Fair Tale – The Long/Short History of Fairs
2000- The Little Prince	2015 - Chasing the Dream
2002 - Petrouchka	2015 - Animal Tales
2003 -A MidSummer Night's Dream	2015 - The Best of Motus O 25th Anniversary Show
2005- Variations in Love	2016 - From Hand to Plough
2005 - East of the Sun West of the Moon	2016 - One Hit Wonders
2006- Carmina Burana	2017 - Moving Stories: Strokes of Insight, Acts of Genius
2007 - A Christmas Carol	2017 - From Fair & Wide, O Canada
2009 - Circus Terrifico	2020 - Confessions of a Professional Dancer
2009 - Perspectives	2020 - 30th Anniversary Show
2010 - Perspectives II - 20thAnniversary	2021 - 30th + 1 Anniversary Show

== Past and present performers ==
Lara Bernstein (Wirick), Petra Blenkhorne, Trevor Copp, Nikolas Croker, Kate Cunningham, Laura Day-Sobolev, Lisa Emmons, Rob Faust, Sarah Felschow, Chelsea Ferrando, Stephen Filipowitcz, Andrew Hartley, Tracy Houser, Jen Johnson, Melissa Spence, Lisa King, Kate Knox, Jonathan Lawley, Diana Lopez-Soto, Katie Major Austin, Mariana Mangevil Alvarez, Blake Martin, Hiroshi Miyamoto, Jonathon Neville, Beth Newell, Keiko Ninomiya, Malgorzata Nowacka, Blaise Pascal, Natalie Radford, Deborah Radbourne, Emily Redford, Kriena Ryan, Lisa Sandlos, Jesse Scharo, Joel Seaman, Mark Segal, Lincoln Shand, Sarah Silverman, Tim Spronk, Dahlia Steinberg, Laurel Thody, John Turco, Tom Vogel, Johnny Wideman, Daniella Zappala

== Education and training ==
=== Workshops ===
Motus O offers general workshops in dramatic dance, contact improvisation and dance technique, as well as corporate workshops, which use the creative process to develop leadership and team skills. Motus O and its Co-Artistic Directors have taught leadership programs at the Banff Centre for Arts and Creativity in Alberta, Canada where they worked with other leadership trainers such as Diana Theodores and Colin Funk and author and speaker John Baldoni who was inspired to write about Motus O in an article in Forbes magazine.

The company also creates customized movement workshops for individuals with physical limitations including those affected by stroke, Parkinson's disease and cerebral palsy, as well as older people with limited mobility. Their experiences working with people affected by aphasia inspired some of the pieces in Moving Stories:Strokes of Insight, Acts of Genius and they were joined on stage by workshop members as well as by members of the autism/neuro-diverse community.

In addition, they offer special workshops for both hospice caregivers and their clients using techniques such as dance, music and story telling.

=== Education ===
Motus O has been working with teachers and students of all ages across North America for more than 30 years, performing shows, hosting theatre and drama workshops and training educators. The company also offers theatre camps for students aged from 5 to 17.

== Awards ==
1998 - International Fringe Festival, Orlando, Florida U.S.A. -People's Choice Award - BEST ACTOR – James Croker; People's Choice Award - BEST ACTRESS – Cynthia Croker; People's Choice Award - BEST PRODUCTION – “Alice”.

2003 - Contact East (Canada) - Outstanding Touring Performers Award in Atlantic Canada

2005 - Prologue to the Performing Arts PAULA AWARD for youth programming- Toronto, Canada

2007 - Toronto Star Critics’ Choice Award (Susan Walker, Toronto Star, 2007) - Most highly recommended work to see at the Luminato Festival 2007, Toronto, Canada

2010 - Ontario Presents Artists of the Year Award

2016 - March of Dimes Community Partnership Award

2016 - British Columbia Touring Council Artistic Company of the Year Award

2023 - Markham Performing Arts Award - Professional Artist of the Year
