= Dimzukalns =

Village in Latvia

- Village
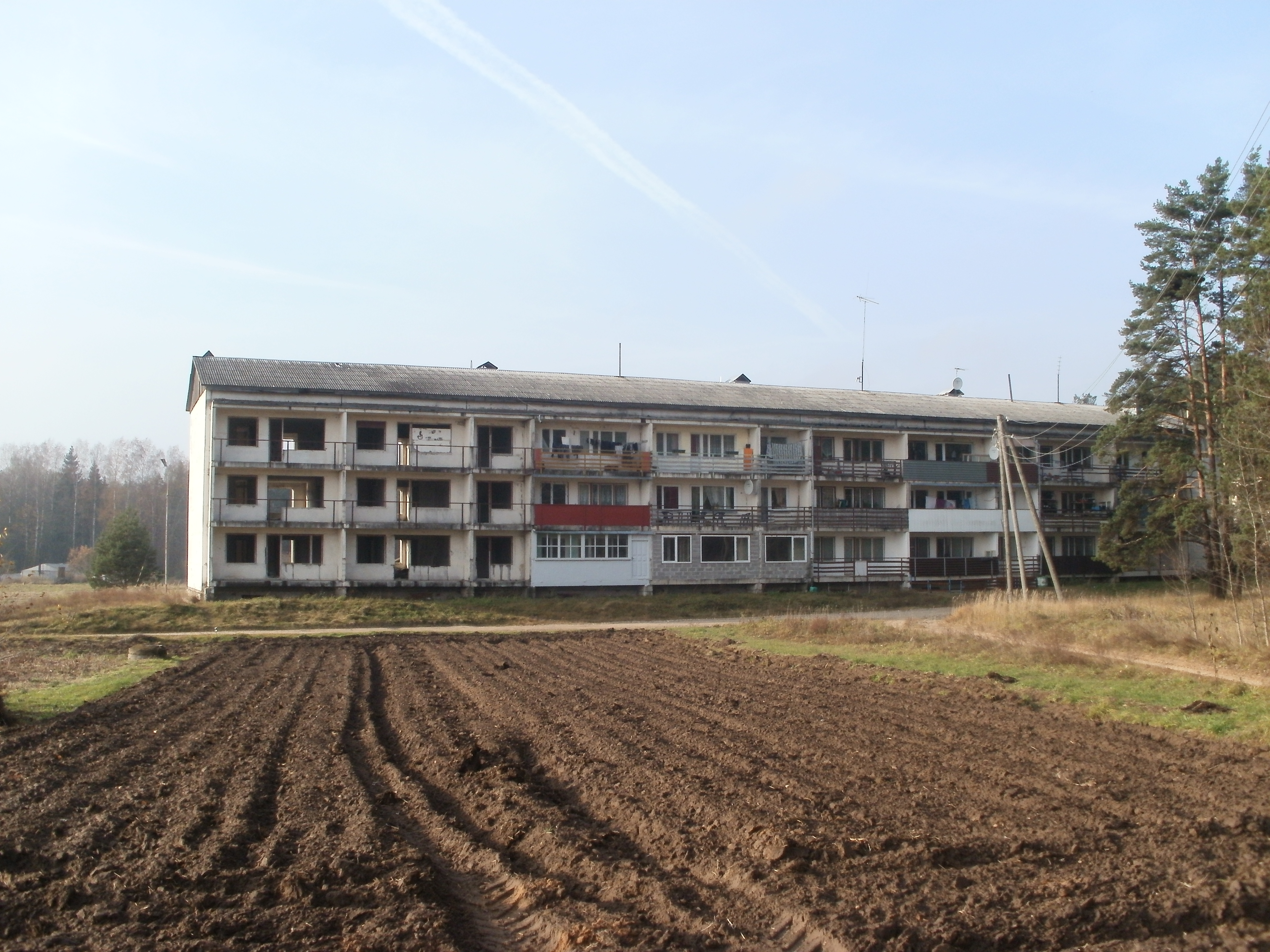
- Apartment building in Dimzukalns

- Location within Latvia
- Coordinates: 56°39′44″N 24°14′19″E
- Country: Latvia
- Municipality: Bauska Municipality
- Parish: Iecava Parish

Area
  - Total: 1 km^{2} (0.39 sq mi)
- Elevation: 22 m (72 ft)

Population (2021)
  - Total: 245
- ZIP Code: LV-3913 Iecava

Dimzukalns is a village in the Iecava Parish of Bauska Municipality in the Semigallia region of Latvia. It is located in the northern part of the parish on the right bank of Jāņupe near the A7 highway, 8 km from the parish center Iecava, 30.5 km from the county center Bauska and 38 km from Riga.

The settlement was established in the post-war years as a village of the kolkhoz "Iecava". Dimzukalns is home to the graves of the World War 2 brothers. Top Radio broadcasts from the tower here.

== Population ==
Within existing borders, using CSP and OSP data.

Historic population count in Dimzukalns

Year	Pop.	±%
1970	39	—
1979	143	+266.7%

Year	Pop.	±%
1989	240	+67.8%
2000	286	+19.2%

Year	Pop.	±%
2011	290	+1.4%
2021	245	−15.5%
