= Zorģi =

Village in Latvia

Zorģi Sudmalis
- Village
- Location within Latvia
- Coordinates: 56°33′52″N 24°10′3″E
- Country: Latvia
- Municipality: Bauska Municipality
- Parish: Iecava Parish

Area
  - Total: 1.59 km^{2} (0.61 sq mi)
- Elevation: 25 m (82 ft)

Population (2021)
  - Total: 196
- ZIP Code: LV-3913

Zorģi (IPA: [zɔrɟi]; formerly Sudmalis) is a village in the Iecava Parish of Bauska Municipality in the Semigallia region of Latvia. It is located in the southern part of the parish by the A7 highway, 4.4 km from the parish center Iecava, 18.8 km from the county center Bauskas and 49 km from Riga.

The village was formed near the former estates of Zorģi (Klein-Sorgen; in the northern part of the village) and Jurģi (Georgenhof; in the southwestern part). It grew up during the Soviet years as a village of the Imants Sudmalis Kolkhoz farm. From 1949 to 1954, the center of the Zaļumi village council. There is also a library in Zorģi.

== Population ==
Within existing borders, after CSP and OSP data.

Historical population count

Year	Pop.	±%
1970	55	—
1979	149	+170.9%

Year	Pop.	±%
1989	140	−6.0%
2000	220	+57.1%

Year	Pop.	±%
2011	195	−11.4%
2021	196	+0.5%
