= Īkstrums =

River in Semigallia, Latvia

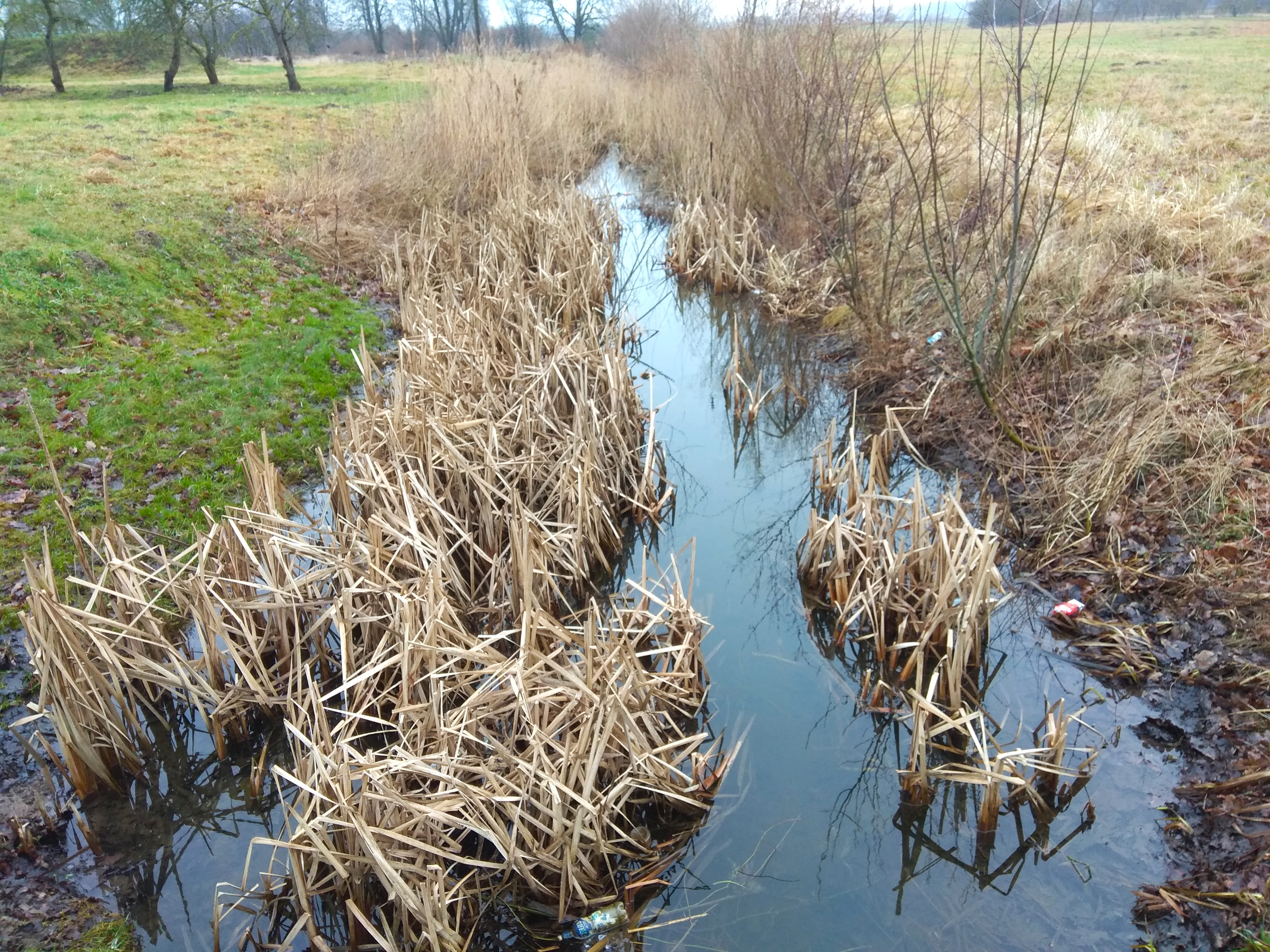
- Īkstrums in Code

- Location within Latvia

Location
- Country: Latvia

Physical characteristics
- Source: near Code, Bauska Municipality
  - coordinates: 56°26′28″N 24°13′17″E
- Mouth: Iecava, Bauska Municipality
  - coordinates: 56°39′19″N 24°05′04″E
- Length: 23 km (14 mi)

The Īkstrums, also Ikstrums, is a river in Semigallia, Latvia. It flows through the parishes of Bauska, Code, Mežotne and Iecava, where it flows into the River Iecava as a left-bank tributary. It begins southwest of Code as the former headwaters of the Garoze River. In length it is 23 or 28 km.

The mouth of the river in Iecava Parish is located near Zālīte. It runs first eastward to Garoze, then turns north. In a large part of the Īkstrum's course, the bed is regulated. The basin is formed mainly by county ditches. The most notable settlements on its banks are Code, Bērzmuiža, Zālīte.

== Tributaries ==
=== Right bank ===
- Dolīte

== Literature ==
The Īkstrums has been mentioned in Edvards Virza's works.
