= Vanči =

- Hamlet
- Location within Latvia
- Coordinates: 56°37′29″N 24°8′32″E

Area
  - Land: 0.05 km^{2} (0.019 sq mi)
- Elevation: 17 m (56 ft)

Population (2003)
  - Total: 22
- ZIP Code: LV-3913

Vanči is a hamlet in Iecava Parish of Bauska Municipality in the Semigallia region of Latvia. It is located in the middle of the parish on the left bank of Iecava river, 6.6 km from the center of the parish Iecava, 27 km from the municipality center Bauska and 50 km from Riga.
