= Zālīte =

Village in Latvia

Zālīte Brante
- Village
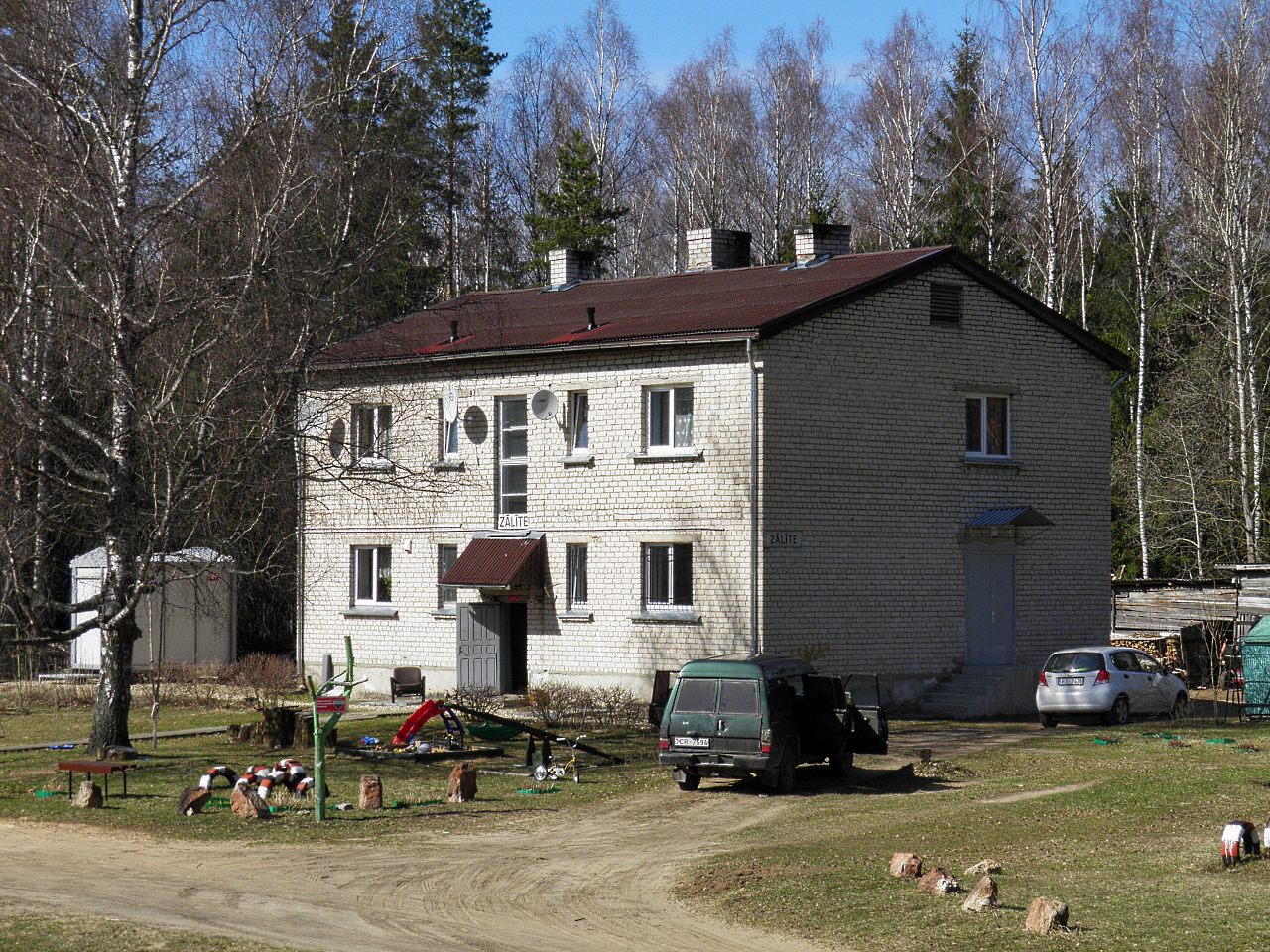
- Building in Zālīte Station

- Location within Latvia
- Coordinates: 56°36′59″N 24°4′55″E
- Country: Latvia
- Municipality: Bauska Municipality
- Parish: Iecava Parish

Area
  - Total: 1.3 km^{2} (0.50 sq mi)
- Elevation: 10 m (33 ft)

Population (2021)
  - Total: 307
- ZIP Code: LV-3913

Zālīte (formerly Brante) is a village in the Iecava Parish of Bauska Municipality in the Semigallia region of Latvia. It is located in the west of the parish at the inlet of the Īkstruma in Iecava, 9.3 km from the parish center Iecava, 27.9 km from the municipality center Bauska and 54 km from Riga.

The settlement was formed near the center of the former Īkstrume (Brant: Ixtrumünde) manor. It grew up in the post-war years as a village of the Soviet farm "Zālīte". In Zālīte, there is a branch of Zālīte special boarding elementary school (the school itself is located in "Brīvini" 4.4 km from Zālīte), a library, several shops and businesses. Zālīte railway station is located 3.8 km to the north.

2.5 km south of Zālīte, behind the P93 highway, before the withdrawal of the Soviet Army, there was a USSR missile base (positions of the 1st division of the 307th missile regiment of the 29th missile division).

== Population ==
Within the existing borders, after CSP and OSP data.

Historical population changes

Year	Pop.	±%
1970	341	—
1979	325	−4.7%

Year	Pop.	±%
1989	378	+16.3%
2000	349	−7.7%

Year	Pop.	±%
2011	311	−10.9%
2021	307	−1.3%

== Notable people ==
Dace Akmentiņa (1858—1936), latvian actress, one of the first latvian theatre stars.
