= Putrupe =

River in Latvia

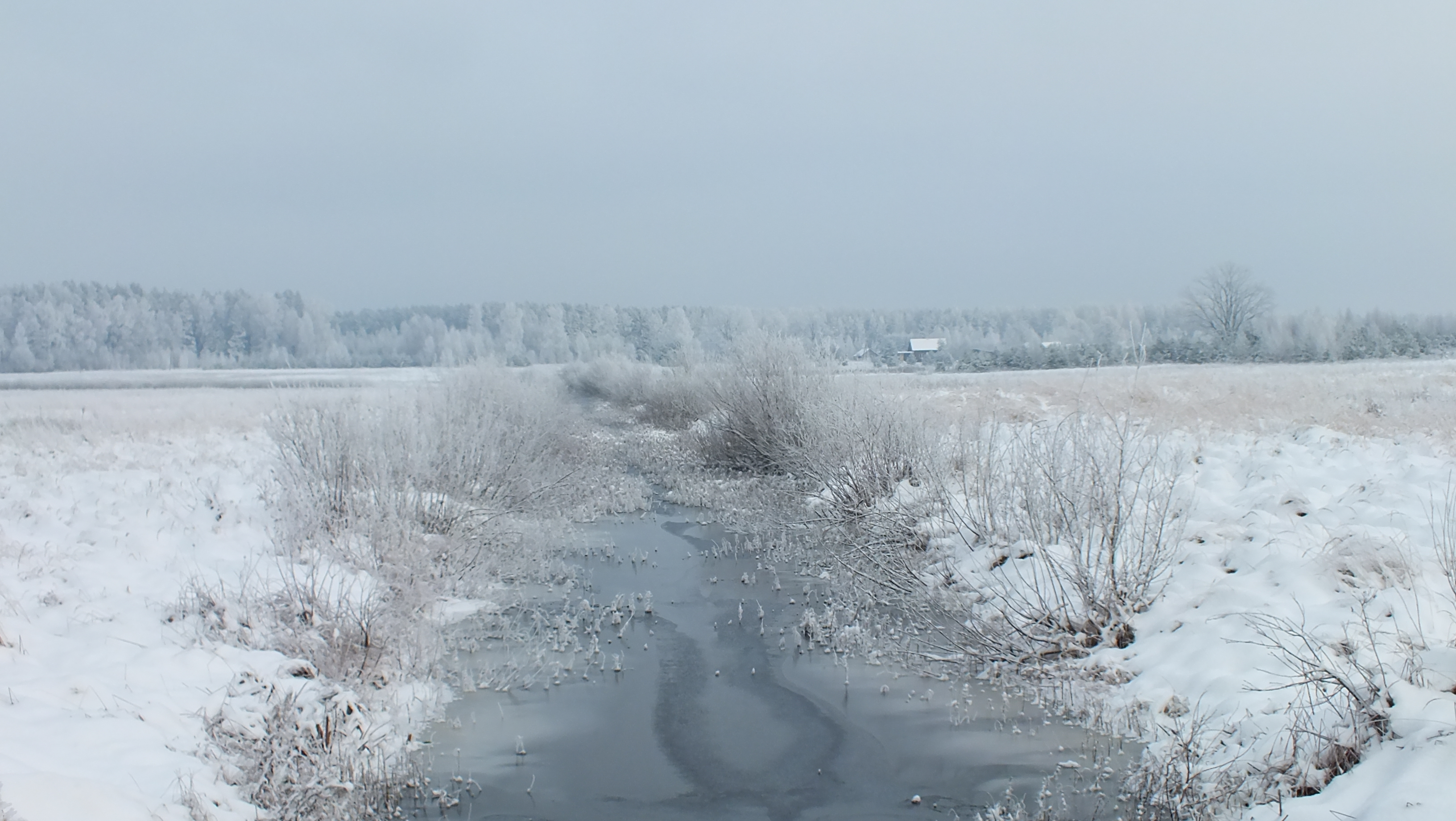
- River Putrupe near Ziemeļi

- Location of Putrupe in Latvia Location of Putrupe in the Baltic Sea basin

Location
- Country: Latvia
- Municipality: Bauska and Olaine

Physical characteristics
- Source
  - location: Near Dzimtmisa
  - coordinates: 56°40′59″N 24°15′27″E
- Mouth
  - location: Jāņupe
  - coordinates: 56°40′07″N 24°08′27″E
- Length: 12 km (7.5 mi)
- Basin size: 26.1 km^{2} (10.1 sq mi)

Putrupe is a right-bank tributary of the Jāņupe river in Bauska and Olaine municipalities in Latvia. It begins as a county ditch north of Dzimtmisa. It flows in a west–southwest direction, the riverbed is regulated along its entire length. It flows into the Jāņupe river near Klāvi. The river is crossed by the A7 highway. The largest settlement on its shores is Ziemeļi. And it is 12 kilometers long.
