= Ziemeļi =

Village in Semigallia region, Latvia

- Village
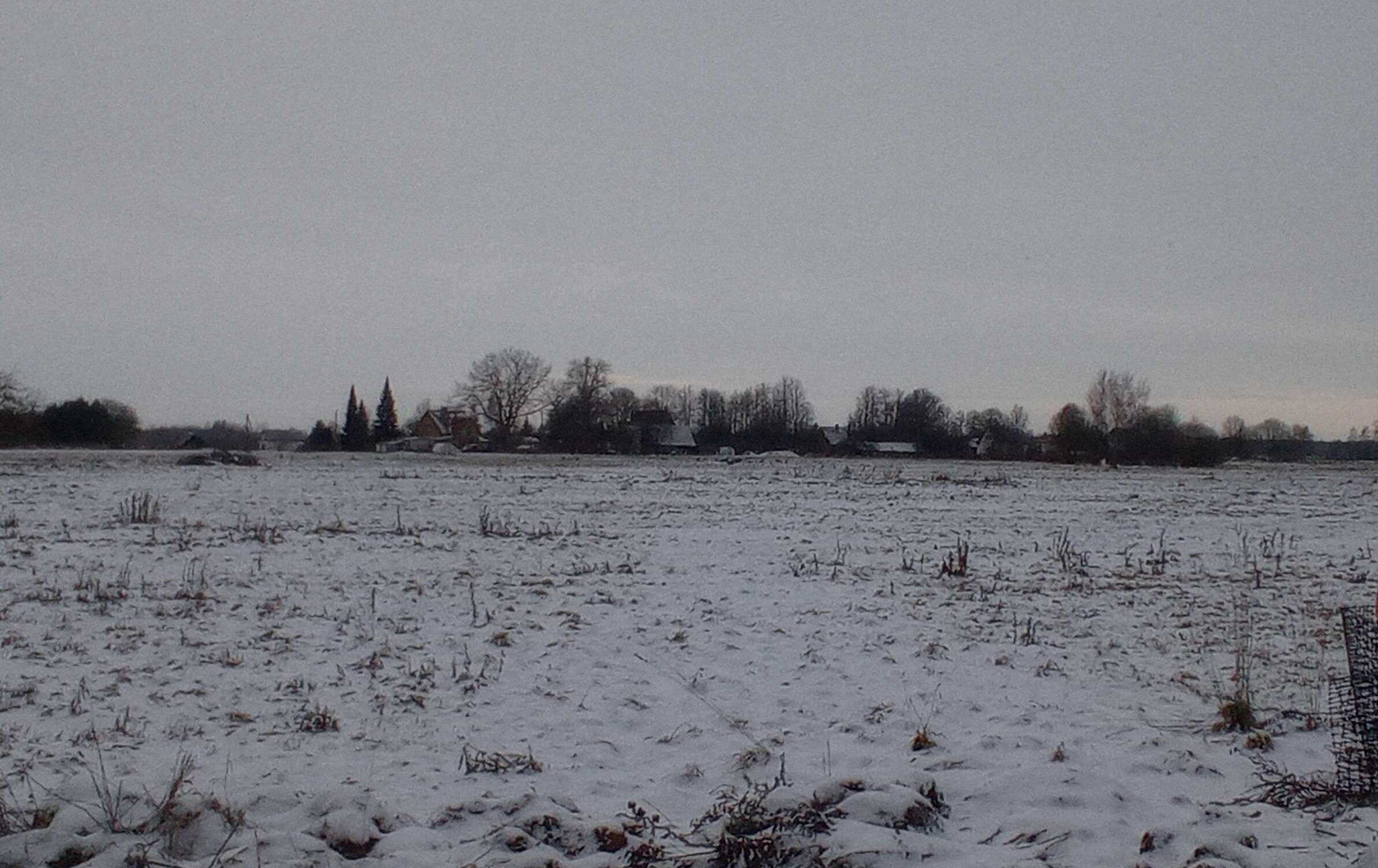
- Ziemeļi in the winter.

- Location within Latvia
- Coordinates: 56°40′56″N 24°12′59″E
- Country: Latvia
- Municipality: Bauska Municipality
- Parish: Iecava Parish
- Established: 1949
- Elevation: 16 m (52 ft)

Population (2025)
  - Total: 97
- ZIP Code: LV-3913

Ziemeļi (IPA: /ziemeʎi/;) is a small village located in Iecava Parish, Bauska Municipality, in the Semigallia region of Latvia. The village lies approximately 12 km northwest of the parish center, Iecava, 35 km north of Bauska, and 39 km south of Riga. It is part of a predominantly agricultural area and is characterized by its small population and rural setting.

== History ==
The history of Ziemeļi is closely tied to the development of Iecava Parish. While the region has been inhabited since ancient times, the village of Ziemeļi was established during the Soviet era, particularly in mid-20th century. At that time, agricultural collectivization led to the creation of collective farms (kolkhozes), which shaped the settlement patterns in the area. Historical farmsteads in the surrounding region included Buļļi, Kalnenieki, and Kriknas.

Prior to the Soviet period, the area formed part of the traditional Semigallian countryside, with scattered farmsteads and agricultural estates. Archaeological finds indicate that human activity in the broader Iecava area dates back to prehistoric times.

== Geography ==
Ziemeļi is situated on the shores of river Putrupe, in the northern part of Iecava Parish and is surrounded by farmland, forests, and small ditches. The village is part of the lowland terrain typical of the Semigallian region, with fertile soils that support local agriculture.

The nearest major city is Riga, Latvia's capital, located about 39 km to the north.

== Population ==
As of 2025, Ziemeļi had a population of 97 residents. The village is small, with limited residential development, and many residents are engaged in agriculture or commute to nearby towns for work. Population trends reflect rural depopulation common in smaller Latvian villages. Within existing borders, using OSP data.

Historical population

Year	Pop.	±%
2000	77	—
2011	99	+28.6%
2016	104	+5.1%
2017	104	+0.0%

Year	Pop.	±%
2018	105	+1.0%
2019	103	−1.9%
2020	106	+2.9%
2021	103	−2.8%

Year	Pop.	±%
2022	101	−1.9%
2023	105	+4.0%
2024	103	−1.9%
2025	97	−5.8%

== Infrastructure ==
The settlement is accessible from Riga via highway A7 (Rīga–Bauska–Lietuvas robeža), turning right near Dzimtmisa. Local roads also connect the village to Iecava and other nearby villages. There's no public transport within the village's borders, the closest bus stop used by public transport is on the A7 highway near Dzimtmisa. There is a bus stop inside Ziemeļi used by school buses. Most residents rely on Iecava for educational, medical, and commercial needs. The village's small size and rural character mean that infrastructure development is minimal.

A connection to the planned Iecava bypass motorway is being planned, and might be opened to traffic in 2030.
