= Marina Nemat =

Russian-Iranian-Canadian author

- Born: 22 April 1965 (age 61); Tehran, Iran

Marina Nemat (Persian: مارینا نِمت, Russian: Марина Немат; born 22 April 1965) is the author of two memoirs about her life growing up in Iran, serving time in Evin Prison for speaking out against the Iranian government, escaping a death sentence and fleeing Iran to go live in Canada.

== Life ==
Nemat's grandmothers were both Russian, and she was brought up in a Russian Orthodox Christian family in Tehran. Both her grandmothers had married Iranian men before the Russian Revolution of 1917, and all four of her grandparents fled from Russia to Iran as part of the wave of migration that started after the revolution. Her father worked as a dance teacher, her mother as a hairdresser. She was a high school student when the secularizing monarchy of Mohammad Reza Pahlavi was overthrown by Ayatollah Khomeini's Islamic Revolution. As a student Marina Nemat opposed the oppressive policies of the new Islamic government, attended demonstrations and wrote anti-revolutionary articles in a student newspaper.

On 15 January 1982, at age 16, Nemat was arrested and imprisoned for her views against the revolution. She was tortured in Evin Prison and sentenced to death. She was rescued by a prison guard, who also obtained commutation of her sentence to life imprisonment. However, after five months of imprisonment, it became clear that the guard had developed an attachment to Nemat and intended to force her to marry him. Nemat married the guard and was released from prison; he was later assassinated.

Nemat later married Andre Nemat. They escaped to Canada in 1991 and have two sons. Nemat worked at the Aurora franchise of the Swiss Chalet restaurant chain, and wrote her life story into the book Prisoner of Tehran.

Nemat sits on the board of directors of the Canadian Centre for Victims of Torture (CCVT) and Vigdis, a Norwegian charitable organization that provides assistance to female political prisoners around the world. In addition, she is the chair of the Writers in Exile Committee at PEN Canada, a member of the International Council of the Oslo Freedom Forum, and has been a volunteer at her church’s Refugee Committee since 2010.

== Literary career ==
Her book Prisoner of Tehran (2012) has been published in 28 countries and has been an international bestseller. In April 2012, a theatre adaptation of the book was staged at the Theatre Passe Muraille in Toronto under the direction of Maja Ardal. In 2014, Nemat collaborated with Motus O dance theatre to create a multi-disciplinary work based upon the memoir "that merges spoken word, dance and theatre." In November 2016 the production was performed at the Canadian Museum for Human Rights.

She was an Aurea Fellow at Massey College, Toronto, in 2008/2009, where she authored her second book, After Tehran: A Life Reclaimed, which was released in 2010.

She authored a third book, Mistress of the Persian Boarding House, a work of historical fiction inspired by the life of her paternal grandmother, released in July 2026.

She is a graduate of the certificate program in creative writing at the School of Continuing Studies at the University of Toronto, where she now teaches memoir writing part-time. She speaks about her experiences to high school classes, universities, and conferences. She is a regular participant in the Oslo Freedom Forum. In 2012 she was a guest speaker at the San Francisco Freedom Forum of the Human Rights Foundation.

== Bibliography ==
- Nemat, Marina (2008). Prisoner of Tehran. Free Press. ISBN 978-1-416-53743-4.
- Nemat, Marina (2010). After Tehran: A Life Reclaimed. Viking Canada. ISBN 978-0-670-06462-5.
- Doda, Christopher; Nemat, Marina, eds. (2017). The Best Canadian Essays 2017. Tightrope Books. ISBN 9781988040356.
- Nemat, Marina (2026). Mistress of the Persian Boarding House. Viking. ISBN 978-1-037-80331-4.

== Awards ==
Marina Nemat was awarded the first Human Dignity Prize in December 2007, given by the European Parliament. The Human Dignity Prize celebrates "those working toward a world free of intolerance and social injustice."

In 2014, she was awarded the Morris B. Abram Human Rights Award by UN Watch in Geneva.
