= Dzimtmisa =

Village in Iecava parish, Latvia

Dzimtmisa Mißhof (German) Misa
- Village
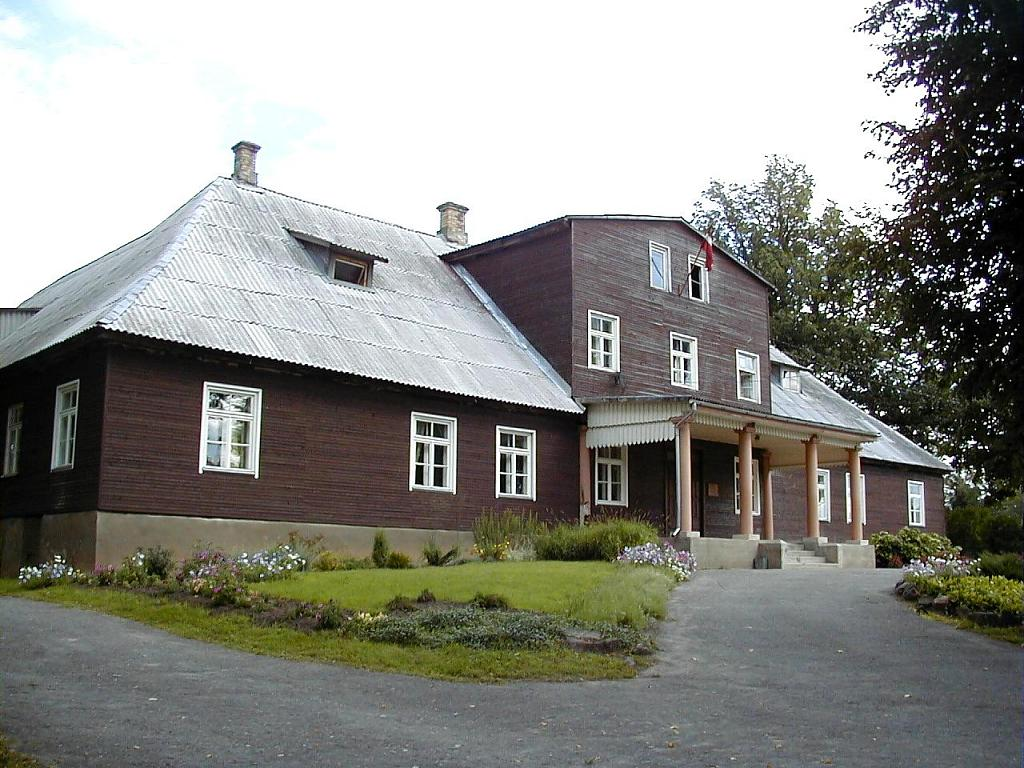
- Dzimtmisa (Misa) manor

- Location within Latvia
- Coordinates: 56°40′52″N 24°14′44″E
- Country: Latvia
- Municipality: Bauska Municipality
- Parish: Iecava Parish
- First mentioned: 1560

Area
  - Land: 0.86 km^{2} (0.33 sq mi)
- Elevation: 22 m (72 ft)

Population (2021)
  - Total: 49
  - Estimate (2024): 60
  - Density: 56.9/km^{2} (147/sq mi)
- ZIP Code: LV-3913

Dzimtmisa (formerly also Misa, Misas) is a settlement in the Iecava Parish of Bauska Municipality in the Semigallia region of Latvia. It is located in the north of the parish by the A7 highway, 10 km from the parish center Iecava, 32.5 km from the municipality center Bauska and 35 km from Riga.

The settlement was formed around the center of the former Misa (Dzimtmisa) manor (Misshof or Mißhof). The first Misa manor was built in 1560 on the site of Poutelene, the center of the ancient Semigallian river shore district, its owner was Lukas Wolff. Later, the manor belonged to Johann Trader. The last owner of the manor was Baron Reichold. The manor's house was built in the 19th century and rebuilt several times. In Dzimtmisa there used to be an elementary school, then there is the Ziemeļi Library, and a store. The private zoo "Dobuļi" is located 1 km from Dzimtmisa.

The first school in Dzimtmisa was founded in 1877, from 1920 in the manor building. From 1950 to 1997, it was called the Ziemeļi School.

== Population ==
In current borders, after CSP and OSP data.

Historical population
Year	Pop.	±%
2000	55	—
2011	61	+10.9%
2021	49	−19.7%

== Notable people ==
- Jānis Zakranovičs (1836—1908), Latvian Lutheran pastor, author of sermons, head of the Latvian Literary Society from 1895 to 1903.
