= A10 highway (Lithuania) =

Highway in Lithuania

A10
- Panevėžys-Pasvalys-Riga

Route information
- Part of E67
- Length: 66.10 km (41.07 mi)

Major junctions
- From: Panevėžys
- To: Škilinpamūšis; Latvia; E67 / A 7

Location
- Country: Lithuania
- Major cities: Pasvalys, Saločiai

Highway system
- Transport in Lithuania

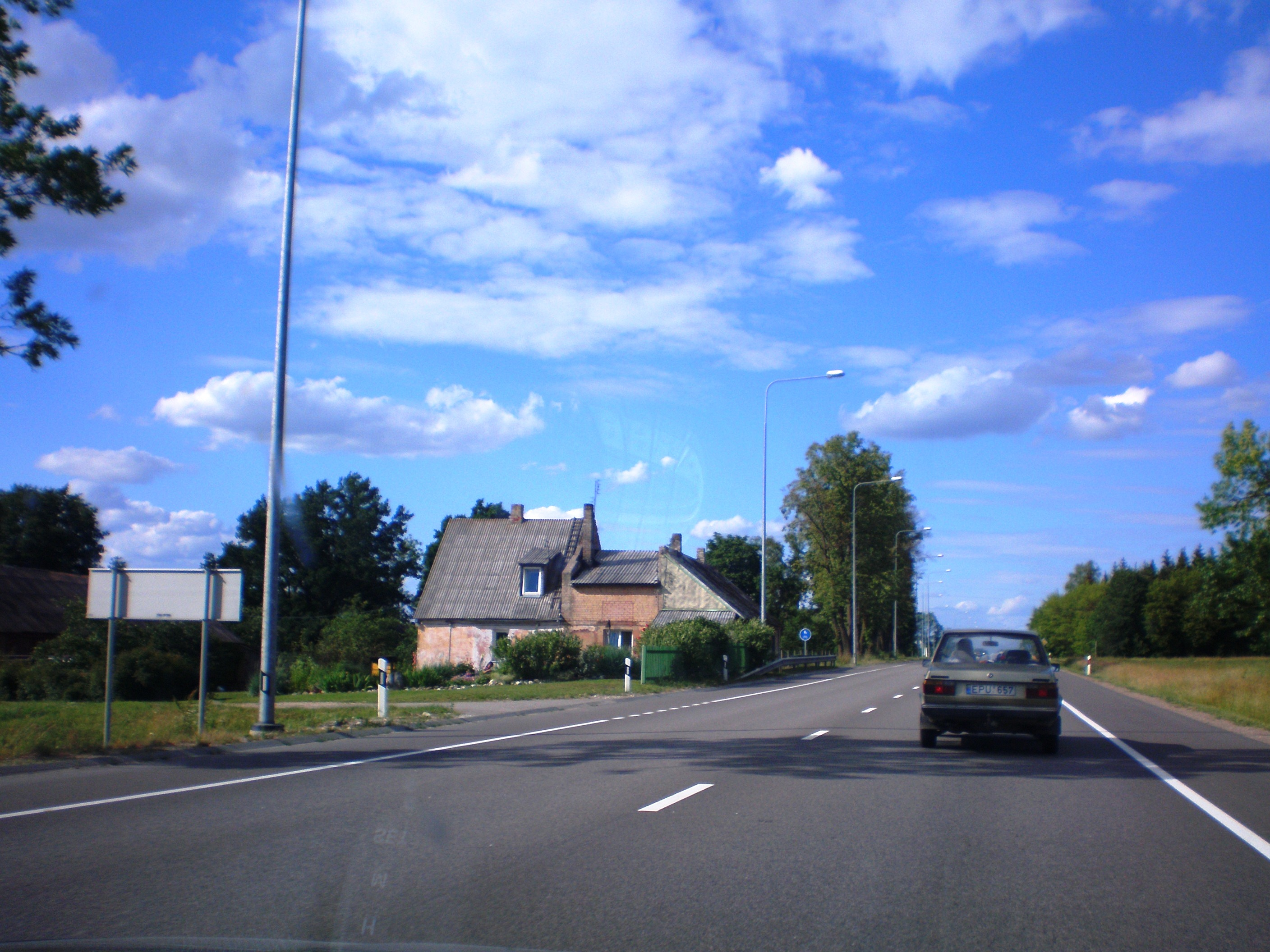
Highway near Pasvalys

The A10 highway is a highway in Lithuania (Magistralinis kelias). It runs from Panevėžys, bypassing Pasvalys and ends at the Latvian border. From there, the road continues to Riga. The length of the road is 66.10 km.

The speed limit for most of the road length is 90 km/h. It is a part of one of the most important transit roads in the Baltic states – the Via Baltica corridor. There are plans to convert the road to 2+1 road profile.
