= Ģedule =

River in Bauska Municipality, Latvia

Ģedule Ģedulis
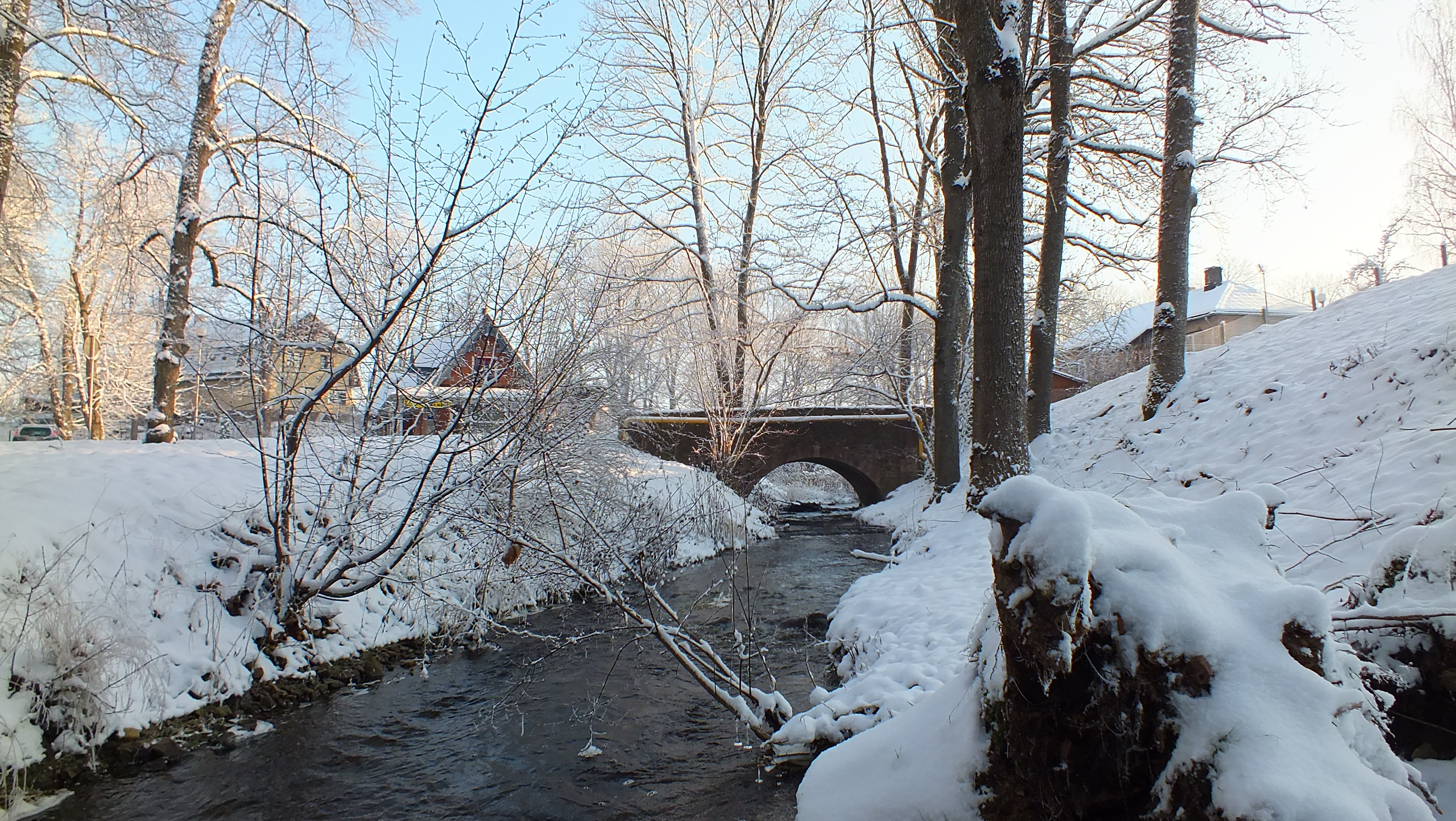
- Bridge over Ģedule in Iecava

- Location within Latvia

Location
- Municipality: Bauska Municipality
- Country: Latvia

Physical characteristics
- Source: Dreimaņi swamp
  - location: 56°30′16″N 24°14′00″E
- Mouth: Iecava
  - location: 56°35′34″N 24°11′46″E
- Length: 11 km (6.8 mi)
- Basin size: 30.5 km²

Basin features
- Cities: Iecava
- Bridges: Upes Iela, Iecava, Latvia

The Ģedule (also Ģedulis) is a tributary of the left bank of Iecava in Bauska Municipality. It begins as a district ditch on the western edge of Dreimaņi marsh, south of Tāma. It flows along the Semigallia plain mainly in the north direction, collecting the waters of the surrounding marshes. The river is regulated in most of its course, except for a small section before the mouth. It flows into the Iecava river in Iecava near Dartija.
