= Audrupi =

Village in Latvia

- Hamlet
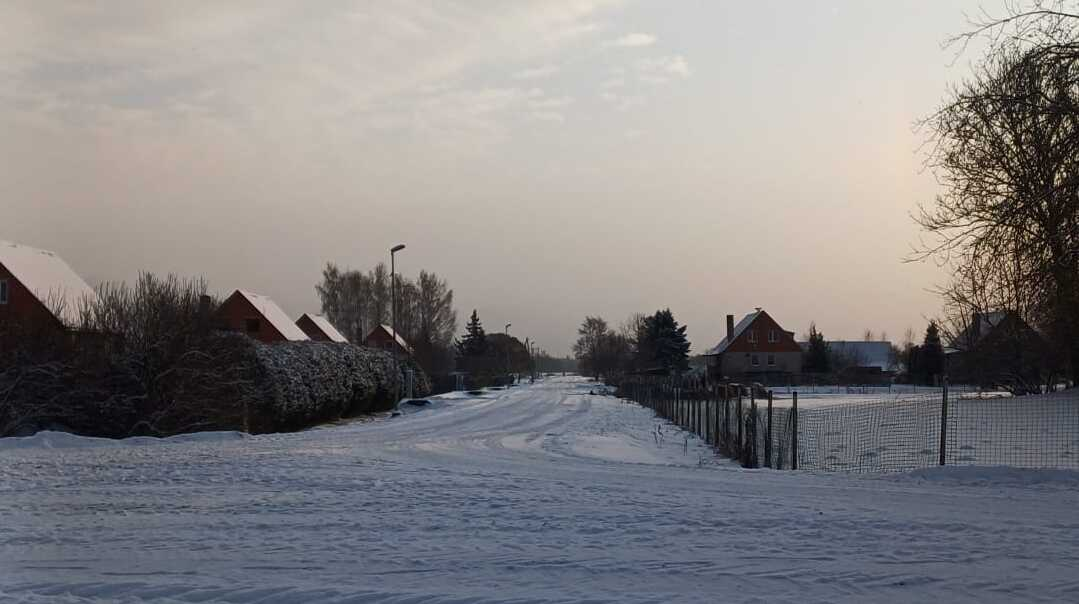

- Location within Latvia
- Coordinates: 56°34′27″N 24°14′53″E
- Country: Latvia
- Municipality: Bauska Municipality
- Parish: Iecava Parish

Area
  - Land: 0.46 km^{2} (0.18 sq mi)
- Elevation: 24 m (79 ft)

Population (2021)
  - Total: 94
- ZIP Code: LV-3913

Audrupi (formerly also Sosti) is a hamlet in Bauska Municipality, in the Semigallia region of Latvia.

It is located in the middle part of the Iecava parish, 4.6 km from the parish center Iecava, 23.9 km from the municipality center Bauska and 49 km from Riga.

The settlement was established in the post-war years as a village near a large dairy farm.

== Population ==
Within the existing limits, according to CSB and OSP data.

Historical population

Year	Pop.	±%
1989	120	—
2000	113	−5.8%

Year	Pop.	±%
2011	83	−26.5%
2021	94	+13.3%
