= Dzelzāmurs =

Village in Bauska Municipality, Latvia

- Village
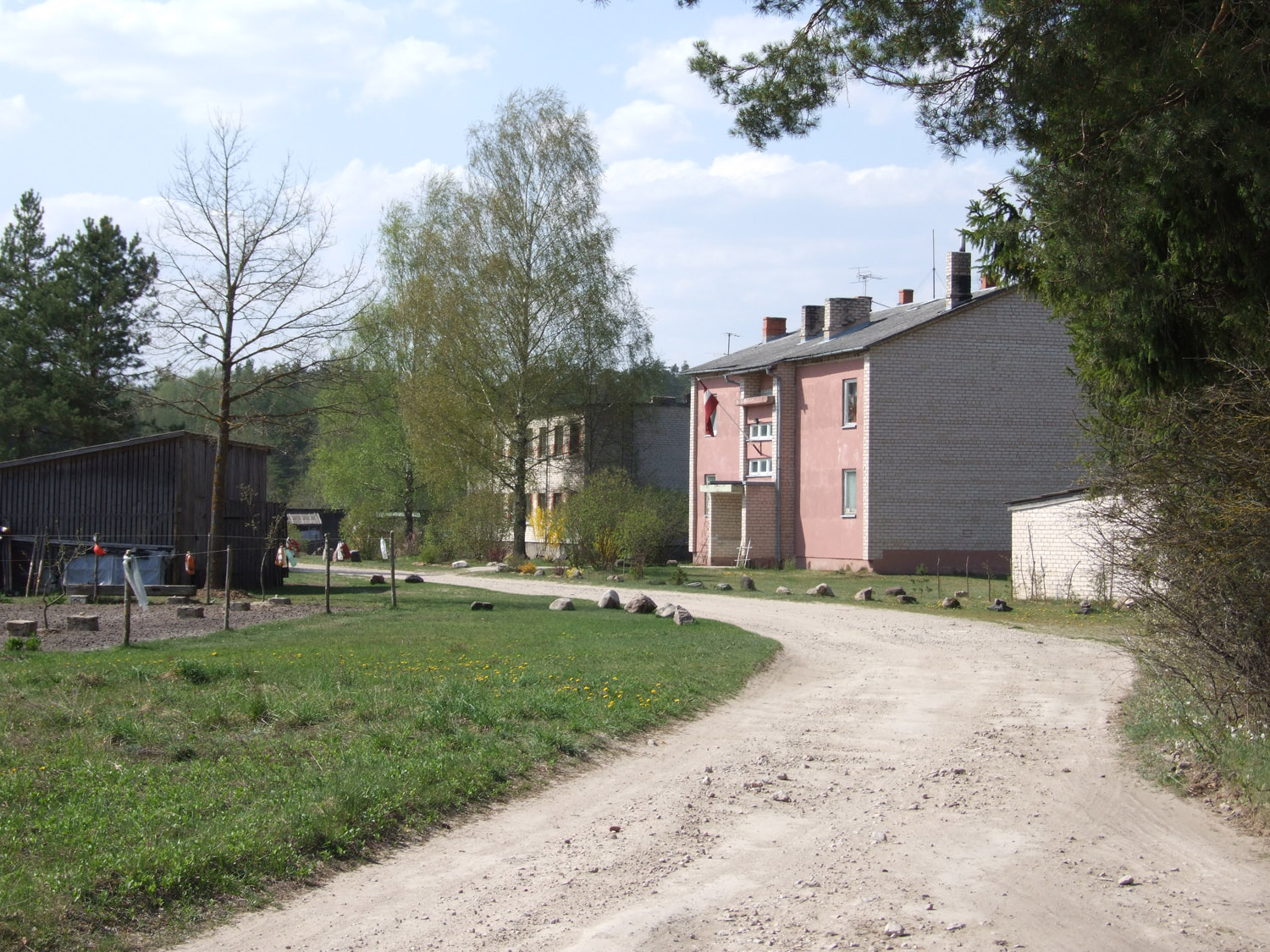
- Street in Dzelzāmurs

- Location within Latvia
- Coordinates: 56°39′44″N 24°21′0″E
- Country: Latvia
- Municipality: Bauska Municipality
- Parish: Iecava Parish

Area
  - Total: 0.284 km^{2} (0.110 sq mi)
- Elevation: 25 m (82 ft)

Population (2021)
  - Total: 27
- ZIP Code: LV-3913 Iecava

Dzelzāmurs is a village in the Iecava Parish of Bauska Municipality in the Semigallia region of Latvia. It is located in the northeast of the parish on the left bank of Misa, 13 km from the parish center Iecava, 35.5 km from the county center Bauska and 41 km from Riga.

The village was formed near the former Dzelzāmurs forest estate (Eisenhammer). Dzelzāmurs hunting palace was built in 1904 (cultural and historical monument). The palace is a log building decorated with wood carvings, which belonged to the owner of the Lieliecava manor, Count Peter von der Pahlen. Currently a guest house.

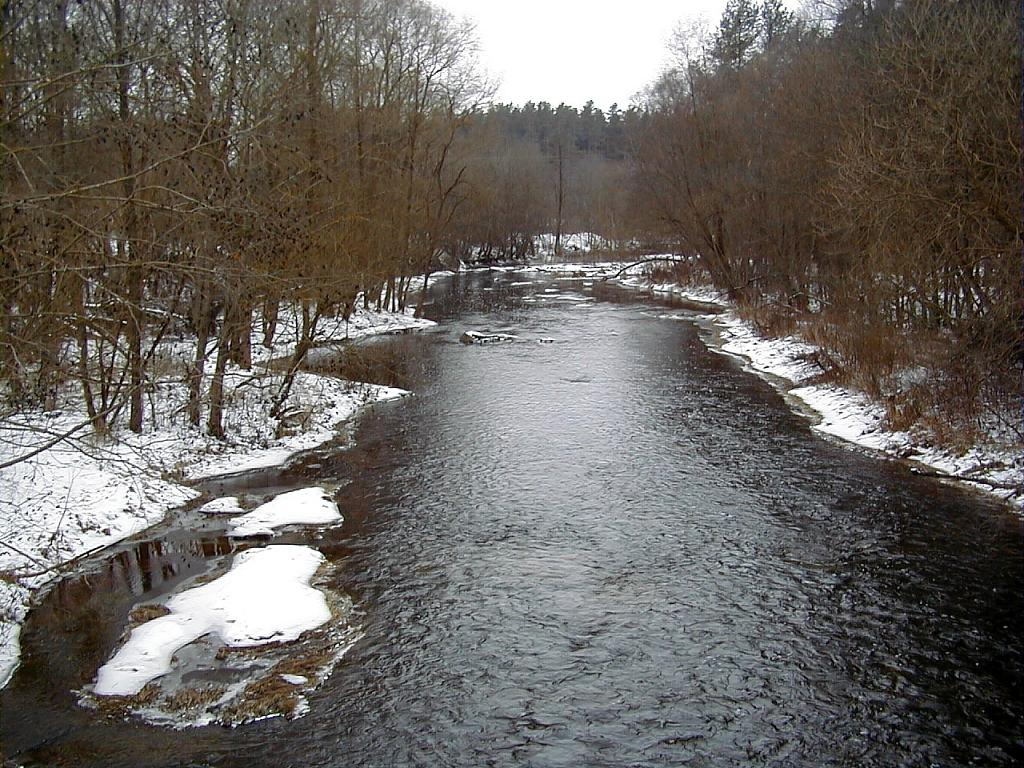
The river Misa

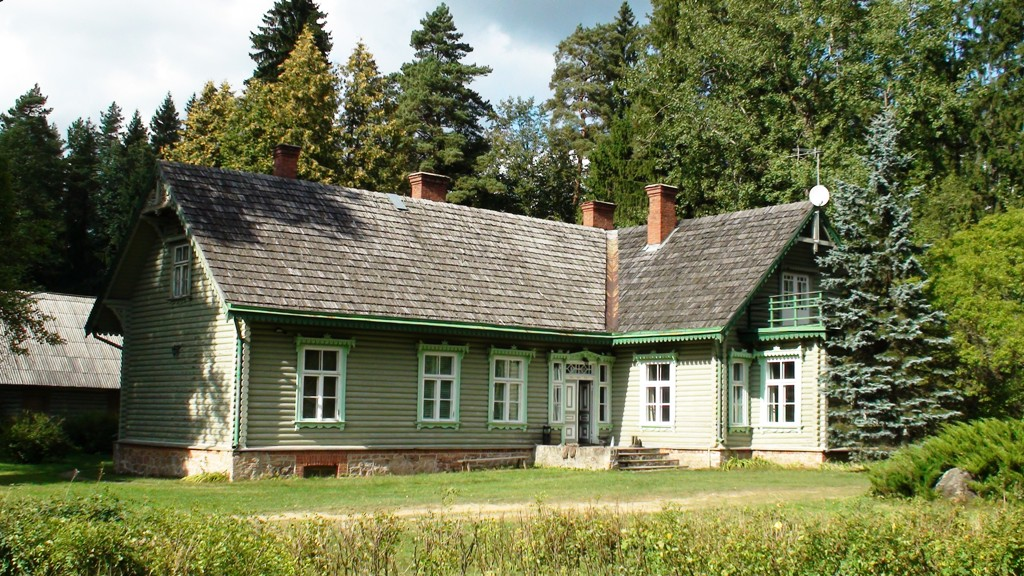
Dzelzāmurs hunting palace

== Population ==
Within existing borders, using CSP and OSP data.

Historical population in Dzelzāmurs
Year / Pop. / ±%; 2000 / 54 / —	Year / Pop. / ±%; 2011 / 37 / −31.5%	Year / Pop. / ±%; 2021 / 27 / −27.0%
