= Jānis Rieksts =

Latvian photographer

Jānis Rieksts (or Reeksts; 21 May 1881 – 21 November 1970) was a Latvian autodidact photographer.

Rieksts was born at Iecava Parish in the Zemgalian countryside. He lost both of his parents at an early age and moved to Riga at the age of 17. For some years he worked as a manual labourer, and in 1901 he opened his first studio in Torņakalns with his own capital.

Rieksts was a renowned photographer, mostly for the documentation of the fights during World War I in Latvia, especially the fierce fights of Machinegun Hill (Latvian: Ložmetējkalns) during the Christmas Battles, but also for the many portrait photographs of Latvian dignitaries (amongst them people like Rainis, Aspazija and Emīls Dārziņš).

After the end of World War II, Rieksts worked for the company Rīgas foto until his retirement in 1964.

Rieksts died in Riga at the age of 89, and was buried at the Riga Forest Cemetery.
