= Baldoni =

Baldoni is an Italian surname. Notable people with the surname include:

- Emily Baldoni (born 1984), American actor, director, and filmmaker
- Enzo Baldoni (1948–2004), Italian journalist killed in Iraq
- John Baldoni (born 1954), American-born executive coach and leadership educator
- Justin Baldoni (born 1984), American actor and filmmaker

Fictional characters:

- Carlo Baldoni, a Highlander character
