= Rosme, Bauska Municipality =

Rosme Ūdri
- Village
- Location within Latvia
- Coordinates: 56°32′13″N 24°11′49″E
- Country: Latvia
- Municipality: Bauska Municipality
- Parish: Iecava Parish

Area
  - Total: 0.2 km^{2} (0.077 sq mi)
- Elevation: 27 m (89 ft)

Population (2021)
  - Total: 89
  - Estimate (2024): 70
  - Density: 440/km^{2} (1,200/sq mi)
- ZIP Code: LV-3928 Šautleri

Rosme (IPA: /ruɔ͡ sme/; also Ūdri) is a village in the Iecava Parish of Bauska Municipality in the Semigallia region of Latvia. Located in the southern part of the parish near the A7 highway, 9 km from the parish center Iecava, 17 km from the municipality center Bauska and 54 km from Riga.

The village was established in the post-war years as a village of the kolkhoz "Rosme" (later - a section of the Soviet farm "Progress"). The Šlauteri post office is located in Rosme.

== Population ==
In existing borders, using OSP data.

Historical population count

Year	Pop.	±%
1970	195	—
1979	196	+0.5%
1989	176	−10.2%

Year	Pop.	±%
2000	148	−15.9%
2011	127	−14.2%
2021	89	−29.9%
