= Dace Akmentiņa =

Latvian actress (1858–1936)

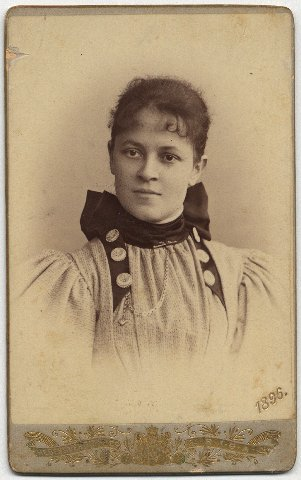
- Portrait, 1896
- Born: Doroteja Šteinberga; 3 July 1858; Kreis Bauske, Russian Empire
- Died: 16 March 1936 (aged 77); Riga, Latvia
- Resting place: Forest Cemetery, Riga
- Occupation: theatre actress

Dace Akmentiņa (3 July 1858 – 16 March 1936) was a Latvian actress, and one of the first Latvian theatre stars.

== Biography ==
Dace Akmentiņa was born Doroteja Šteinberga on 3 July 1858 in Kreis Bauske to a poor family. She attended school for 3 years. From 1875, Akmentiņa lived in Riga. Here she worked in the theatre and sung in a choir, but also worked as a seamstress. Her first role was as Vana in 1886, in Mikhail Glinka's opera A Life for the Tsar. It was this role which launched her acting career. Her acting career declined after 1914, with her last performance taking place in 1922. In her height, she was considered a fashionable woman during the period of Art Nouveau.

== Notable acting roles ==
- Kārlēns in Skroderdienas Silmačos by Rūdolfs Blaumanis.
- Kristīne in The Fire by Rūdolfs Blaumanis.
- Mirdza in Vaidelote by Aspazija.
- Gretchen in Faust by Johann Wolfgang von Goethe.
- Ophelia in Hamlet by William Shakespeare.
- Desdemona Othello by William Shakespeare.
