= Trevor Copp =

Canadian theatre artist and mime

Trevor Copp is a Canadian actor, dancer, director, playwright, and mime. He is best known as the founder and current Artistic Director of Tottering Biped Theatre, and for his role in the internationally touring shows The Last 15 Seconds and Amal with MT Space.

His work in theatre and mime notably includes Searching for Marceau, for which he was awarded the Tosho Cutting Edge Award in 2019 at the Toronto Fringe Festival.

In 2016, he created Shakespeare by Nature, a yearly Shakespeare performance staged formerly at the Royal Botanical Gardens in Burlington, ON, and currently performed at Dundurn Castle in Hamilton, ON.

== Career ==
=== Training ===
Copp trained in theatre at University of Waterloo, and completed his Master's Degree in Theatre at University of Guelph. He also trained in mime at Marcel Marceau École International de Mimodrame, in Paris, France.

=== Dance ===
Copp used to be a full-time ballroom dance instructor, a three time Fred Astaire Canadian Latin Dance Champion, and former Fred Astaire Canadian Ballroom Dance Champion. He went on to coach two pairs of dancers that became world salsa champions.

He and his dance colleague, Jeff Fox, created First Dance, a theatre and dance piece about the development of the first dance for a same sex wedding, which also showcased their concept of "liquid lead" dancing. In 2015, the concept was presented for TEDx Montreal, and later rebroadcast on the main TED Talk platform.

=== Theatre ===
In 2009, Copp created Tottering Biped Theatre, a professional theatre company which puts a focus on original, topical, and highly physical work. Original productions that he's created include: The Second Life, Journey to the East, First Dance, Bulfinch's Mythology, and the mime/theatre hybrid show Searching for Marceau.

Also in 2009, he was a co-creator of The Last 15 Seconds with MT Space, a play portraying the death of Syrian-American filmmaker Moustapha Akkad during a series of coordinated terrorist attacks in the Jordanian capital Amman in 2005. The play drew critical acclaim and toured around the world, including showings in Tunisia, Syria, Lebanon, Germany, Morocco, and Egypt.

In 2016, through Tottering Biped Theatre, he created Shakespeare by Nature (previously Shakespeare at the Rock and Shakespeare at the Castle), with the aim to create a lasting legacy project for the Hamilton area. After four years of performances at the Royal Botanical Gardens Rock Garden in Burlington, the company relocated to Dundurn Castle in 2021.

Copp has taught theatre, mime, and physical movement (specializing in Laban movement) at various universities and colleges in Canada and the US, including McMaster University, Niagara University, University of Waterloo, Brock University, and University of Guelph.

=== Mime ===
After attending Marcel Marceau École International de Mimodrame, Copp began busking with mime early in his career, and began producing longer, full length mime shows through Tottering Biped Theatre, including Physical Illusion, The Carnival of the Animals, and Searching for Marceau. One of his goals with mime was to bring the art form to modern audiences, creating a modern form of mime, and abolishing the notion of mime being a novelty form of theatre.

Copp created Searching for Marceau as a semi-autobiographical portrayal of his journey to discovering mime, and the relationship between both his father and Marcel Marceau, told through storytelling and mime segments. In 2019, the play was toured to the Toronto Fringe Festival in Toronto, ON, where it was awarded the Tosho Cutting Edge Award, granted to a show voted as the most cutting-edge show of the festival.

Also in 2019, Copp debuted Carnival of the Animals, a series of mime pieces portraying the animals of Camille Saint-Saëns’ Le Carnaval des animaux, performed alongside a live orchestra while a narrator read original works of poetry written by Copp.

== Awards ==
- 2012 K.W. Irmisch Arts Award for Burlington, ON Arts Person of the Year
- 2012 Chalmers Arts Fellowship, Ontario Arts Council
- 2013 Ontario Contact OnTour Artist of the Year Award
- 2019 Tosho Cutting Edge Award for Searching for Marceau, Toronto Fringe Festival
- 2019 City of Hamilton Arts Award for Theatre (Established)
- Fred Astaire Canadian Latin Dance Champion
- Fred Astaire Canadian Ballroom Dance Champion
