= Esmeralda Ermale =

Latvian actress

- Born: December 5, 1956 (age 69); Iecava, Latvian SSR, Soviet Union (Latvia)
- Occupation: actress
- Years active: 1973—present
- Spouse: Aldis Kušķis (2023-present)
- Awards: Memorial sign of a member of the barricades "A cocked hat" (2004)

Esmeralda Ermale (since marriage Esmeralda Treimane (born December 5, 1956, Iecava) is a Latvian actress.

== Education ==
Esmeralda Ermale received her secondary education at the Iecava secondary school. Later she studied at the People's Film Actors Studio of the Riga Cinema Studio and at the Theater Faculty of the State Conservatory. In 1977, she graduated from the VI studio of Dailes Theater.

== Career ==
Esmeralda Ermale has been working at the Fine Arts Theater since 1974. In 1977 and 1978 she was a staff actress of the theater. She later left her job due to downsizing, but in 2022 she again participated in Ināra Slutka's play Women's Parts. She has acted in films since 1973, when she made her cinema debut as Baiba in Gunara Pieš's film Pūt, vējini.

Ermale also works on television, hosting the programs "Dzivite" (previously LTV1, now LNT) and "Daudz laimes!" (LTV1).

== Filmography ==
Year	Name	Role	Notes
1973	"Pūt, vējiņi"	Baiba	cinema debut
1976	"Šīs bīstamās balkona durvis"	Marina	
1976	"Meistars"	artist (episode)	television feature film
1978	"Lielā Jaungada nakts"	Linda	television feature film
1982	"Īsa pamācība mīlēšanā"	Ilze	
1989	"Tapers"	episode	
2003	"Likteņa līdumnieki"	Berta	LNT series
2004	"Liepājas blūzs"	Inese	LNT series
2007/2008	"Svešā dzīve"	Anita	LNT series
2011/2012	"Tikai nesaki man Bizu"	Baiba Niedra	LNT series
2019	"Viss pa jaunam!"	Olga Fūrmane	TV3 series

== Personal life ==
Ermale was married to the well-known architect Edgars Treimanis for more than 30 years. Two daughters have grown up in the family: Liene and Ilze.

== External sites ==
- Esmeralda Ermale filmas.lv
- Profils kino-teatr.ru
  - E.Ermale Dailes teātra mājas lapā
  - Esmeralda Ermale izrades.lv
