= Iecava (river) =

River in Latvia

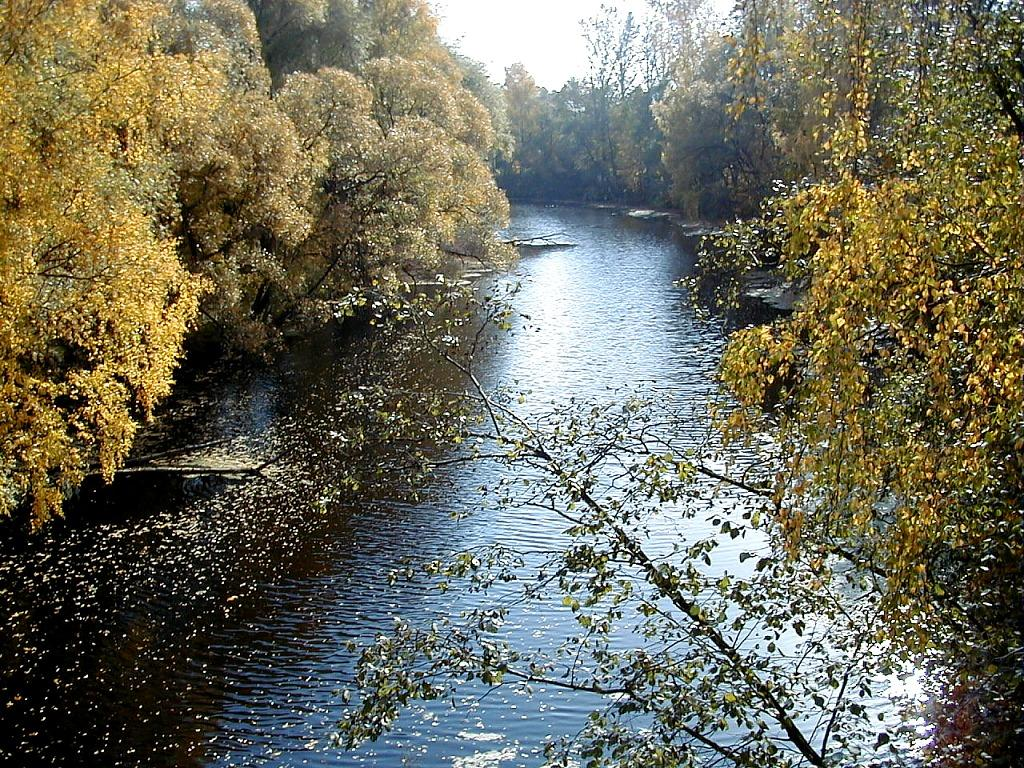
- The Iecava river in autumn near Ozolnieki village

Location
- Country: Latvia

Physical characteristics
- Source
  - location: Daudzese Parish, Aizkraukle Municipality, Latvia
- Mouth: Lielupe, Jelgava Municipality
  - coordinates: 56.6869°N 23.6994°E
- Length: 155 km (96 mi)
- Basin size: 2,172 km^{2} (839 sq mi)

Basin features
- Progression: Lielupe→ Baltic Sea
- Tributaries
  - right: Misa

The Iecava is a river in Latvia, in the regions of Selonia and Semigallia. Its source is formed from several springs in Daudzese Parish, Aizkraukle Municipality. Its mouth is located 4 km below the town of Jelgava on the Lielupe river.

The Iecava flows through Taurkalne and Upmale plains of Middle Latvia lowlands (Viduslatvijas zemiene) where its banks are mainly wooded. Near the town of Iecava it crosses the Zemgale plain and reaches Lielupe river in Tīreļi plain, both also in Middle Latvia lowlands. Administratively, it flows through districts Aizkraukle, Bauska and Jelgava (in borders since 2021).

The main water source (more than 50%) for the Iecava is water from melting snow, whereas water from groundwaters is minimal (4-5%); as a result the river is usually in spate in the springs and has low water level in summers. To combat the spring flooding, the river has been largely straightened and the bed deepened. A canal was dug 19 km above the old mouth to Lielupe, which drains part of the waters of the Iecava. The rest flows into the Lielupe through the former bed, which is now called Veciecava ("Old Iecava") at this stage.

The Iecava has around 400 tributaries (including rivers, streams and ditches), the biggest of them are:

Left bank:

- Kuma - 6 km
- Ģirupe - 12 km
- Smārde - 12 km
- Ģedulis - 11 km
- Īkstrums - 23 km

Right bank:

- Sudmaļupe - 6 km
- Svētupe 6 km
- Dzērvīte - 11 km
- Briede - 10 km
- Vēršupe - 15 km
- Smakupe 26 km
- Jāņupe - 20 km
- Biržiņa - 16 km
- Misa - 108 km
