= John Baldoni =

American writer

- Education: London Film School Georgetown University
- Occupation: Leadership Coach
- Website: https://www.johnbaldoni.com

John Baldoni (born 1952) is an executive coach, speaker and an author who has written 15 books on leadership published by the American Management Association and Mc-Graw-Hill, some of which have been translated into other languages (Mandarin, Hungarian, Japanese, Korean etc).

== Biography ==
Baldoni is an executive coach, keynote speaker and an author who has authored several books on leadership published by the American Management Association and Mc-Graw-Hill.

== Reviews ==
According to the Harvard Business Review, Baldoni's "Lead Your Boss" provides useful advice on how to handle all of this with aplomb. Just as important, it offers encouragement and inspiration. The book breaks its lessons down into simple steps that are no less valuable for being, in many instances, predictable." The AORN Journal stated in its review of "Lead Your Boss, "Although it is aimed at the middle manager, this book has practical application for leaders at all levels."

== Bibliography ==
- Grace Under Pressure: Leading Through Change and Crisis, PostHill Press, April 2023
- Grace Notes: Leading in an Upside-Down World, Printopya, 2021
- Grace: A Leader's Guide to a Better Us, Indigo River Publishing, 2019
- MOXIE: The Secret to Bold and Gutsy Leadership, Taylor and Francis, 2015
- The Leader's Guide To Speaking With Presence, Amacom 2014
- The Leader's Pocket Guide: 101 Indispensable Tools, Tips and Techniques for Any Situation, Amacom Fall 2012
- Lead With Purpose: Giving Your Organization a Reason to Believe in Itself, Amacom
- 12 Steps to Power Presence: How to Assert Your Authority to Lead, Amacom 2010
- The AMA Handbook on Leadership (with Marshall Goldsmith and Sarah McArthur), Amacom 2010
- Lead Your Boss: The Subtle Art of Managing Up, Amacom 2009
- Lead By Example: 50 Ways Great Leaders Inspire Results, Amacom 2008
- How Great Leaders Get Great Results, McGraw-Hill 2006
- Great Motivation Secrets of Great Leaders, McGraw-Hill 2005
- Great Communication Secrets of Great Leaders, McGraw-Hill 2003
