= Johann Freytag von Loringhoven =

Master of the Livonian Order from 1483 to 1494

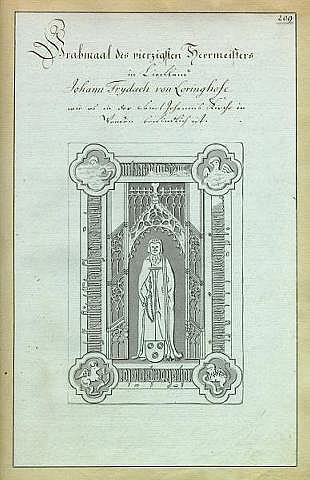
Grave plate

Johann Freitag von Loringhoven (c. 1430 – 26 May 1494), also known as Johann Freytag von Loringhoven, and Johann Fridach van Loringhoffe, was a knight of the Teutonic knights and a member of the Freytag von Loringhoven family. Most notably, from 1483 to 1494, he was a Master (Landmiester) of the Livonian Order.

== Biography ==
Johann Frietag von Loringhoven was one of the eight knights of the Freytag von Loringhoven family that operated in Livonia. After the forced abdication of his predecessor, Bernhard von der Borch (1471-1483) he was elected as Master of the Livonian Order. He ended the 200-year struggle for power inside the Livonian Order by carefully balancing warfare and politics. In the Livonian civil war, he fought in the battles of Stinsee and the battle of Neuermuhlen (near Riga). After the civil war, his reign brought about the longest peacetime in ancient Livonian history. When the foreign enemies of Livonia began to make war against them, this peacetime had allowed Livonia to become a strong and religious state.

Von Loringhoven soon recognized the talent of Wolter von Plettenberg and appointed him Master in 1489.

Preceded by Bernhard von der Borch	Master of the Teutonic Order in Livonia; 1483–1494	Succeeded by Wolter von Plettenberg
