= A7 road (Latvia) =

Road in Latvia

Coordinates: 56.610924°N 24.214064°E

A7

Route information
- Part of E67
- Length: 85.6 km (53.2 mi)

Major junctions
- From: Riga
- A 5 near Ķekava P 89 near Ķekava; P 92 near Iecava; P 93 near Iecava; P 94 near Code; P 87 near Bauska P 103 near Bauska
- To: Lithuania; E67 / A 10

Location
- Country: Latvia
- Major cities: Riga, Baloži, Ķekava, Iecava, Bauska

Highway system
- National Roads in Latvia
← A 6	→ A 8

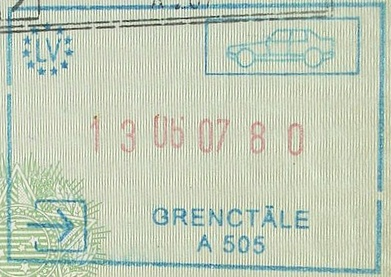
A pre-Schengen passport stamp from Grenctāle at the start of the A7 at the border with Lithuania.

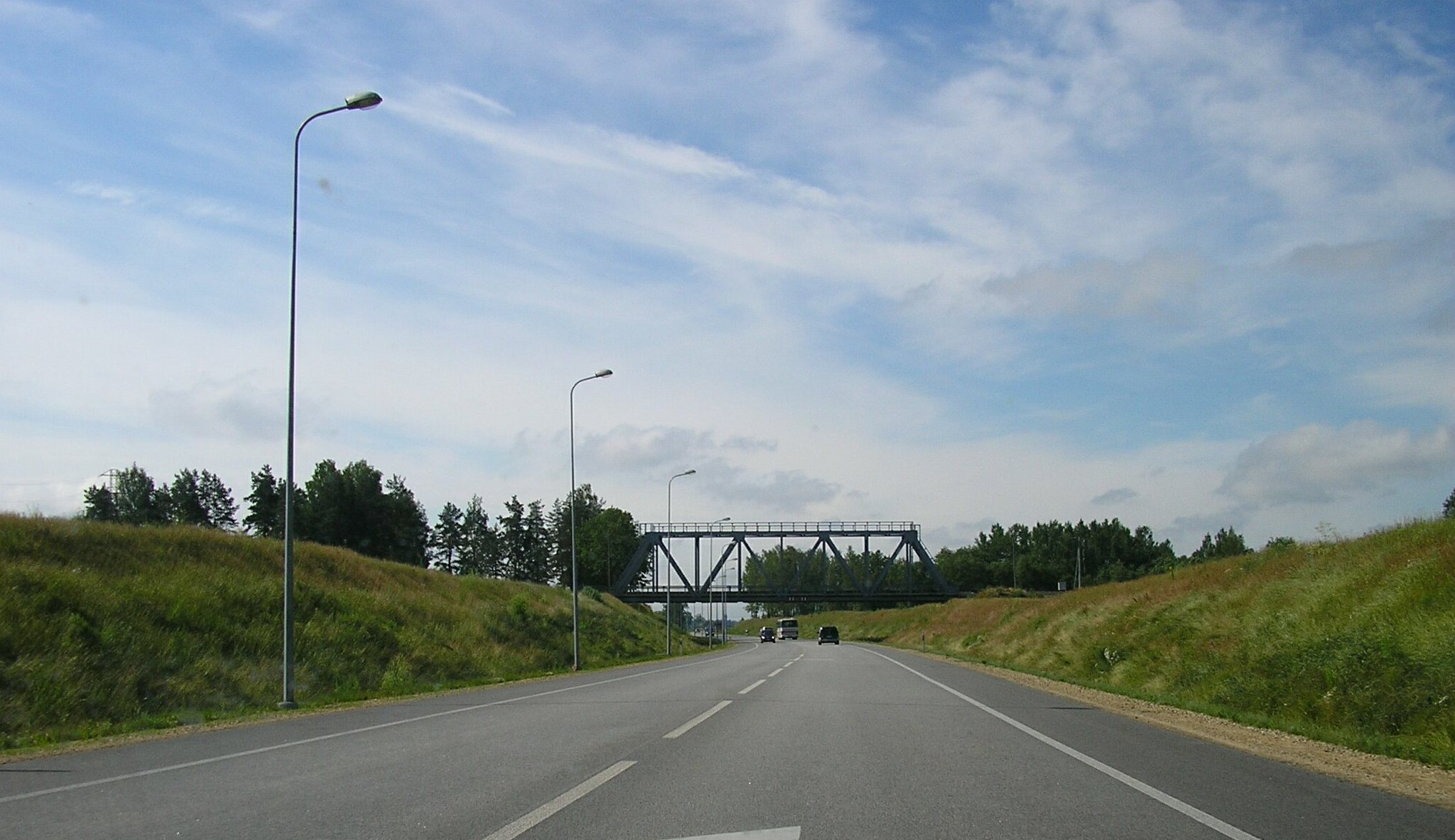
A7 highway near Iecava

The A7 is a national road in Latvia connecting Riga to the Lithuanian border (Grenctāle), through Bauska. The road is also known in Latvia as the Bauska Highway. The A7 is part of European route E67 (also known as the Via Baltica) and the European TEN-T road network. At the Lithuanian border, it continues as the Lithuanian A10. The length of the A7 in Latvian territory is 86 kilometers. The road has 2×2 lanes within Riga and on parts of the Riga–Ķekava corridor, including the Ķekava bypass section from around km 7.8 to km 25.0, while most of the remaining route toward Bauska and the Lithuanian border remains 1×1. The general speed limit is 90 km/h outside built-up areas, with lower limits of 50–70 km/h in urban areas; on the designated high-speed section of the Ķekava bypass, the limit is up to 120 km/h for vehicles up to 7.5 tonnes.

In period of 2005 - 2006, the A7 was reconstructed from the 25th until the 43rd kilometer and from the 67th until the 85th kilometer. A 2 kilometer stretch of the road was reconstructed in Iecava, and reconstruction of another 15 kilometer long stretch was finished in 2012.

In recent years, further development of the A7 has focused on addressing congestion and safety along the busy Via Baltica corridor. The most significant milestone was the opening of the Ķekava bypass in October 2023, which redirected transit traffic away from the densely populated Ķekava municipality. Since opening, average daily traffic on the bypass has reached around 18,000 vehicles per day, easing pressure on the old A7 alignment. Preparations are also underway for further A7 upgrades between the Ķekava bypass and Bauska. The project is planned in two stages: the first stage is the Bauska bypass, while the second stage includes the Iecava bypass and the connection toward the Ķekava bypass. The Bauska bypass is planned as a 14.25 km new A7 section with about 5.0 km of connector roads, delivered under a design–build–finance–maintain PPP model. Real-estate acquisition and design work are ongoing, with construction expected to begin in the second half of this decade and completion targeted by 2030. Meanwhile, traffic volumes remain high: the 2025 average daily traffic on the A7 reached 30,365 vehicles near Riga and 6,016 vehicles near the Lithuanian border. Together, these projects and improvements form part of a broader effort to gradually upgrade the A7 corridor to higher standards, reducing bottlenecks, improving safety, and ensuring smoother international transit along Via Baltica.

== Road length of lane ==
8 km	12 km	23 km	2 km	20 km	4 km	17 km
Urban	2+2 road	1+1 road	Urban	1+1 road	Urban	1+1 road
