= Iecava =

Town in Bauska Municipality, Latvia

Iecava German: Eckau
- Town
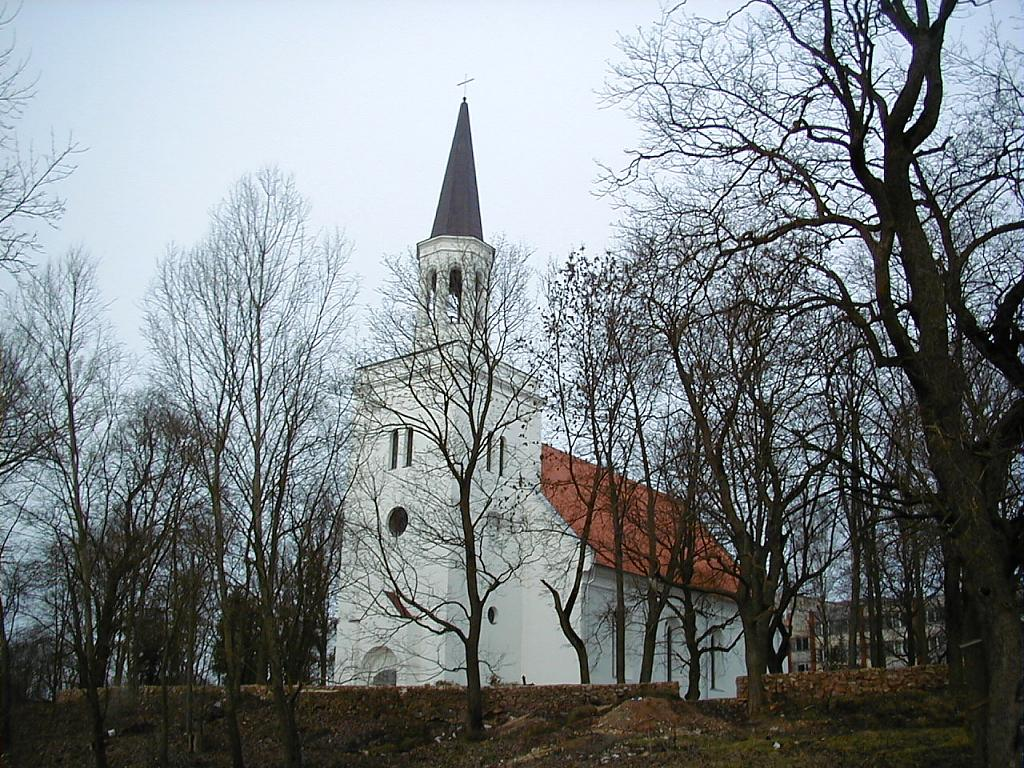
- Lutheran church in Iecava.

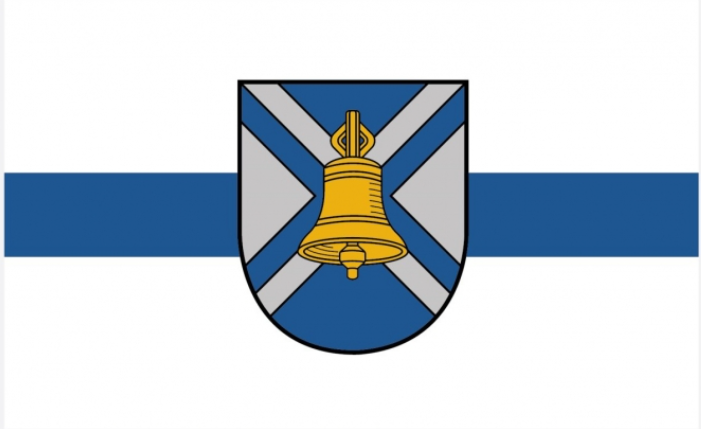
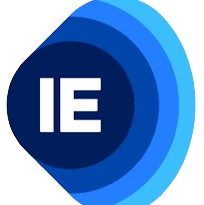
- Flag Coat of arms Brandmark
- Anthem: "Ciematā dzimtajā"
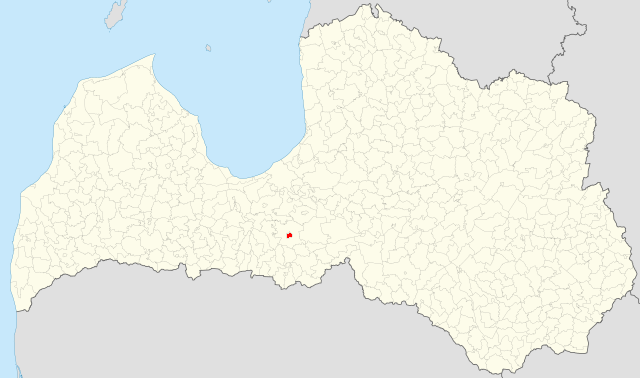
- Location in Latvia (in red)
- Coordinates: 56°36′N 24°12′E
- Country: Latvia
- Municipality: Bauska Municipality
- First mentioned: 1492
- Village status: 1990
- City rights: 1 July 2021

Government
  - Chair of Iecava Town and Parish: Normunds Vāvers

Area
  - Total: 13.86 km^{2} (5.35 sq mi)
  - Land: 0.353 km^{2} (0.136 sq mi)
  - Water: 0.325 km^{2} (0.125 sq mi) 2.35%

Population (2023)
  - Total: 9,681
- Demonym: Iecavnieks (Latvian) Iecavan
- Time zone: UTC+2 (EET)
  - Summer (DST): UTC+3 (EEST)
- Postal code: LV-3913
- Website: Iecava official site

Iecava is a town and the administrative center of Iecava Parish in Bauska Municipality, located in the Zemgale region of Latvia approximately 40 kilometers south of Riga and 23 kilometers north of Bauska. First documented in historical records in 1492, it was officially granted town status on 1 July 2021 and encompasses an administrative area with a population of 9,681 as of 2023.

The locality is characterized by fertile agricultural lands supporting food processing industries, including a recently opened €10 million seed production facility representing the most modern certified operation in the Baltics, alongside historical sites such as a Lutheran church and former manor house that contribute to its regional tourism appeal.

== Geography ==
=== Location and Topography ===
Iecava is situated in Bauska Municipality, within the historical Semigallia (Zemgale) region of southern Latvia, approximately 40 kilometers south of the capital Riga and 23 kilometers north of Bauska. The settlement lies along the Via Baltica (European route E67) highway, which connects it to major transport corridors linking the Baltic states. Its geographic coordinates are roughly 56°36′N 24°12′E, placing it in a central position relative to Latvia's lowland terrains. The topography of Iecava features the characteristically flat expanse of the Zemgale Plain, a broad, low-elevation area dominated by glacial deposits and sandy soils typical of post-glacial landscapes in the region. This plain intersects with the adjacent Middle Latvian Lowland and the sandy Riga Lowland, resulting in minimal relief variation, with elevations generally below 50 meters above sea level and no significant hills or escarpments nearby. The Iecava River, a 155-kilometer waterway distinct from the namesake town itself, originates from multiple springs in the upstream Daudzese Parish and flows through the surrounding plains, contributing to local drainage patterns and hydrological features such as wetlands and seasonal flooding zones. These riverine elements, including protected sulfur springs in areas like the Ellītes purvs Natura 2000 site, shape the subtle variations in the otherwise uniform terrain.

=== Climate and Environment ===
Iecava lies within a humid continental climate zone (Köppen Dfb), featuring pronounced seasonal variations with cold, snowy winters and mild, relatively short summers. Average January temperatures hover around -5°C to -6°C, often dipping below freezing with snowfall accumulation, while July averages approximately 17°C, occasionally reaching highs near 23°C during warmer spells. Annual precipitation totals roughly 700 mm, with moderate rainfall distributed across months, peaking slightly in summer and contributing to consistent soil moisture essential for regional agriculture. The Zemgale region's fertile, marshy black soils underpin agricultural sustainability, enabling intensive crop production that shapes local livelihoods and food security amid climate variability. These soils retain nutrients effectively but face erosion risks from precipitation and land use, highlighting the need for practices that preserve fertility for long-term viability. Environmental dynamics are influenced by the lowland plains and river systems, including the Iecava River, which foster wetland habitats supporting diverse flora and fauna such as riparian vegetation and aquatic species. However, the flat terrain amplifies flooding risks during heavy rains or snowmelt, periodically disrupting ecosystems and biodiversity by altering water flows and habitats. Regional efforts emphasize river basin management to mitigate these threats, focusing on natural processes to enhance resilience without extensive alterations.

== History ==
Iecava was first mentioned in 1492, when the Master of the Livonian Order, Johann Freytag von Loringhoven, issued a document regarding the duties of peasants from Iecava and Mežotne regarding the local estate.

There is earlier proof of inhabitants of Semigallia settling the area. Today, in the center of Iecava, there was a camp, in which there have been found many items even from the Stone Age such as war hammers and work hammers. Two early tombs of the Iron Age were also explored.

In the 14th century Iecava was subordinated into the Livonian Order. From mid 16th century to end of 18th century the town was part of the Duchy of Courland. In 1567, with the order of the Duke of Courland, a separate Iecava-Lambarte congregation was founded, for which the Lutheran Church began to be built in 1641. During the Duchy of Courland in 1652-1845, Iecava became a local industrial center with copper, tar, lime, brick and coal kilns, dolomite quarries, paper mills, flax and monochrome weave weaver, and stud workshops. Cannons (two of them are displayed in the center of Iecava), cannon balls, ship nails, and boilers were produced.

After adding Courland to Russian Empire, Iecava became a crown manor. In 1795, the estate was acquired by Count Peter von der Paul, to whom the Russian Empress Catherine II donated the previously rented Lieliecava Manor, and came to Paul's "eternal ownership". Count Paul's reign brought Iecava a lively boom - Iecava Castle was built in 1795-1890 and an English-style landscape park of 17.2 hectares with a large variety of native tree species and exotic species was created.

During the Napoleon's invasion of Russia in 1812, significant clashes took place in Iecava. During the French invasion, Colonel de Tolly, the brother of the famous Russian officer Michael Barclay de Tolly, died here. Legends say that several bullets fired during the campaign have left marks still visible on the walls of Iecava Church. On July 7, 1812, the Battle of Iecava took place, where the French army, led by generals von Grawert and Kleist von Nollendorf, defeated Russian troops.

In the 19th century there were 16 manors in the territory of Iecava (Branti, Briede, Grienvalde, Misa, Zorģe manor, etc.). In 1827 the Dzimtmisa School was opened, 1858. - the Iecava School, 1864. - the Misa School. At the end of the 19th century, the rapid development of capitalism and the geographical position of Iecava contributed to the development of the village and its administrative center. In 1869 a parish house was built, in 1876 - the school of Iecava parish. In 1885, a pharmacy was opened in Iecava, which is still in operation in this building. In 1891, the new Peace Court building, including customs, police, post office (now houses a cultural house), was completed. During this time, too, Craftsmen's House (now - post office).

During the first world war, two years in the vicinity of the frontline, Iecava was hit hard. Iecava Palace was destroyed in 1915 with the deportation of the Russian army from Riga. From the palace complex, the library housing of the Earl Leonid von der Pahlen, the horse stables, and the three park guards' houses have remained.

Although Iecava suffered greatly during the First World War - there were only 43 homes with 139 inhabitants in the 1920s - it quickly recovered due to convenient traffic and fertile soils.

At the time of the first Republic of Latvia, 17,000 hectare of the land of the Lieliecava Manor was divided into new holdings, while the manor was converted into a village with 400 building blocks. In 1935, there were 709 residents in the village. In the second half of the 1930s, Iecava had two schools, three libraries, a hospital, many commercial and industrial companies, and several associations.

On 23 August 1936, the Freedom Monument was built in Iecava Park. The monument was carved from Latvian granite by artist Pēteris Banders.

=== Soviet occupation ===
The end of the first year of the Soviet occupation of Latvia (1940–41) is dramatic for Latvia as a whole and also for Iecava - a large part of the population of the parish was deported. The second wave of deportations over Iecava came in 1949. Only a portion of the deported returns. On June 14, 1990, at Iecava station, the sculptor Mārtiņš Zaurs designed monument was discovered to the victims of Stalinist repression, “The pain semaphore.”

The years of Soviet occupation are marked by forced collectivization. After World War II, more than 10 kolkhozes were established in Iecava territory, combined in the 1970s in the “Iecava” kolhoz (a/s “Rakmente”, etc., founded in the early 1990s), p/s “Progress” (several companies were created in the early 1990s, including co-operative societies “Ikstrums” and “Rosme”, SIA, Iecava) and p/s Zālīte

In 1958, by decree of the Supreme Council of the Latvian SSR, the heavily populated area “Iecava” is transformed into a working village. There are 1242 residents in the village this time around.

By the end of the 1950s, the food industry began to grow in Iecava. A distillery was reconstructed in 1957, a dairy combined in 1962, a bakery was built in 1961. In 1968, a combined feed plant started production, in 1973 the Iecava Poultry Factory was created (now a/s “Balticovo”, the largest producer of eggs in the Baltics).

On 1 February 1963, the village of Iecava workers was transformed into a city village.

In the 1980s, a strong agrarian complex base has developed in Iecava's urban village and its surroundings. The Iecava station contains an intermediate-Republican fertilizer base, a combined forage plant, and an asphalt-concrete plant. The area comprises an Iecava bird factory, a distillery, a dairy and other businesses. Large agricultural production companies were here. The overall atmosphere was affected by the former presence of three parts of the USSR rocket bases.

=== After independence ===
In the early 1990s, with the recovery of Latvia's independence and rapid changes in economic life, Iecava and its surroundings also changed. Some of the Soviet troops were leaving and there was a change in the legal status of many companies in the area.

In 1990, the Council of Members of the People of Iecava chose in favour of the parish when examining the question of changing the status of the village as a part of the 1990 Latvian administrative reform. The village became a part of Iecava Parish, Bauska district.

On 12 August 2003, the deputies of Iecava parish council unanimously decided to establish the Iecava Municipality within the administrative territorial borders of the civil parish of Iecava and, on the basis of regulation 708, adopted by the Cabinet on 16 December 2003, “Provisions on the establishment of the Municipality of Iecava of the Bauska district”, thus Iecava Parish became the Iecava Municipality (1 January 2004). After the 2009 Latvian administrative reform, districts were abolished and Iecava Municipality became a first-level administrative unit of the country. During the 2021 administrative reform, this was de facto reverted and Iecava Municipality was merged into Bauska Municipality as the town of Iecava and Iecava Parish.

== Notable people ==
Prominent Latvians born in Iecava include Friedrich Wilhelm Matisohn (1871-1913), Verners Tepfers (1893–1958), Esmeralda Ermale, Arvīds Pelše.

- see also Bauska Municipality#Notable people

== See also ==
- Battle of Ekau
