= Patriks Gailums =

Latvian javelin thrower (born 1998)

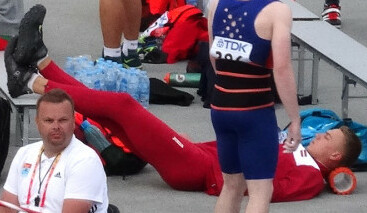
- Gailums resting at the 2016 World U20 Championships in Athletics

Personal information
- Nationality: Latvia
- Born: 10 May 1998 (28 years, 107 days old) Ikšķile, Latvia

Sport
- Sport: Athletics
- Events: Javelin throw Shot put

Achievements and titles
- National finals: 2015 Latvian U18s; • Javelin throw, 1st (gold); 2015 Latvian Champs; • Javelin throw, 6th; 2016 Latvian Champs; • Javelin throw, 6th; 2017 Latvian U20s; • Javelin throw, 1st (gold); 2018 Latvian Champs; • Javelin throw, 3rd (bronze); 2019 Latvian Champs; • Javelin throw, 3rd (bronze); 2021 Latvian Champs; • Javelin throw, 3rd (bronze); 2022 Latvian Champs; • Javelin throw, 2nd (silver)
- Personal bests: JT: 84.05m (2023); JT (700g): 77.15m NYR (2015); SP: 15.34m (2023)
Medal record
Men's athletics
Representing Latvia
European Championships
Bronze medal – third place	2026 Birmingham	Javelin throw
European Youth Olympic Festival
Bronze medal – third place	2013 Utrecht	Javelin throw
- Updated on 26 December 2023

Patriks Gailums (born 10 May 1998) is a Latvian javelin thrower. He won the bronze medal at the 2026 European Championships, silver at the 2022 European Throwing Cup, and is a four-time medalist at the Latvian Athletics Championships.

== Career ==
=== 2013–2018 ===
In July 2013, Gailums won bronze in the javelin throw at the European Youth Summer Olympic Festival in Utrecht with a throw of 65.73 meters. Two years later, he finished in 11th place at the World U18 Championships in Cali with a throw of 66.75 meters. In July 2016, Gailums set a new personal best of 74.02 meters in the qualifiers at the World U20 Championships in Bydgoszcz. However, in the final, he did not reach the same level and finished in 11th place with a throw of 66.84 meters.

In July 2017, Gailums set a new personal best with a throw of 81.91 meters at a competition in Valmiera, which also became a new world junior best for the year. Later that month at the European Junior Championships in Grosseto, he finished in fourth place with a throw of 73.43 meters. In July 2018, Gailums took bronze at the Latvian championships in Riga with a throw of 75.57 meters. The following month, he finished 14th overall in the qualifiers at the European Championships in Berlin with a throw of 78.10 meters, which was not enough for a place in the final.

=== 2019–2022 ===
In July 2019, Gailums finished in fourth place at the European U23 Championships in Gävle with a throw of 79.81 meters. Later that month, he took his second consecutive bronze at the Latvian championships in Ogre with a throw of 77.47 meters. In June 2021, Gailums took his third bronze at the Latvian championships in Jelgava with a throw of 77.81 meters. In March 2022, he won silver at the European Throwing Cup in Leiria with a throw of 79.49 meters.

In May 2022, Gailums improved his personal best twice. First, he improved it by 66 centimeters to 82.57 meters at a competition in Ogre and then by over another meter to 83.65 meters at a competition in Kalamata, Greece. The following month, Gailums won silver at the Latvian championships in Valmiera, only beaten by Rolands Štrobinders. In July 2022, he competed at the World Championships in Eugene, but did not advance from the qualifiers in the javelin throw. The following month, Gailums competed at the European Championships in Munich, where he finished in sixth place in the javelin throw.

=== 2023–2026 ===
In June 2023, Gailums improved his personal best by 40 centimeters to 84.05 meters at a competition in Bergamo. In August 2023, he competed at the World Championships in Budapest, but did not advance from the qualifiers, finishing in 21st place overall.

Gailums won the bronze medal at the 2026 European Championships in Birmingham, England, with a throw of 82.97 metres.

== Statistics ==
=== Personal bests ===
Event	Mark	Place	Competition	Venue	Date	Ref
Javelin throw	84.05 m	1st place, gold medalist(s)	Italian Athletics Clubs Championships	Bergamo, Italy	10 June 2023	
Javelin throw (700 g)	77.15 m NU18R	1st place, gold medalist(s)	Jānis Lūsis Cup	Jelgava, Latvia	14 June 2015	
Shot put	15.34 m sh	2nd place, silver medalist(s)	Valmiera Open	Valmiera, Latvia	21 January 2023	
