= 2009 Latvian Athletics Championships =

- Edition: 19th
- Dates: 31 July-1 August
- Host city: Ventspils, Latvia

The 2009 Latvian Athletics Championships were held in Ventspils, Latvia on July 31 and August 1, 2009.

== Men ==
Event	Gold		Silver		Bronze	
100 m	Ronalds Arājs	10.74	Sandis Džiguns	11.10	Ēvalds Zunda	11.16
200 m	Jānis Leitis	21.57	Jānis Mezītis	21.65	Sandis Džiguns	22.61
400 m	Jānis Baltušs	48.15	Andris Ūdris	48.62	Valdis Iļjanovs	48.92
800 m	Dmitrijs Jurkevičs	1:49.42	Kristaps Valters	1:54.00	Valts Boginskis	1:55.23
1 500 m	Dmitrijs Jurkevičs	3:55.07	Edgars Šumskis	4:02.24	Jānis Razgailis	4:02.88
3 000 m	Mareks Florošeks	8:31.67	Jānis Višķers	8:35.05	Raivis Zaķis	8:39.24
5 000 m	Valērijs Žolnerovičs	14:32.05	Mareks Florošeks	14:34.94	Raivis Zaķis	14:52.45
4 × 100 m	Guntis Bērziņš; Jānis Mezītis; Gatis Zālītis; Jānis Leitis	42.03	Juris Kožeurovs; Henrijs Arājs; Ēvalds Zunda; Ronalds Arājs	42.20	Kārlis Spēlmanis; Sandis Džiguns; Armands Avens; Māris Grēniņš	43.61
4 × 400 m	Ģirts Dubinskis; Raivo Vožņaks; Andris Ūdris; Jānis Baltušs	3:19.22	Jānis Leitis; Guntis Bērziņš; Pauls Leikarts; Kārlis Daube	3:25.10	Kristaps Reinfelds; Igors Vikainis; Maksims Semjonovs; Edgars Miļus	3:38.71
110 m hurdles	Kārlis Daube	14.31	Jānis Jansons	14.65	Armands Bērziņš	15.26
400 m hurdles	Valdis Iļjanovs	52.45	Andris Ūdris	52.63	Andrejs Romaņivs	53.76
3 000 m steeplechase	Konstantīns Savčuks	9:19.47	Aigars Matisons	9:34.36	Kaspars Gulbis	9:36.29
Triple Jump	Maksims Tkačovs	15.51	Pāvels Kovaļovs	15.35	Elvijs Misāns	15.28
Long Jump	Jānis Leitis	7.58	Māris Grēniņš	7.28	Toms Andersons	7.12
High Jump	Normunds Pūpols	2.20	Jānis Vaivods	2.04	Mārtiņš Karabeško	2.04
Pole Vault	Mareks Ārents	5.00	Pauls Pujāts	4.50	Atis Vaisjūns	4.50
Shot Put	Māris Urtāns	18.28	Oskars Vaisjūns	16.30	Arnis Žviriņš	15.91
Hammer Throw	Edgars Gailis	54.50	Andrejs Pavļenkovs	52.70	Jānis Podnieks	51.96
Discus Throw	Oskars Vaisjūns	53.94	Arnis Žviriņš	45.66	Matīss Zacmanis	44.94
Javelin Throw	Ēriks Rags	80.52	Ansis Brūns	78.82	Kārlis Alainis	73.21

== Women ==
Event	Gold		Silver		Bronze	
100 m	Jekaterina Čekele	11.98	Sandra Krūma	12.23	Zanda Marta Grava	12.49
200 m	Laura Ikauniece	24.72	Sandra Krūma	25.00	Inese Nagle	25.31
400 m	Ieva Zunda	53.37	Ieva Ješkina	57.60	Inese Nagle	57.61
800 m	Jeļena Ābele	2:07.62	Karīna Orlova	2:19.79	Aļona Meļņika	2:20.73
1 500 m	Jeļena Ābele	4:25.21	Lāsma Grīnberga	4:34.06	Linda Batņa	4:38.56
3 000 m	Linda Batņa	10:16.25	Jolanta Liepiņa	10:29.59	Liene Pūķe	10:53.52
5 000 m	Agnese Pastare	17:46.36	Anita Čuhnova	18:17.83	Liene Pūķe	18:23.14
4 × 100 m	Laura Ikauniece; Linda Veidere; Gundega Zeļenkeviča; Jekaterina Čekele	47.46	Jeļena Komarocka; Helēna Ločmele; Elīna Taluce; Māra Karakone	49.53	Elīna Romonovska; Ilva Janīte; Dārta Šice; Zanda Marta Grava	49.72
4 × 400 m	Ieva Vītola; Lāsma Grīnberga; Linda Cepurīte; Aļona Meļņika	4:05.13	Paula Rozenvalde; Ilze Rūtenberga; Ieva Kalniņa; Terēze Vimba	4:06.93	Violeta Kolunova; Madara Kurpniece; Alīna Kuzņecova; Kristīne Trūpa	4:11.71
100 m hurdles	Zanda Marta Grava	14.29	Ieva Juškeviča	15.54	Ieva Kalniņa	15.95
400 m hurdles	Līga Velvere	1:00.74	Ieva Juškeviča	1:06.92	Ilze Tropiņa	1:09.72
3 000 m steeplechase	Lāsma Grīnberga	10:28.75	Sintija Krūmiņa	12:43.24	Ilze Tauriņa	13:17.63
Triple Jump	Natālija Čakova	12.74	Sabīne Skrodere	12.31	Māra Grīva	12.19
Long Jump	Lauma Grīva	6.26	Māra Grīva	5.72	Ilva Janīte	5.49
High Jump	Natālija Čakova	1.85	Liene Karsuma	1.79	Laura Ludevika	1.77
Pole Vault	Ilze Bortašķenoka	3.70	Lāsma Beķere	3.20	Maira Blūma	3.00
Shot Put	Dace Šteinerte	13.14	Linda Ozola	12.67	Inga Miķelsone	12.61
Hammer Throw	Laura Igaune	60.84	Sanita Karluša	55.79	Vaira Kumermane	55.55
Discus Throw	Dace Šteinerte	51.49	Diāna Ozoliņa	44.07	Inga Miķelsone	41.98
Javelin Throw	Madara Palameika	54.33	Sinta Ozoliņa	53.75	Līna Mūze	48.28
