= St. George's Church, Bauska =

Church building in Bauska, Latvia

Coordinates: 56.4053°N 24.1844°E

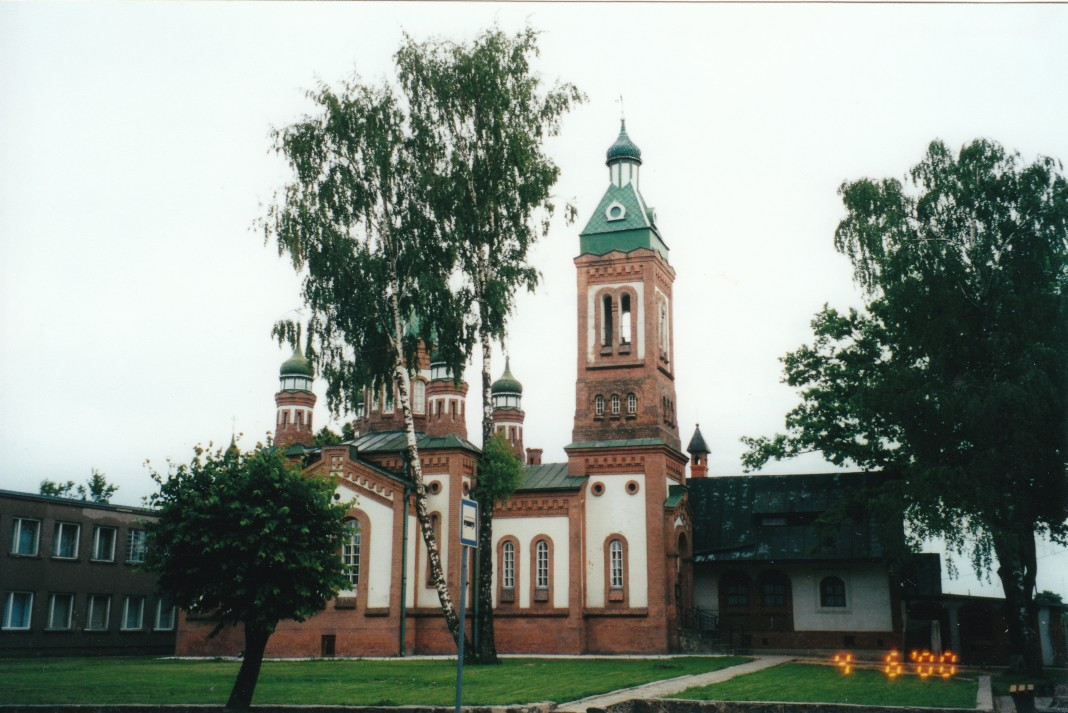
St. George's Church in Bauska

St. George's Church is a Latvian Orthodox church in Bauska, Latvia.

In 1876 czarist authorities gifted a plot of land to the local Orthodox community which was established in 1856 and by 1881 numbered 95 people.

In 1878 the project for the church was approved and in 1881 the construction of the church building was completed. It was designed a notable Latvian architect Jānis Frīdrihs Baumanis, who during this period of russification, which included promotion of the Orthodox faith by the czarist authorities, designed over 20 orthodox churches.

The church has a central cupola that is surrounded by four smaller cupolas and a large bell-tower. During the last few years the church has been renovated and iconostasis re-installed.

The church is located in the town centre of modern-day Bauska, right opposite to Bauskas Gymnasium & children's library.

== Links ==
Tourism, Bauska
