= Dace Lina =

Latvian marathon runner

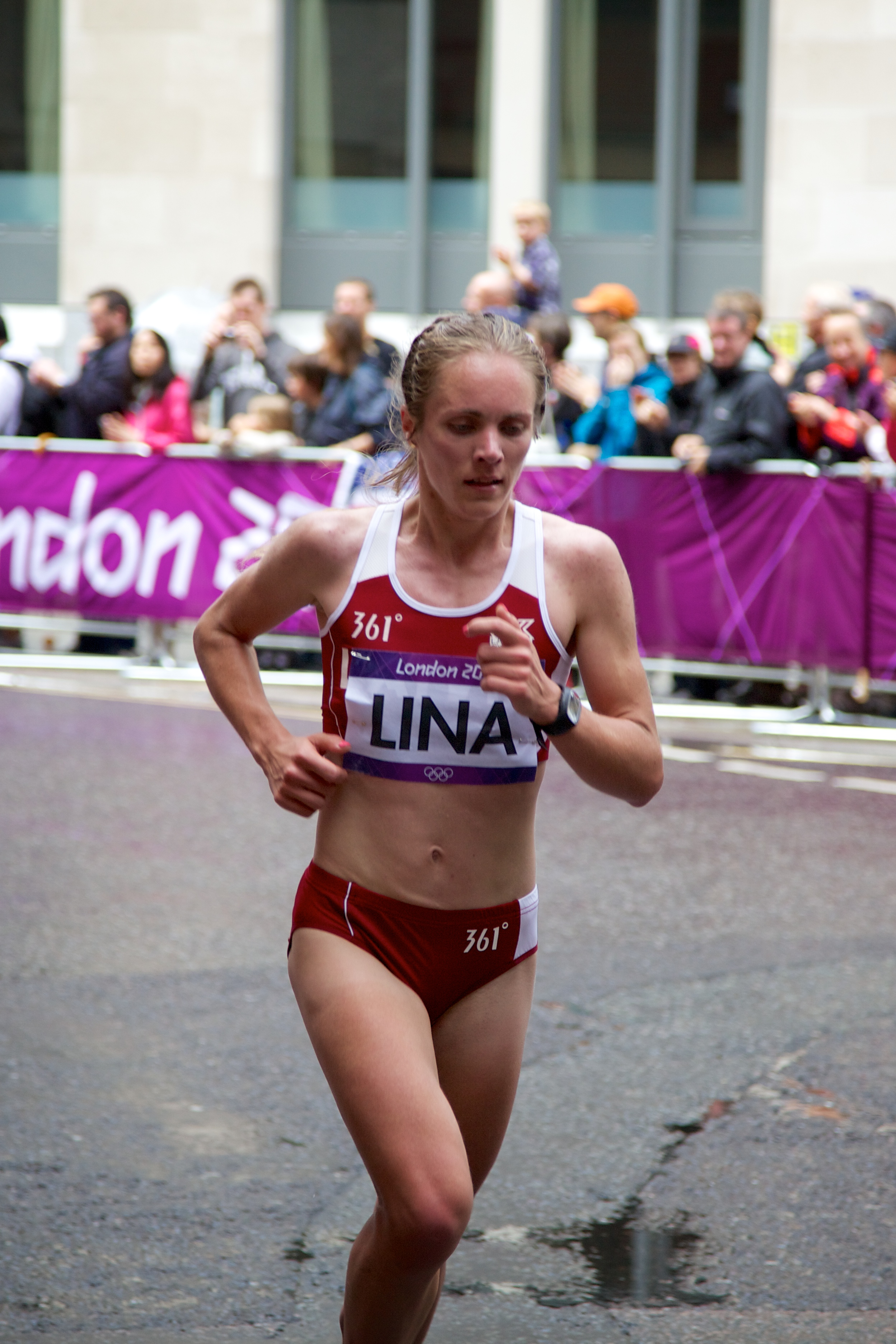
- Lina at the 2012 Summer Olympics

Personal information
- Nationality: Latvian
- Born: 1 December 1981 (age 44) Bauska, Latvian SSR, Soviet Union
- Height: 1.62 m (5 ft 4 in)
- Weight: 53 kg (117 lb)

Sport
- Country: Latvia
- Sport: Track and field
- Event: Marathon

Dace Lina (born 1 December 1981) is a Latvian marathon runner. She was born in Bauska, Latvia. She has won Valmiera Marathon in 2010 and in 2013. Lina competed at the 2012 Summer Olympics, completing the course and finishing in 98th place.
