= Monument to the Defenders of Bauska =

Coordinates: 56.4033°N 24.1781°E

The Monument to the Defenders of Bauska (Latvian: Piemineklis "Bauskas aizstāvjiem pret otrreizējo padomju okupāciju") was unveiled in the small town of Bauska in southern Latvia on 14 September 2012.

The monument is an obelisk about two metres high. The inscription reads: "To the defenders of Bauska against the second Soviet occupation on July 28 – September 14, 1944", followed by "Latvia should be a Latvian state", a quotation from a speech made by Karlis Ulmanis, Latvia's last pre-war president. The monument was built with private donations on land given by the municipal council. It was unveiled in the centre of Bauska. The monument is controversial due to allegations that it glorifies Nazism and its Latvian collaborators.

== Historical background ==
The first Soviet occupation of Latvia from 1940 to 1941 was replaced by the Nazi occupation, 1941 to 1944.

In 1944, the Red Army launched the Baltic Offensive towards the Gulf of Riga. A volunteer corps of town inhabitants was formed to protect the town against the Red Army. The volunteer forces, numbering about 300, and outnumbered tens to one, managed to hold back the offensive for six weeks, from 28 July to 14 September 1944. The Soviet bombardment of 11–14 September 1944 destroyed 100 buildings in the town and damaged more than 300 – destroying more than one third of Bauska. Most of the defenders died in the desperate fighting.

The initiator of the monument, Egils Helmanis, the grandson of one of the volunteer defenders of Bauska, stated:

"When the Red Army approached Bauska, Bauska's inhabitants had already witnessed what had happened during the first [Soviet] occupation. My grandfather enlisted in Bauska's defense because his sister had been deported to Siberia and starved to death, and no one had any news of what had happened to her children. As for my mother, she was still an infant and would not have survived the hardships as a refugee. My grandfather loved his family and went to their defense. He, as did most of those 300 men, fought and fell as defenders of a free Latvia."

== Controversy ==
Criticism centers on allegations that the monument glorifies Nazism.

The Foreign Ministry of Belarus called erecting the monument a "clear desecration of the memory of the fallen," alleging the Latvian Legion were criminals who killed Belarusian partisans and civilians. The Foreign Minister of Israel has expressed a protest on behalf of the government at a meeting with the Latvian Foreign Minister. Israeli deputy minister Marina Solodkin requested her government denounce the honoring of the Latvian Legion (Waffen SS), who she alleges were Nazi accomplices guilty of crimes against humanity.

The rehabilitation of SS members in Latvia has been strongly condemned by the respected Simon Wiesenthal Center. According to the center's director, Dr Efraim Zuroff in 2011,

The attempt to link today’s independent Latvia with those who fought for a victory of genocidal totalitarianism is a terrible omen for the future of Latvian democracy. Among those who joined the Latvian SS units were the biggest murderers of Latvian Jewry and helped kill many thousands of Jews in Belarus. To turn these murderers into patriotic heroes of the new Latvia is either the height of anti-Semitism and racism or of utter stupidity.

Members of the Latvian Anti-Nazi Association have demanded that the monument be dismantled.
