= Bauska =

Town and capital of Bauska Municipality, Latvia

- Town
- Bauska Castle

- Flag Coat of arms

- Location in Latvia
- Coordinates: 56°24′30″N 24°11′35″E
- Country: Latvia
- District: Bauska Municipality
- Town rights: 1609

Government
  - Mayor: Aivars Mačeks

Area
  - Total: 10.36 km^{2} (4.00 sq mi)
  - Land: 9.84 km^{2} (3.80 sq mi)
  - Water: 0.52 km^{2} (0.20 sq mi)

Population (2026)
  - Total: 9,566
  - Density: 972/km^{2} (2,520/sq mi)
- Time zone: UTC+2 (EET)
  - Summer (DST): UTC+3 (EEST)
- Postal code: LV-390(1-2)
- Calling code: +371 639
- Number of city council members: 11
- Climate: Dfb
- Website: www.bauska.lv/en/

Bauska is a town in its eponymous municipality, found in the Zemgale region of southern Latvia.

Bauska is located 66 km (41 mi) from the Latvian capital Riga, 62 km (38.5 mi) from Jelgava and 20 km (12 mi) from the Lithuanian border on the busy European route E67. The town is situated at the confluence of the shallow rivers Mūsa and Mēmele, where they form the Lielupe River.

Average temperatures in January are −5 °C (23 °F), and 17.5 °C (63.5 °F) in July. Rainfall averages 500–650 mm (20–26 in) annually. The 80.4% of Bauska Municipality territory is agricultural land and 13% of forests.

In previous centuries, the city was known in German as "Bauske", in Yiddish as "Boisk", in Lithuanian as "Bauskė", and in Polish as "Bowsk".

The population of Bauska is estimated to be 8,200. Bauska is the centre of Bauska Municipality, a first-level national subdivision that has a population of 24,370 with an approximate density of 30 people per km^{2.}

== History ==
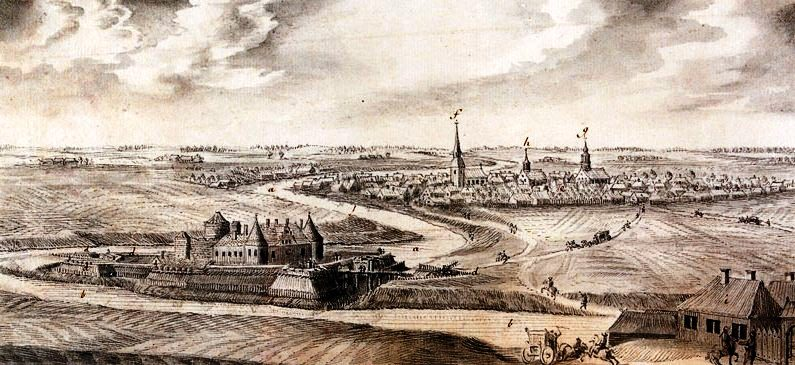
Bauska and its castle in 1706

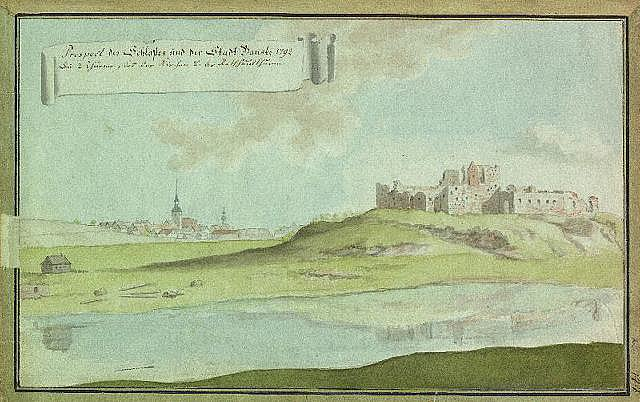
Painting of the Bauska Castle ruins with the Church of the Holy Spirit in the background, 1792

By the early 13th century, this territory was inhabited by Semigallian tribes. In the mid-15th century, Bauska castle was built by Germans of the Livonian Order, who then were a part of the Terra Mariana confederacy. In the shadow and protection of the castle, a small town called Schildburg grew on the narrow peninsula formed by the Mūsa and Mēmele rivers. Around 1580 on the orders of Duke Gotthard Kettler this settlement was relocated to the present location of Bauska Old Town, eventually receiving city rights sometime before 1609.

After the Livonian War, Bauska became part of the Duchy of Courland and Semigallia and prospered. The castle and city suffered heavily in the 17th and 18th centuries, under attacks from Sweden in the Polish-Swedish War and the Russians in the Great Northern War. In 1706, the retreating Russian army blew up the castle. In 1711, an outbreak of plague ravaged Bauska, exterminating half of the population, and war returned once more in 1812, when Bauska, after short skirmishes, became one of Napoleon's army's transit points en route to Moscow.

Between 1812 and 1914, Bauska enjoyed a period of stability, and grew as a trade centre between Riga and Lithuania. Many inhabitants were merchants or worked in ceramic-making, but there was a large brewery and sawmill as well. Bauska was still primarily built of wooden houses: in 1823, only 6 of the 120 houses within the city were built of brick or stone. For this reason, devastating fires were not uncommon.

Historically, all social affairs had been in the hands of the privileged Baltic Germans. After 1820 Jews were allowed to settle in the city, and by 1850 made up half the population, diluting the strong German influence.

The city was taken by the German Imperial Army on July 18, 1915, and roughly half the population fled (Jews were moved out on the orders of the Russian army). In 1916, the Germans installed the city's first electrical grid and built a narrow-gauge railway connection with Jelgava–Meitene Railway.

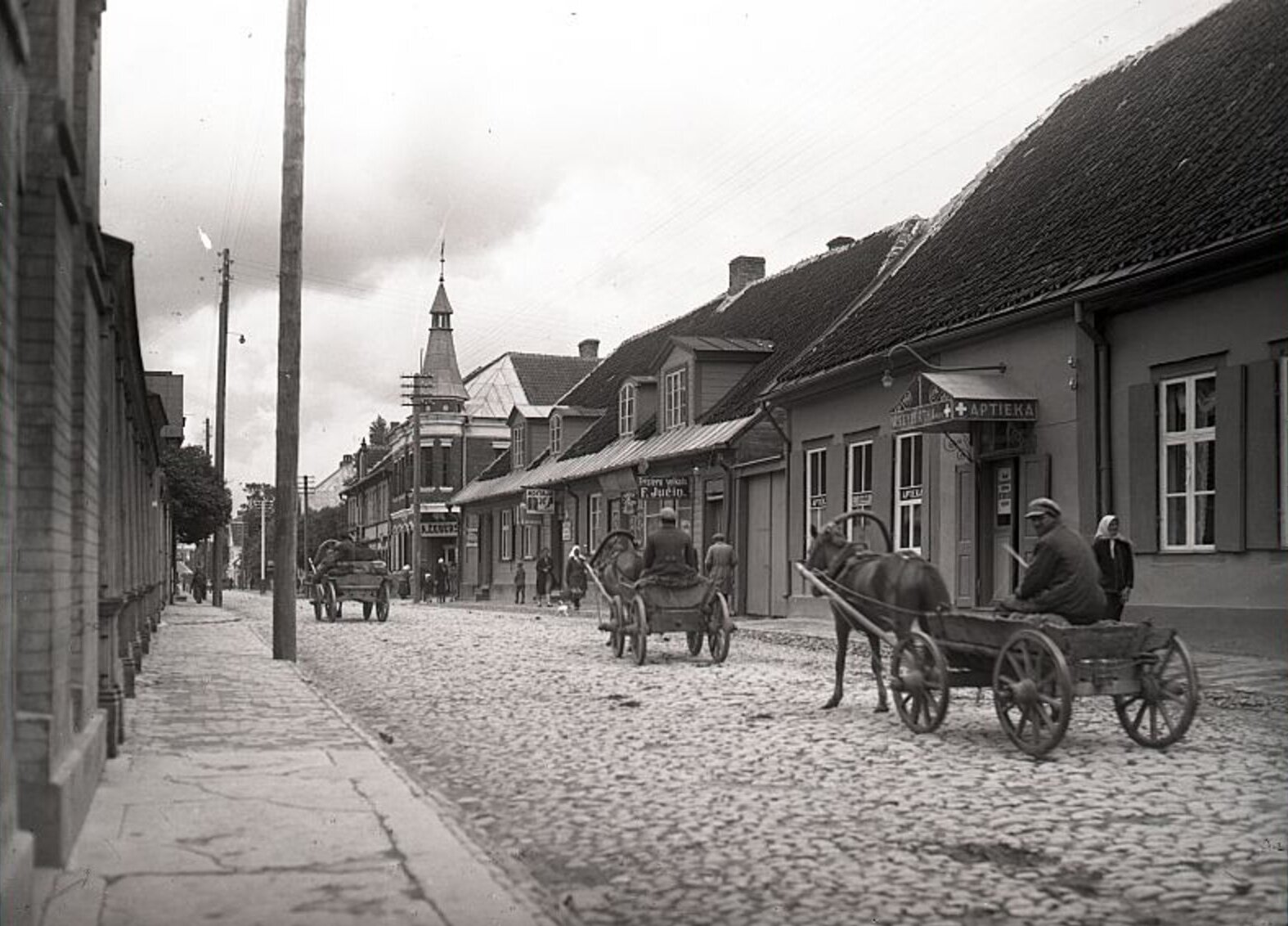
Sudmalu Street in Bauska in 1926

During the Latvian War of Independence, Bauska experienced a couple of months of Red Army occupation, followed by the periods of rule by the Baltische Landeswehr and the West Russian Volunteer Army until it was liberated in the early hours of November 17, 1919, by the Latvian army.

From 1918 to 1940, the proportion of ethnic Latvians in the population grew strongly, making up 75% of the population, though the Jews and Germans still maintained a noticeable presence. In 1939, just before World War II, virtually the entire Baltic German population of Bauska repatriated to the recently occupied Reichsgau Wartheland, causing the city to lose one of its traditional ethnic populations. As part of the Holocaust during the June–August 1941, Bauska's other traditional minority, the Jews, were exterminated.

During Operation Bagration, the Soviet army reached Bauska on July 29, 1944. For the next six weeks, the city was defended by an assortment of Latvian policemen, forcibly mobilized Latvian Legion soldiers and Wehrmacht grenadiers. After Soviet shelling and air raids, almost one third of the city was destroyed and finally captured on September 14, 1944.

Post-war reconstruction was slow. Rubble remained in the streets until the 1950s. During the Soviet period, the population surpassed 10,000, as the Latvian and especially Russian populations strongly increased.

=== History of the Jewish community ===
Bauska was home to a thriving Jewish community in the 19th century, many employed as scholars or in occupations such as baking and distilling. The town hosted several notable rabbis, including Abraham Isaac Kook, later chief rabbi of Israel, Mordechai Eliasberg, and Chaim Yitzchak Bloch Hacohen.

In 1850, Jews made up 50% of Bauska's population, and 60% in 1881. By 1920, the Jewish population had dwindled to about a sixth of the size it had been 40 years earlier. In 1941, following the Nazi invasion, the remaining Jews of Bauska and environs were tortured and executed.

An exhibition on the city's Jewish history was opened in 2011 in Bauska museum following a conference on Bauska's Jewish cultural heritage in the 1990s. A group of Jews who were former inhabitants of Bauska proposed to establish a memorial on the site of the Great Synagogue burnt down in July 1941. In October 2017, the "Synagogue Garden", a monument/memorial created by the Council of Jewish Communities of Latvia and Latvian sculptor, Girts Burvis, was dedicated on the site.

Demographics

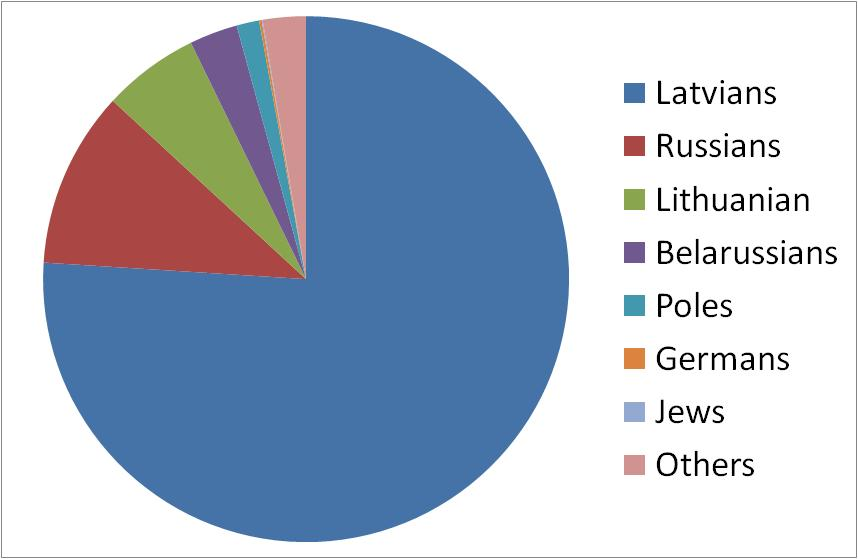
Ethnicities in Bauska

Residents of Bauska by ethnicity
Latvians	77%
Russians	11%
Lithuanians	6%
Belarusians	3%
Poles	1.41%
Germans	0.16%
Jews	.06%
Others	2.65%

In December 2004, there were 10,178 inhabitants, 55% female and 45% male.

== Tourist attractions ==
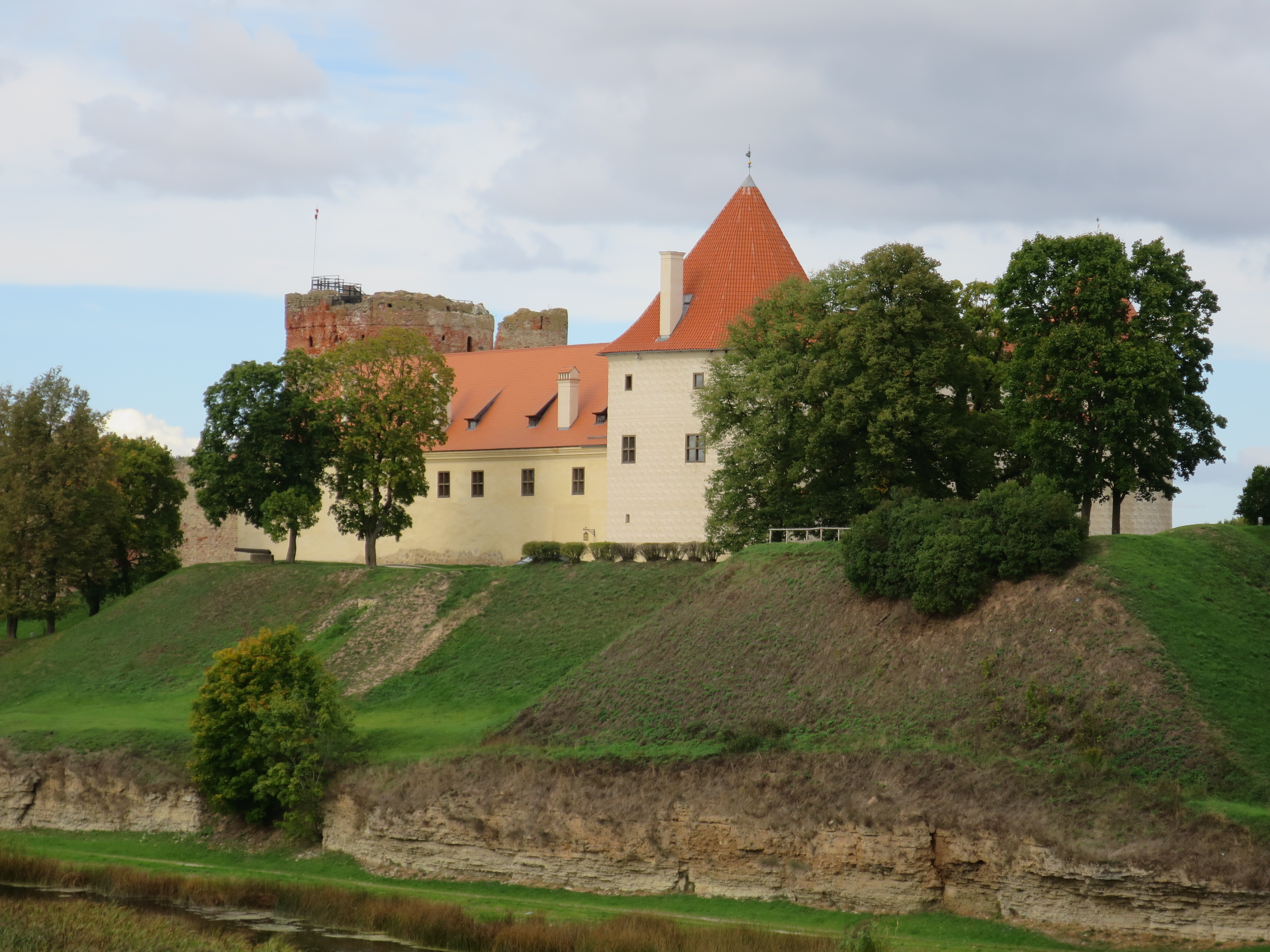
Bauska Castle

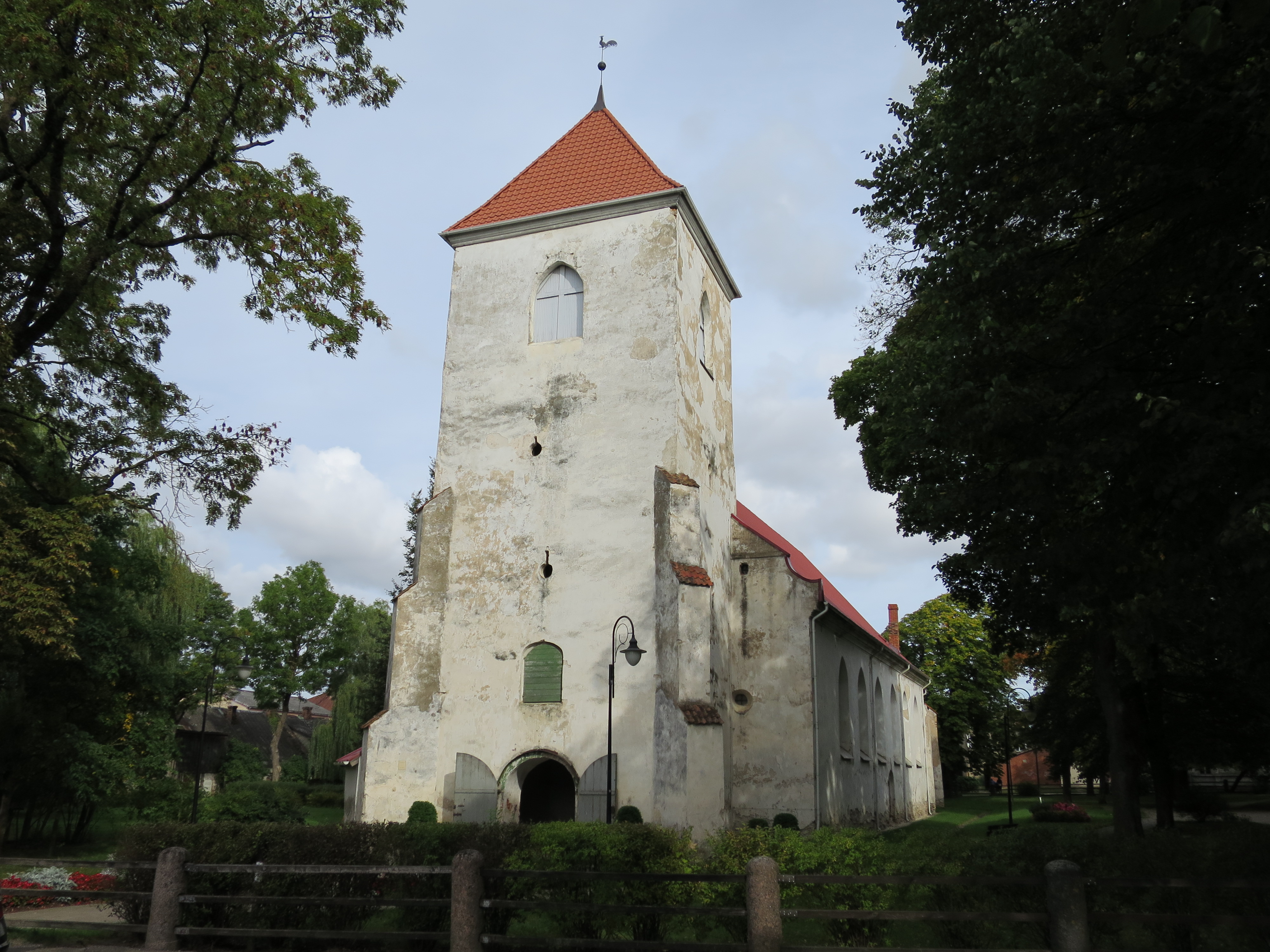
Bauska Church of the Holy Spirit the oldest building in town

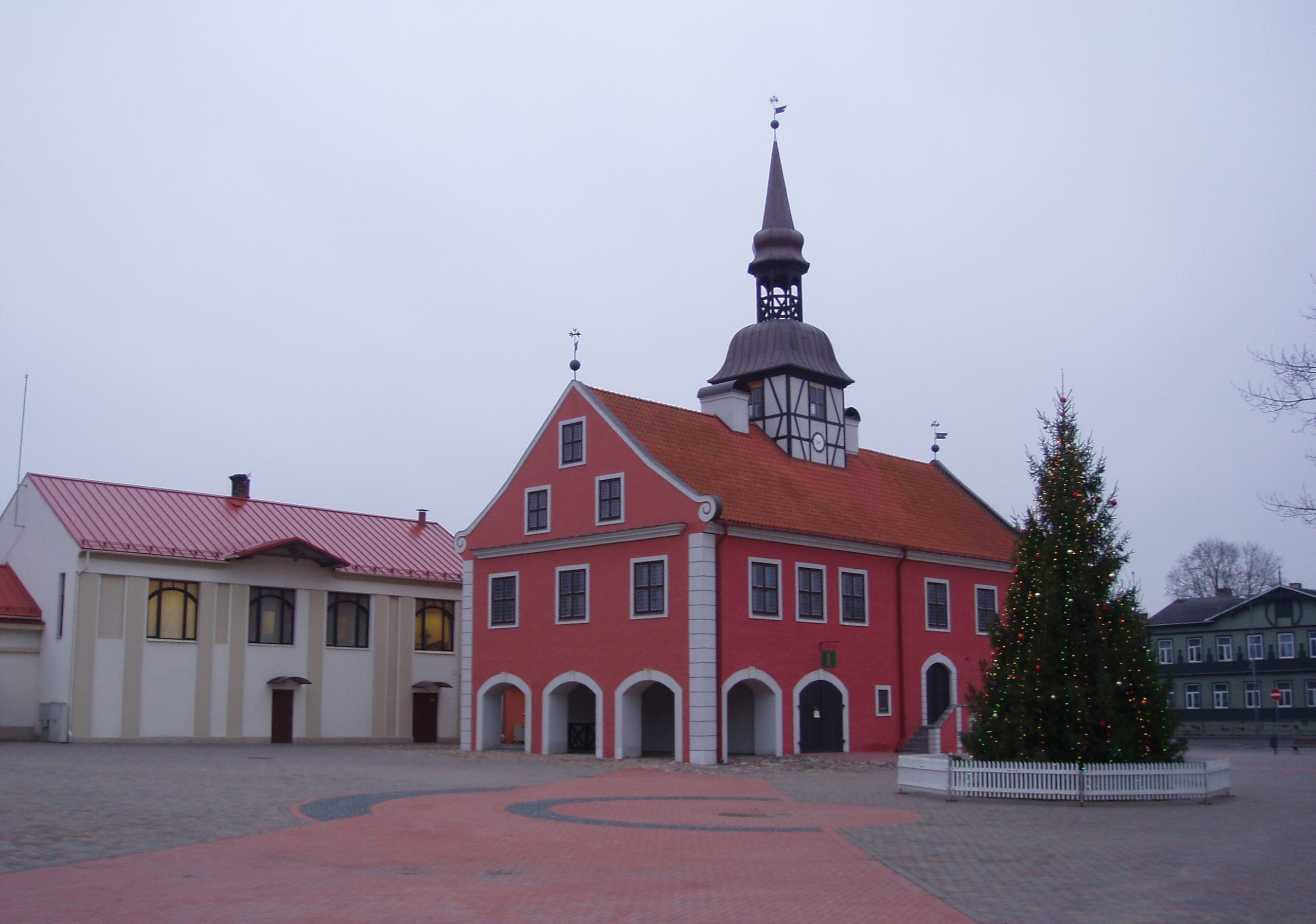
Bauska Town Hall in the Market square

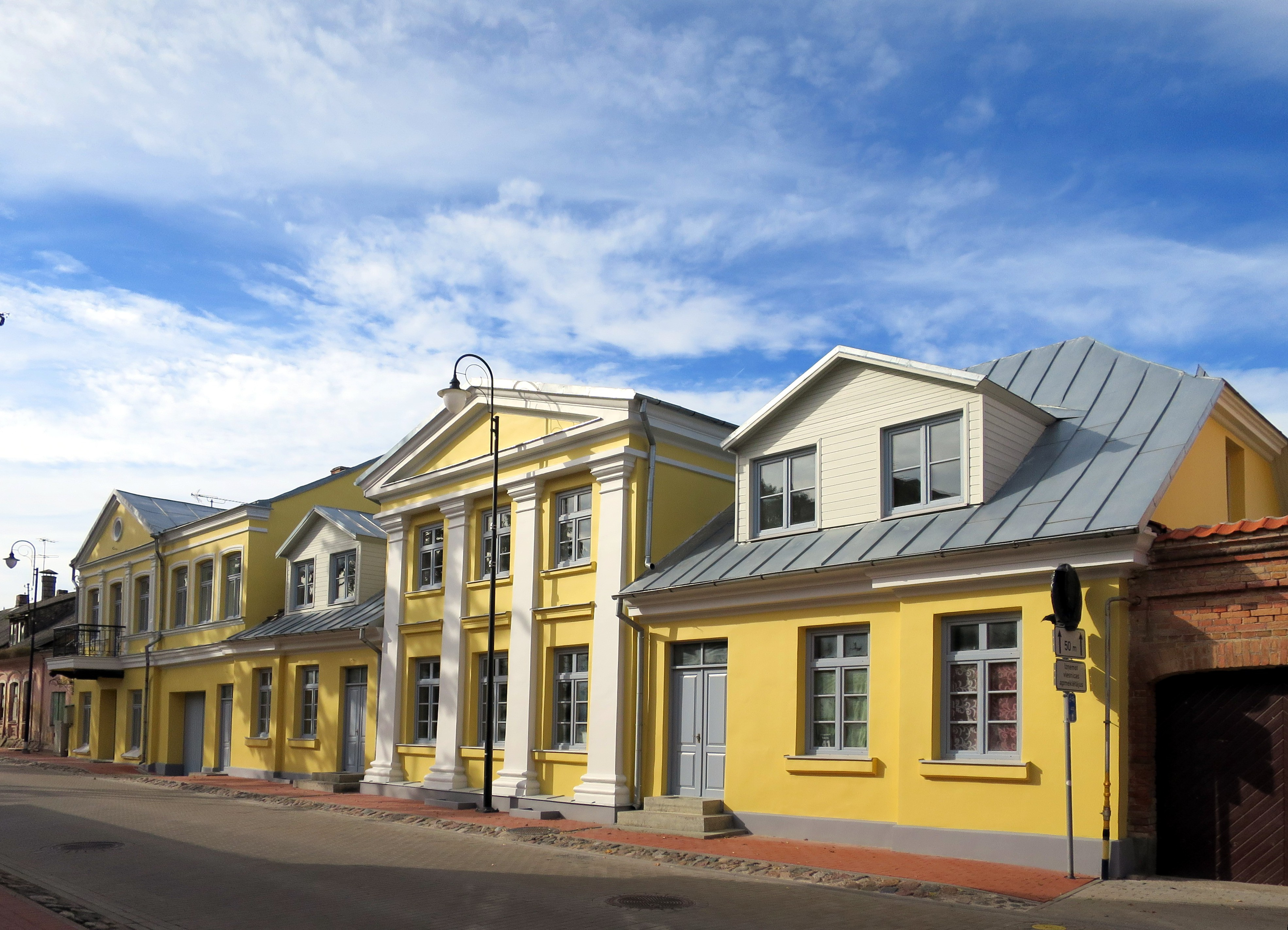
19th-century buildings on Riga street

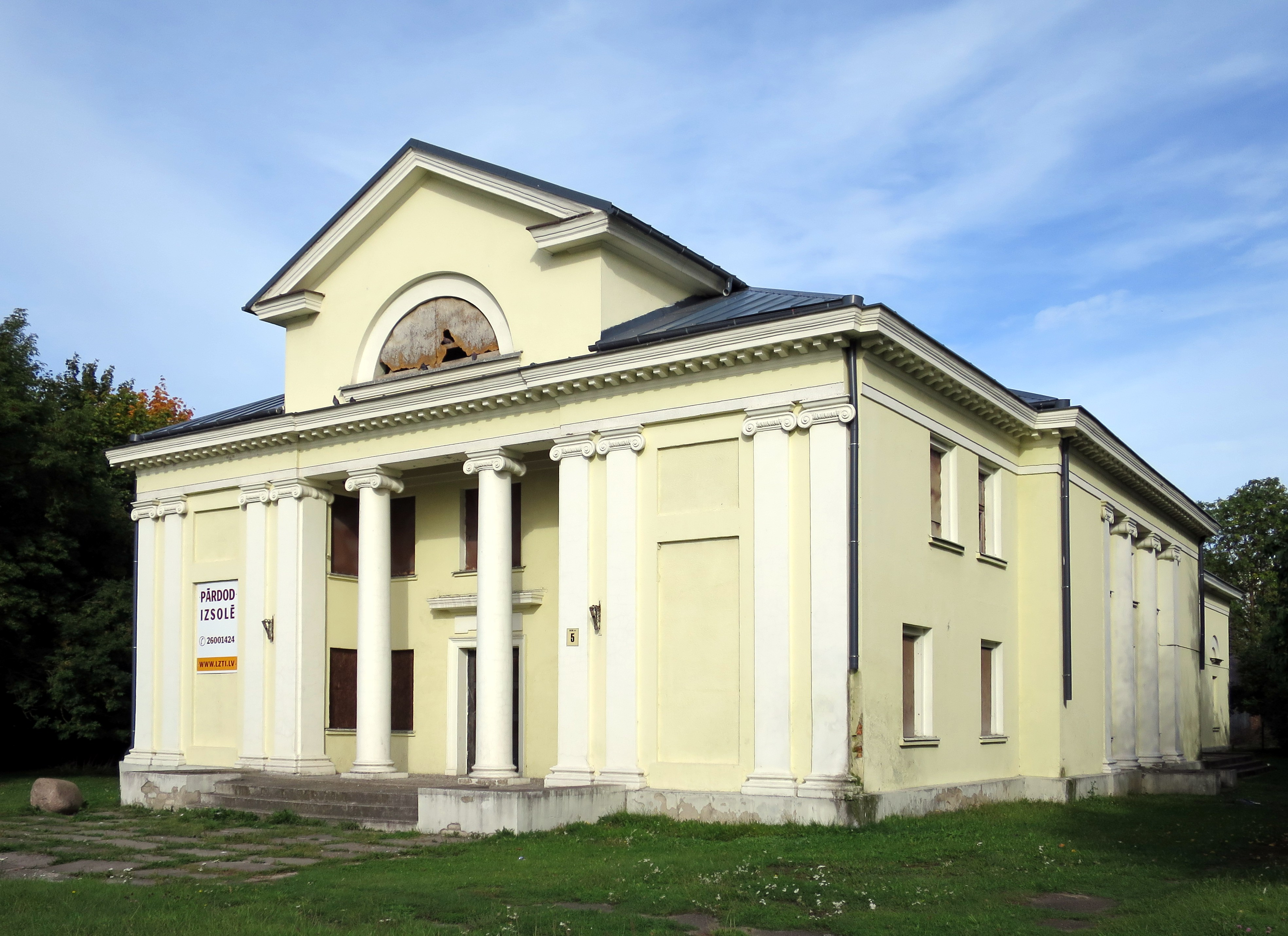
Stalin-era cinema building

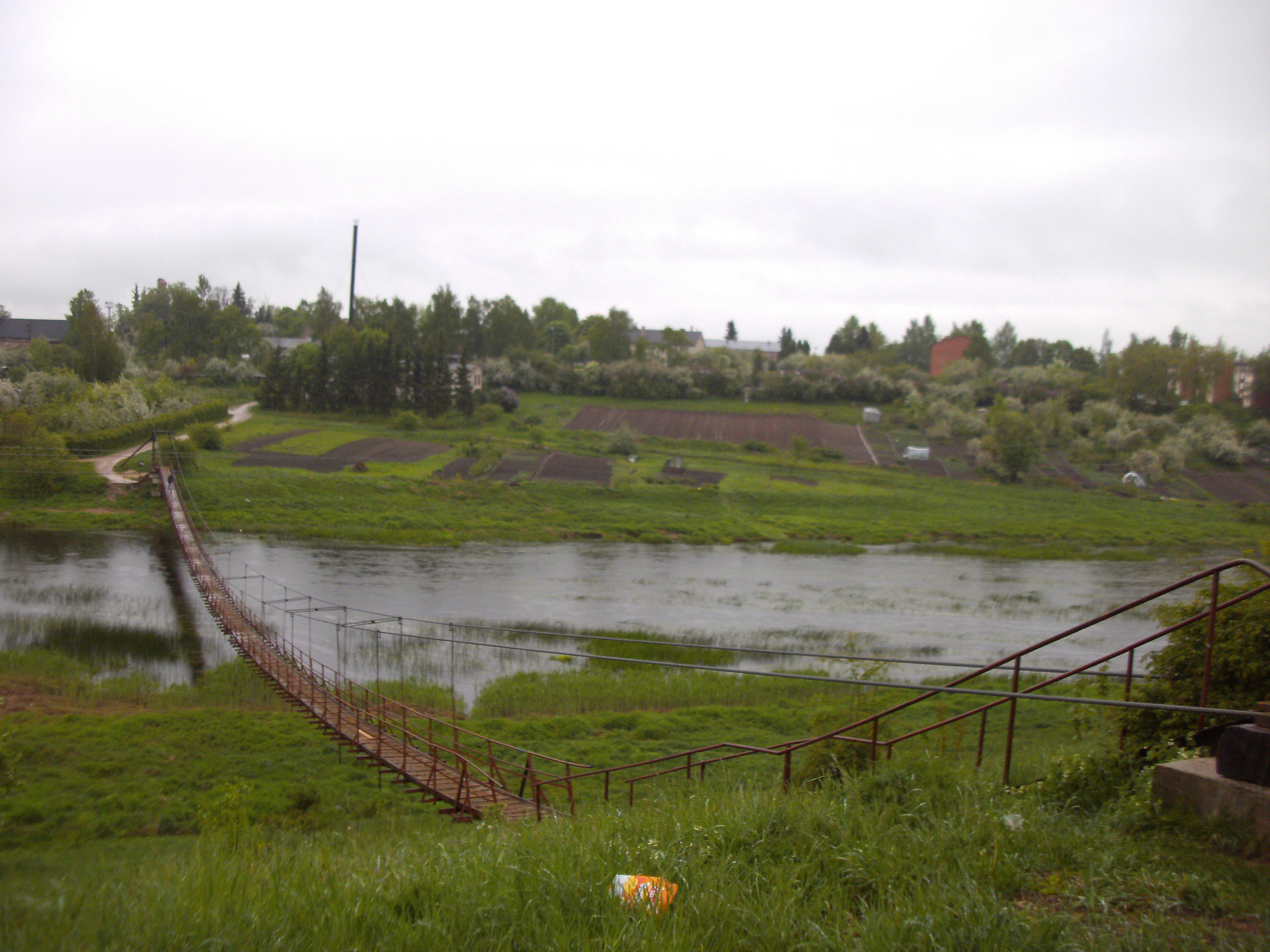
Suspension bridge over Mūsa

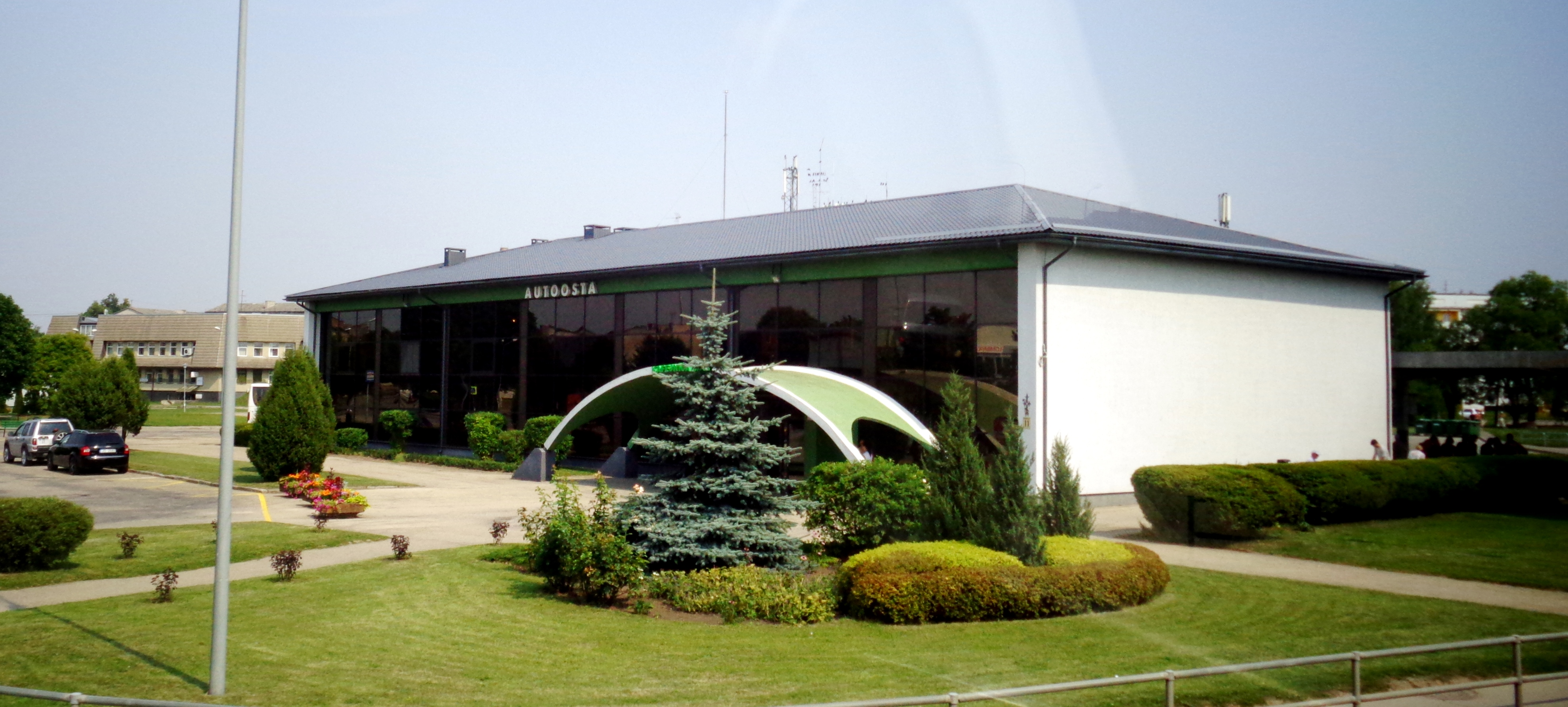
Bauska Bus station

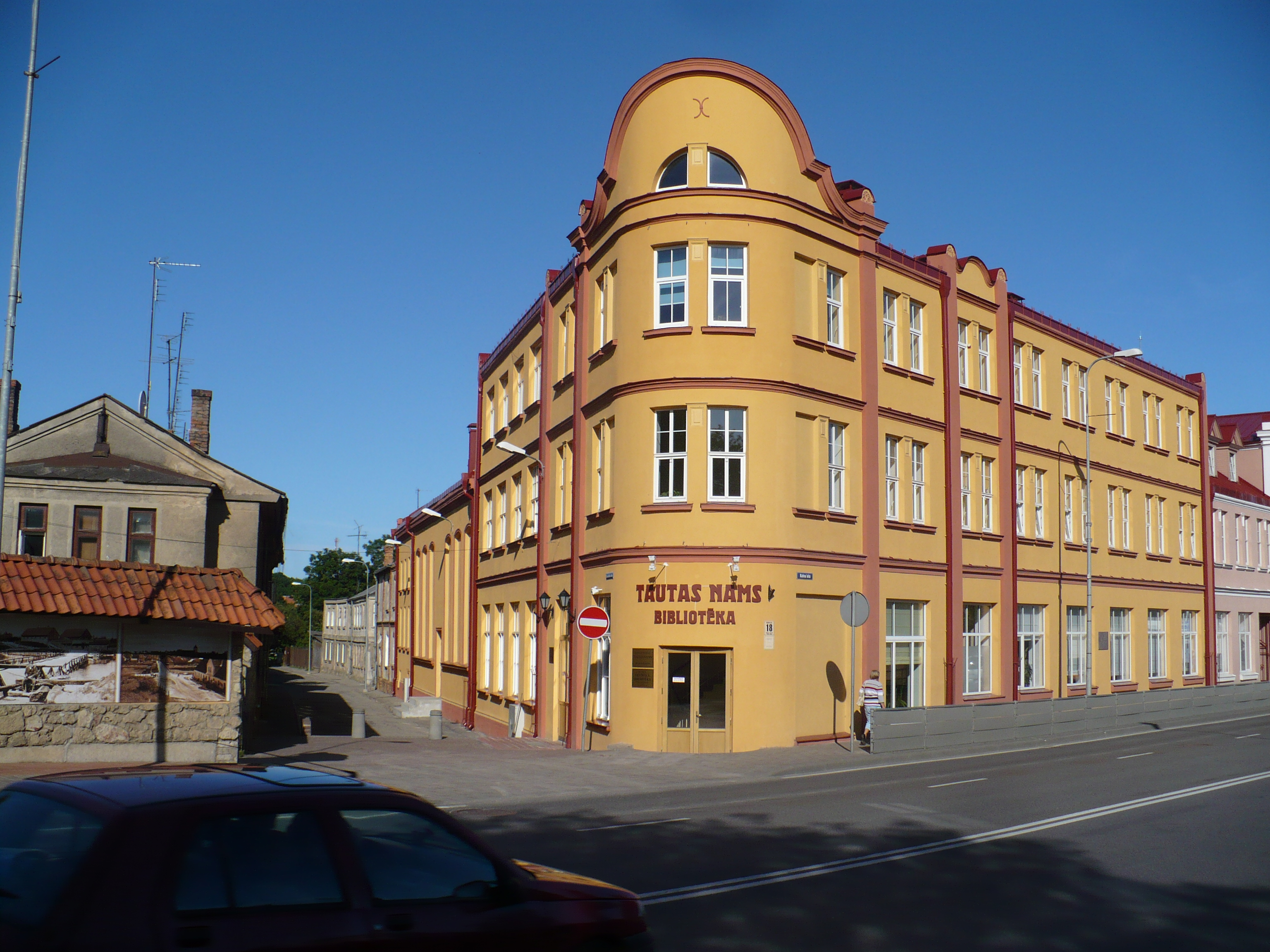
Society house and library

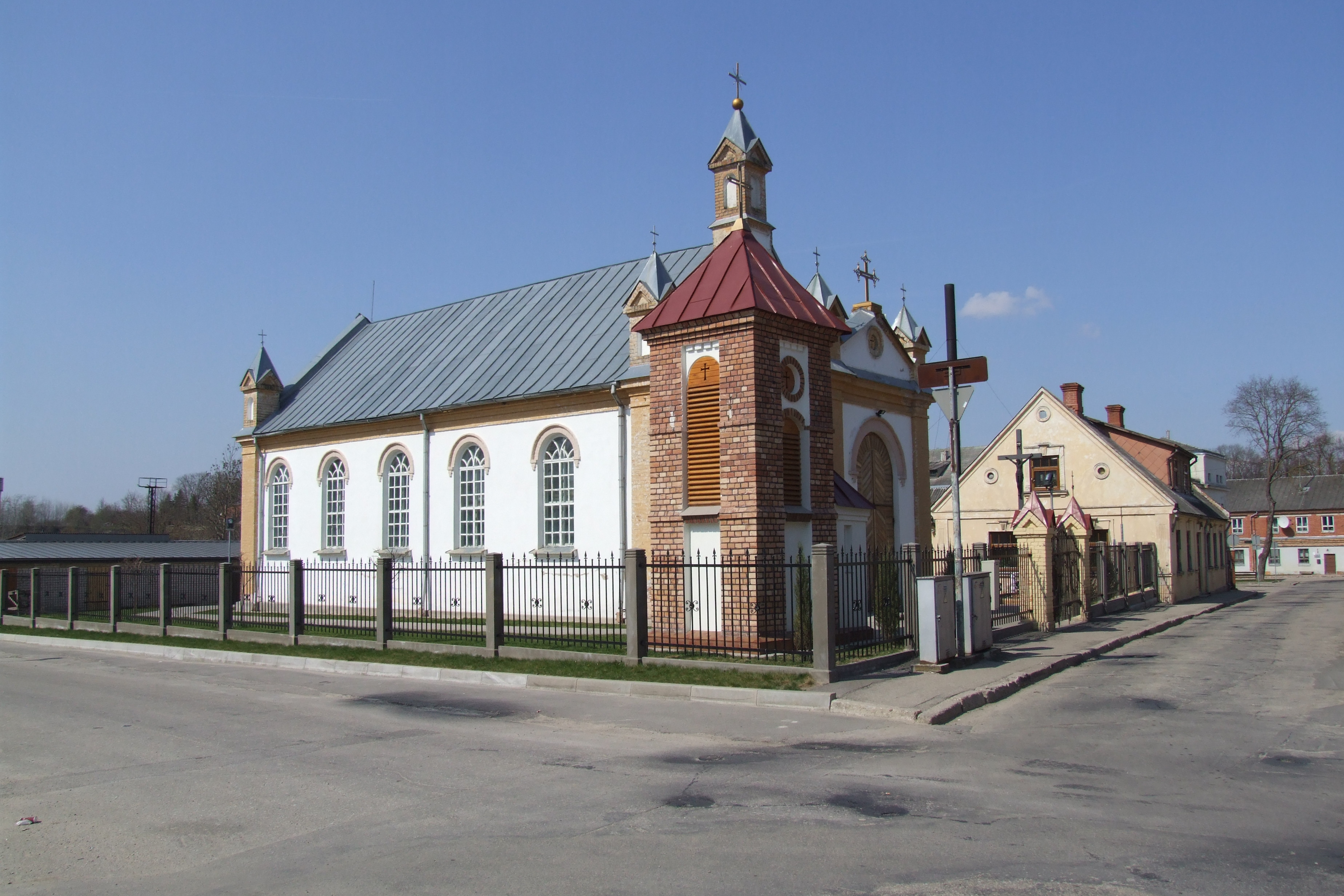
Roman Catholic Church of the Most Holy Sacrament
- Bauska Castle and Museum
- Bauska Church of the Holy Spirit, Lutheran
- Bauska Town Hall
- Bauska Museum
- Bauska Freedom monument
- Church of St. George, Orthodox
- Bauska Church of the Most Holy Sacrament, Catholic
- Stone of Peter the Great
- Riga Motor Museum Bauska's Branch

=== Bauska's Defenders' Monument ===
On September 14, 2012, a monument to the inhabitants of city who organized the defense of Bauska against the Soviet assault in 1944 was unveiled in the city, with inscription "To the defenders of Bauska against the second Soviet occupation on July 28 – September 14, 1944".

== Twin towns – sister cities ==
Bauska is twinned with:

- Hedemora, Sweden
- (Georgia (country)) Khashuri, Georgia
- Náchod, Czech Republic
- Pakruojis, Lithuania
- Radviliškis, Lithuania
- Rypin, Poland
- Soroca, Moldova

== Notable people ==
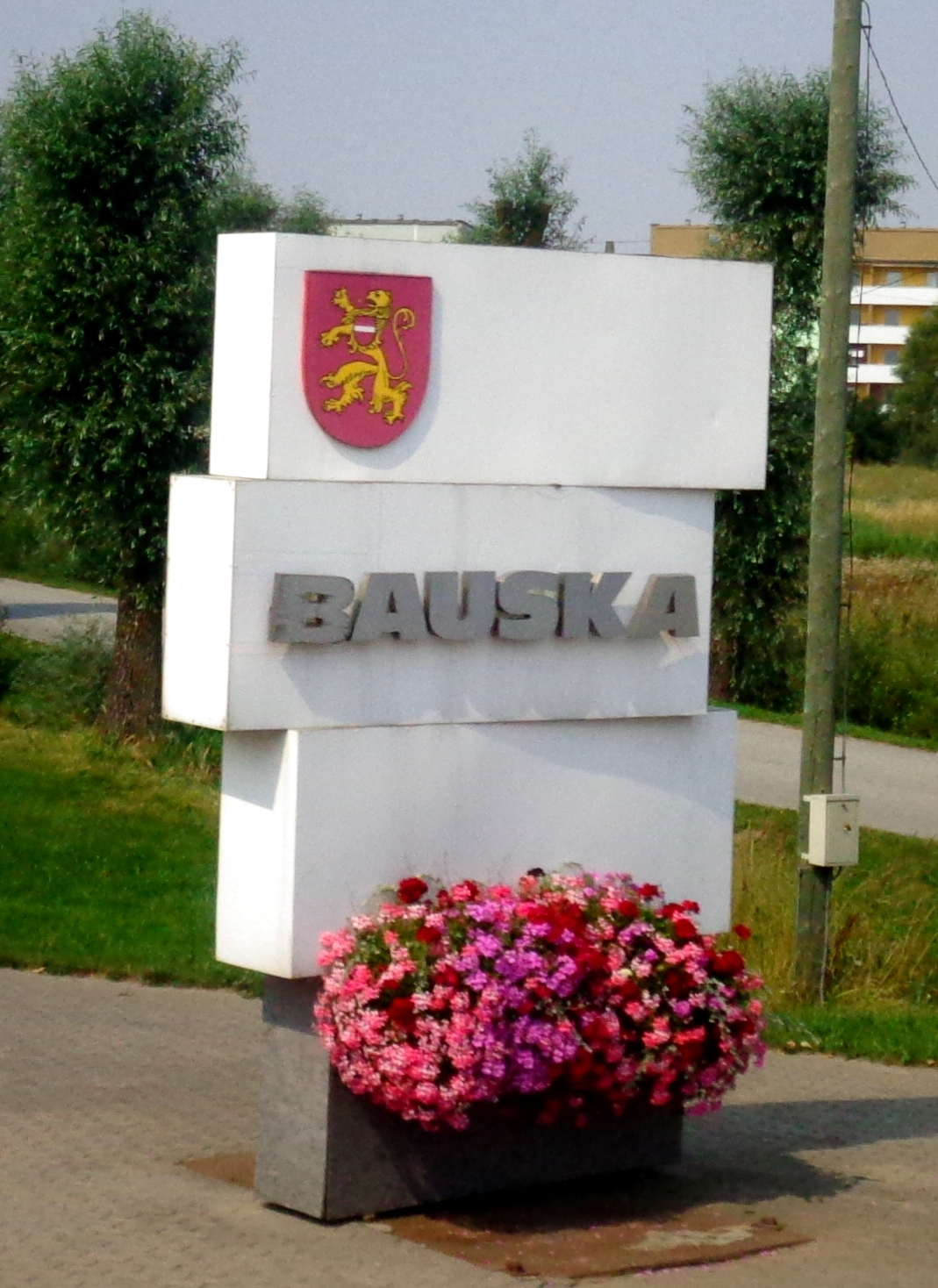
Bauska sign, Latvia

- Karl Constantin Kraukling, (1792–1873), Director of the Royal History Museum, Dresden.
- Arthur Böttcher, (1831–1889), a Baltic German pathologist and anatomist.
- Lazar Nisselovich, (1858–1914), Jewish lawyer, member of the 3rd Russian Duma.
- Abraham Isaac Kook, (1865–1935), Bauska local rabbi, 1894-1904.
- Vilis Olavs, (1867–1917), political theorist and writer, active during Latvian National Awakening.
- Vilis Plūdons, (1874–1940), poet and a rep. of folk romanticism.
- Elchonon Wasserman (1874-1941), rabbi and rosh yeshiva (dean).
- Krišjānis Berķis, (1884–1942), general, Army General Staff
- Artuss Kaimiņš, (born 1980), actor, politician and radio host.
- Kristīne Nevarauska, (born 1981), theatre and film actress.
- Artūrs Toms Plešs, (born 1992), politician, Minister for Environmental Protection and Regional Development

=== Sport ===
- Taiga Kantāne (born 1970), athlete, competed at the 2012 and 2016 Summer Paralympics in the discus and shot put.
- Dainis Kazakevičs, (born 1981), professional football manager.
- Dace Ruskule, (born 1981), discus thrower, competed at the 2004 Summer Olympics
- Dace Lina, (born 1981), marathon runner, competed at the 2012 Summer Olympics
- Ivars Timermanis, (born 1982), basketball player.
- Dainis Upelnieks, (born 1982), sport shooter, competed at the 2016 Summer Olympics
- Mārtiņš Podžus and Jānis Podžus, (born 1994), twins and tennis players.
- Inese Tarvida, (born 1998), taekwondo athlete

== Climate ==
Bauska has a humid continental climate (Köppen Dfb).

Climate data for Bauska (1991-2020 normals, extremes 1945-present)
Month	Jan	Feb	Mar	Apr	May	Jun	Jul	Aug	Sep	Oct	Nov	Dec	Year
Record high °C (°F)	10.5 (50.9)	12.8 (55.0)	19.2 (66.6)	27.2 (81.0)	29.9 (85.8)	32.1 (89.8)	34.5 (94.1)	34.3 (93.7)	30.5 (86.9)	23.7 (74.7)	17.2 (63.0)	11.4 (52.5)	34.5 (94.1)
Mean daily maximum °C (°F)	−0.7 (30.7)	−0.2 (31.6)	4.6 (40.3)	12.2 (54.0)	18.1 (64.6)	21.4 (70.5)	23.9 (75.0)	23.1 (73.6)	17.6 (63.7)	10.6 (51.1)	4.4 (39.9)	0.7 (33.3)	11.3 (52.4)
Daily mean °C (°F)	−3.0 (26.6)	−2.9 (26.8)	0.7 (33.3)	7.0 (44.6)	12.3 (54.1)	15.8 (60.4)	18.3 (64.9)	17.4 (63.3)	12.6 (54.7)	6.9 (44.4)	2.3 (36.1)	−1.2 (29.8)	7.2 (44.9)
Mean daily minimum °C (°F)	−5.7 (21.7)	−6.0 (21.2)	−3.0 (26.6)	1.9 (35.4)	6.2 (43.2)	10.0 (50.0)	12.6 (54.7)	11.7 (53.1)	8.0 (46.4)	3.5 (38.3)	0.1 (32.2)	−3.6 (25.5)	3.0 (37.4)
Record low °C (°F)	−34.6 (−30.3)	−33.9 (−29.0)	−25.1 (−13.2)	−13.0 (8.6)	−4.0 (24.8)	0.4 (32.7)	3.5 (38.3)	1.1 (34.0)	−4.6 (23.7)	−10.8 (12.6)	−20.4 (−4.7)	−33.9 (−29.0)	−34.6 (−30.3)
Average precipitation mm (inches)	38.7 (1.52)	32.6 (1.28)	28.8 (1.13)	35.0 (1.38)	47.5 (1.87)	61.1 (2.41)	80.7 (3.18)	62.8 (2.47)	52.3 (2.06)	60.7 (2.39)	47.1 (1.85)	42.8 (1.69)	590.1 (23.23)
Average precipitation days (≥ 1 mm)	10	8	8	7	8	9	10	10	9	11	10	11	111
Average relative humidity (%)	87.5	85.1	78.6	70.4	68.6	72.7	74.4	75.4	81.0	85.8	89.4	89.4	79.9
Mean monthly sunshine hours	39	68	154	224	297	288	295	268	192	110	39	25	1,999
Source 1: LVĢMC
Source 2: NOAA (precipitation days, humidity 1991-2020)
