= Valmiera Marathon =

Athletics competition in Latvia

- Date: September
- Location: Valmiera, Latvia
- Event type: road
- Distance: Marathon, Half marathon
- Established: 1983
- Course records: Marathon (Latvia) Aigars Fadejevs 2:19:57 (M; 2008) (Latvia) Dace Lina 2:50:14 (F; 2010)
- Website: http://www.valmieras-maratons.lv/

Valmiera Marathon is an annual road marathon, held in Valmiera, Latvia. It is also the Latvian championship in marathon.

== Winners ==
=== Marathon ===
Key: Course record

Year	Men's winner	Nationality	Time (h:m:s)	Women's winner	Nationality	Time (h:m:s)
2018	Dmitrijs Serjogins	Latvia	2:22:14	Jekaterina Sokunova	Latvia	3:03:23
2017	Dmitrijs Serjogins	Latvia	2:24:32	Liene Neimane	Latvia	3:05:40
2016	Anatolijs Macuks	Latvia	2:28:31	Viviana Kirilova	Latvia	3:12:34
2015	Kristaps Bērziņš	Latvia	2:29:49	Kitija Valtere	Latvia	2:57:04
2014	Rolands Kaimiņš	Latvia	2:30:39	Jolanta Liepiņa	Latvia	3:08:46
2013	Kristaps Bērziņš	Latvia	2:30:36	Dace Lina	Latvia	2:55:06
2012	Aigars Fadejevs	Latvia	2:35:45	Anita Kažemāka	Latvia	2:52:00
2011	Raivis Zaķis	Latvia	2:30:54	Irīna Štūla-Pankoka	Latvia	3:08:27
2010	Māris Ābele	Latvia	2:35:56	Dace Lina	Latvia	2:50:14
2009	Mareks Florošeks	Latvia	2:26:01	Irīna Štūla-Pankoka	Latvia	3:00:18
2008	Aigars Fadejevs	Latvia	2:19:57	Irīna Štūla-Pankoka	Latvia	3:04:38
2007	Modris Liepiņš	Latvia	2:46:21	Anita Liepiņa	Latvia	3:10:19
1996	Not Available					
1995	Not Available					
1989	Not Available					
1988	Not Available					
1987	Normunds Fedotovskis	Soviet Union	2:38:40	Ruta Svilāne	Soviet Union	3:22:16
1986	Zints Vigulis	Soviet Union	2:36:47	Ruta Svilāne	Soviet Union	3:16:00
1985	Georgs Jermolajevs	Soviet Union	2:36:05	Tamāra Merzļikina	Soviet Union	3:09:13
1984	Georgs Jermolajevs	Soviet Union	2:38:17	Tamāra Merzļikina	Soviet Union	3:12:06
1983	Juris Beļinskis	Soviet Union	2:42:55	Not held		

=== Half marathon ===
Key: Course record

Year	Men's winner	Nationality	Time (h:m:s)	Women's winner	Nationality	Time (h:m:s)
2018	Jānis Višķers	Latvia	1:09:32	Vaida Žūsinaite	Lithuania	1:19:29
2017	Valērijs Žolnerovičs	Latvia	1:08:45	Ilona Marhele	Latvia	1:20:42
2016	Jānis Višķers	Latvia	1:10:03	Lelde Neimande	Latvia	1:24:55
2015	Jānis Višķers	Latvia	1:07:39	Ariana Hilborna	Latvia	1:17:40
2014	Dmitrijs Serjogins	Latvia	1:09:33	Jeļena Ābele	Latvia	1:18:12
2013	Jānis Višķers	Latvia	1:08:34	Anita Kažemāka	Latvia	1:20:59
2012	Artūras Meška	Lithuania	1:11:57	Gyte Norgiliene	Lithuania	1:23:35
2011	Renārs Roze	Latvia	1:09:19	Poļina Jeļizarova	Latvia	1:18:14
2010	Mareks Florošeks	Latvia	1:11:19	Ilona Marhele	Latvia	1:23:48
