= 2020 Latvian Athletics Championships =

- Edition: 30th
- Dates: 8–9 August
- Host city: Jelgava, Latvia
- Venue: Zemgale Olympic Center
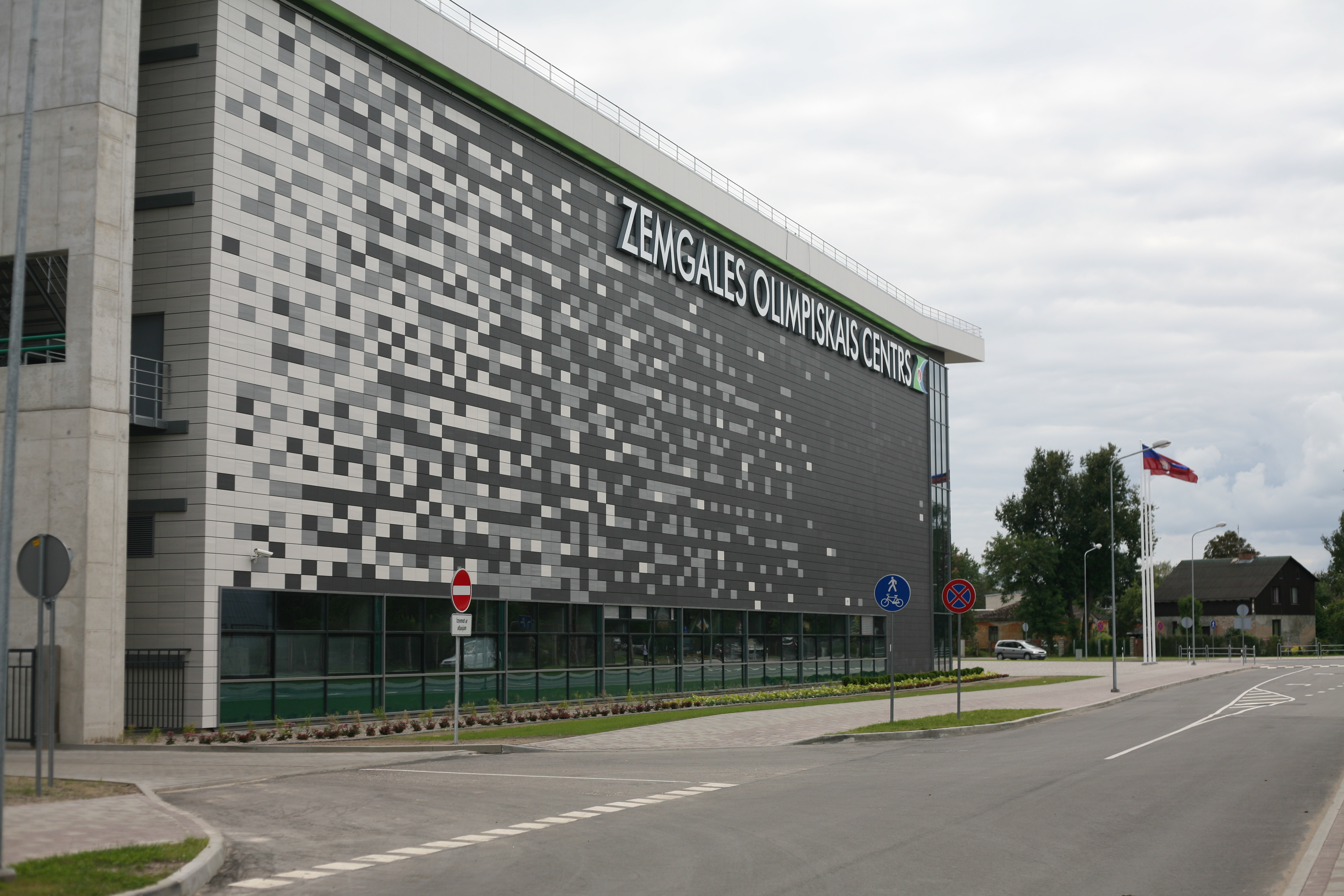
- Events: 42

The 2020 Latvian Athletics Championships (Latvian: Latvijas čempionāts vieglatlētikā 2020) was the 30th edition of the national outdoor track and field championships for Latvia. It took place from 8–9 August at Zemgale Olympic Center in Jelgava. The 10,000 metres championships were contested separately in Piltene on 4 July.

== Results ==
=== Men ===
Event	Gold		Silver		Bronze	
100 metres	Emīls Kristofers Jonāss	10.74 s	Valērijs Valinščikovs	10.78 s	Jānis Mezītis	10.86 s
200 metres	Iļja Petrušenko	21.90 s	Oskars Grava	22.07 s	Mikus Pētersons	22.44 s
400 metres	Artūrs Pastors	47.39 s	Maksims Sinčukovs	47.72 s	Iļja Petrušenko	48.63 s
800 metres	Maksims Sinčukovs	1:50.06 min	Austris Karpinskis	1:52.05 min	Jānis Razgalis	1:52.89 min
1500 metres	Jānis Razgalis	3:54.68 min	Arnis Ozoliņš	3:55.28 min	Rojs Puks	3:56.21 min
5000 metres	Uģis Jocis	14:53.25 min	Artūrs Niklāvs Medveds	15:21.48 min	Arnis Ozoliņš	15:37.43 min
10,000 metres	Uģis Jocis	30:03.26 min	Reinis Hartmanis	33:03.04 min	Artūrs Niklāvs Medveds	31:40.61 min
110 m hurdles	Kristaps Sunteiks	15.30 s	Armands Buivids	15.35 s	Kārlis Sondors	15.41 s
400 m hurdles	Dmitrijs Ļašenko	53.98 s	Dmitrijs Ļašenko	57.21 s	Reinis Rozenbahs	58.85 s
3000 m steeplechase	Alberts Blajs	9:09.75 min	Artūrs Niklāvs Medveds	9:23.45 min	Andrejs Bānis	10:02.41 min
10,000 m walk	Raivo Saulgriezis	42:47.70 min	Ruslans Smolonskis	43:55.92 min	Normunds Ivzāns	45:42.20 min
4 × 100 metres relay	Daugavpils ind.sporta veidu skola Ņikita Ivanovs; Erlends Gipters; Etjens Viktors Beļašovs; Aleksandrs Visockis	43.69 s	Bauskas BJSS; Aksels Griba; Mārtiņš Rūgums; Kristiāns Lauva; Kristaps Sunteiks	44.33 s	SS "Arkādija"; Maksims Pjazings; Mikus Saldovers; Oskars Grava; Dainis Aleidzāns	45.49 s
4 × 400 metres relay	Liepājas SSS; Dmitrijs Ļašenko; Rojs Puks; Iļja Petrušenko; Ralfs Roga	3:26.34 min	Daugavpils ind.sporta veidu skola Ņikita Bogdanovs; Jurijs Kravčonoks; Aleksandrs Visockis; Etjens Viktors Beļašovs	3:27.89 min	Daugavpils nov./VK "Olimpija"; Vilmārs Settarovs; Elvis Ancāns; Jānis Soms; Kaspars Bebrišs	4:13.01 min
High jump	Rihards Vaivads	2.05 m	Edvarts Eglītis	2.01 m	Pēteris Krauja	1.96 m
Pole vault	Mareks Ārents	5.10 m	Jurijs Avsiščers	4.30 m	Niks Samauskis	3.75 m
Long jump	Sandis Dzenītis	7.10 m	Pēteris Pauls Vīksne	7.01 m	Rinalds Smilga	6.89 m
Triple jump	Rinalds Smilga	14.57 m	Armands Aivis Gorbačovs	15.36 m	Dāvis Kalniņš	14.27 m
Shot put	Māris Urtāns	15.72 m	Edgars Berķis	15.32 m	Arnis Žviriņš	15.04 m
Discus throw	Oskars Vaisjūns	49.29 m	Arnis Žviriņš	47.95 m	Aleksandrs Volkovs	44.75 m
Hammer throw	Igors Sokolovs	60.81 m	Makars Korotkovs	60.75 m	Eļčins Gasanovs	56.03 m
Javelin throw	Gatis Čakšs	83.80 m	Jānis Svens Grīva	70.24 m	Matīss Velps	69.70 m

=== Women ===
Event	Gold		Silver		Bronze	
100 metres	Sindija Bukša	11.73 s	Līga Vecbērza	11.99 s	Anna Paula Auziņa	12.43 s
200 metres	Sindija Bukša	23.73 s	Amanda Hilda Gromova	24.86 s	Luīze Dārta Sietiņa	25.20 s
400 metres	Patricija Cīrule	56.37 s	Paula Katrīna Skalberga	58.12 s	Viktorija Osipenko	58.34 s
800 metres	Līga Velvere	2:02.85 min	Patricija Cīrule	2:11.68 min	Invida Mauriņa	2:13.79 min
1500 metres	Kamilla Vanadziņa	4:33.26 min	Elēna Miezava	4:34.47 min	Rebeka Draudiņa	5:03.54 min
5000 metres	Karīna Helmane-Soročenkova	17:01.60 min	Agate Caune	18:11.83 min	Gundega Heidingere	18:29.45 min
10,000 metres	Karīna Helmane-Soročenkova	35:45.38 min	Kitija Valtere	38:25.69 min	Madara Frēliha	40:37.83 min
100 m hurdles	Marta Marksa	13.97 s	Kristīne Blaževiča	14.16 s	Paula Sprudzāne	14.73 s
400 m hurdles	Madara Lungeviča	62.67 s	Patrīcija Sarmule	63.28 s	Viviena Vita Volbeta	66.17 s
3000 m steeplechase	Alīna Sokunova	11:27.77 min	Anna Marija Petrakova	11:33.98 min	Solveiga Ozola-Ozoliņa	12:07.17 min
10,000 m walk	Modra Ignate	52:15.21 min	Agnese Pastare	56:55.45 min	Elīna Lāce	59:36.95 min
4 × 100 metres relay	BJC IK "Auseklis"; Asnāte Kalniņa; Anna Paula Auziņa; Paula Katrīna Skalberga; Sindija Bukša	46.95 s	SS "Arkādija"; Evija Šēfere; Alevtina Gūtmane; Marija Ševcova; Jeļizaveta Romaņenko	48.54 s	Jēkabpils SS; Zane Zemīte; Lāsma Zemīte; Ieva Ivanova; Kristīne Ivanova	48.62 s
4 × 400 metres relay	Daugavpils ind.sporta veidu skola Viktorija Popovičeva; Jūlija Soldatenkova; Elīna Gumarova; Anastasija Kisele	4:11.34 min	Liepājas SSS; Alise Šterna; Mērija Megija Zabe; Annija Ārberga; Amina Askarova	4:22.32 min	Only two finishing teams	
High jump	Lāsma Zemīte	1.80 m	Solvita Dzilnava	1.76 m	Darja Sopova	1.74 m
Pole vault	Ildze Bortaščenoka	3.75 m	Sonija Aškinezere	3.65 m	Anete Jete Meiere	3.15 m
Long jump	Rūta Kate Lasmane	6.10 m	Ieva Turķe	5.99 m	Kitija Paula Melnbārde	5.81 m
Triple jump	Rūta Kate Lasmane	13.82 m	Darja Sopova	12.54 m	Zane Zemīte	12.50 m
Shot put	Linda Ozola	14.18 m	Anna Gulbe	13.90 m	Lāsma Padedze	13.09 m
Discus throw	Inga Miķelsone-Leimane	45.70 m	Vineta Krūmiņa	44.76 m	Dace Šteinerte	43.96 m
Hammer throw	Elva Vestarta	46.20 m	Liene Roziņa	45.56 m	Kristiāna Poļakova	45.14 m
Javelin throw	Līna Mūze	60.10 m	Madara Palameika	58.70 m	Anete Kociņa	58.58 m
