= Bauska Town Hall =

Building in Latvia

Coordinates: 56°24′36″N 24°11′08″E

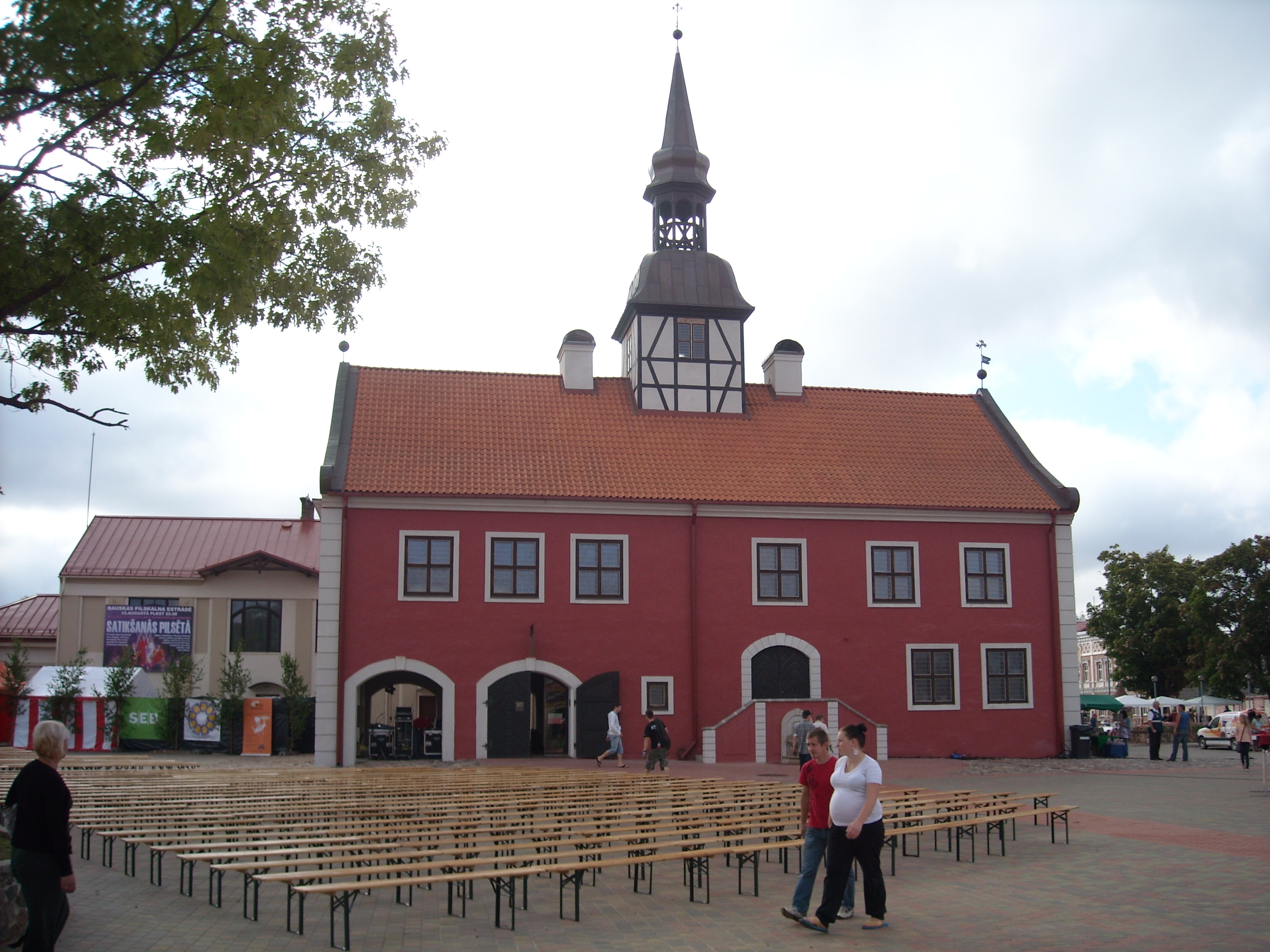
Bauska Town Hall, 2013

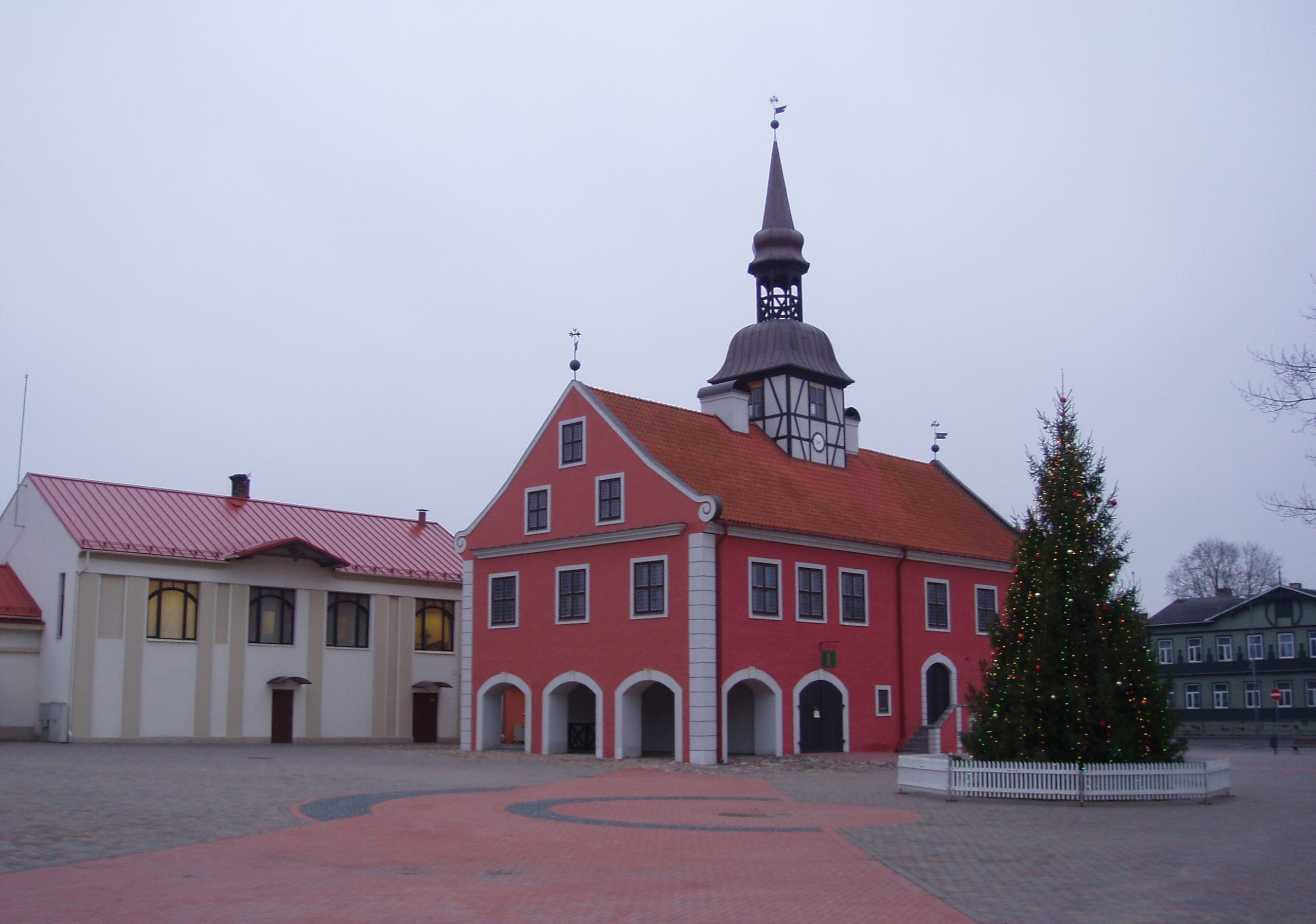
Bauska Town Hall, 2014

Bauska Town Hall is a recently rebuilt 17th-century town hall building located in the middle of the Market Square in Bauska, Latvia.

== History ==
In 1609 Duke Friedrich Kettler granted the new city of Bauska a city seal and this is considered as the year of gaining full city rights. In 1615 the duke allowed Bauska to build a town hall building. An existing stone building in the center of the Market Square was enlarged by 12 feet for this purpose, it gained a second floor built in a timber framing style and a tower steeple. Two decorative wooden staircases led to the second floor. Construction was completed in 1616. During 17th century Bauska Town Hall was the largest in the Duchy of Courland and Semigallia.

The Town Hall basement was used for storing wine, while the first floor was used for the official city weight room and the living quarters for the Town Hall's servant. The hall on the second floor was used for the city Council work and meetings.

By the 18th century the arcade on the eastern side of the building was bricked in, and the space used by firefighters to store their equipment.

By the middle of 19th century the town hall building fell into disrepair. In 1852 the steeple and tower were demolished. In 1871 the second floor was dismantled as well. The remaining building was no longer used by the municipality and rented out for commercial use. New surrounding buildings were built on the Market Square and by the middle of the 20th century the old Town Hall was virtually forgotten.

== Restoration ==
In the 1980s projects were drawn-up for the restoration of the Town Hall. During the economic and political upheavals that ended with the restoration of Latvia's independence, the project was shelved, but in early 2000s Market square was cleared from many buildings and the reconstruction work began. The rebuilt town hall building was completed in 2011. In 2013 a drinking water fountain and a clock on the tower facade were installed. Interior design work continued until 2014. The building is open to the public, it houses a museum and the Bauska tourist information center.
