= Vilis Olavs =

Latvian political theorist, writer, and humanitarian

- Born: 18 May 1867; Bauska, Russian Empire, (now, Latvia)
- Died: 29 March 1917 (aged 49); Vyborg, Grand Duchy of Finland, Russian Empire
- Occupation(s): Writer; Political theorist Humanitarian
- Children: Vilis Olavs (1902-1944)

Vilis Olavs (born Vilis Plute; 18 May 1867 – 29 March 1917) was a Latvian political theorist, writer, and humanitarian who participated in the First Latvian National Awakening of the 19th century.

== Biography ==
Vilis Olavs was born as Vilis Plute on 18 May 1867 in Bauska, Latvia, which was then part of the Russian Empire, to local farmers. His surname changed to Olavs in 1890. Olavs graduated from the University of Tartu in 1892 with a degree in theology, and from 1895 to 1897 he taught in Riga, but was banned from lecturing after expressing his liberal views. In the meantime, he continued his studies for several years at the Riga Technical University, until founding his own private school of commerce for young women in Riga, 1904.

Olavs was very active in Latvian politics, especially well known for his writings and social commentary on Latvian society and the First Latvian National Awakening. In the National Awakening, Latvian nationalism and the desire for self determination began to emerge. Against them stood the German gentry, who had controlled all social and economic affairs in the Baltic since the 13th century. As a student, Olavs published a prize-winning essay in which he called for peaceful opposition of the German gentry. Further writings and editings of his included "Latvju vēsturi līdz 12. gadsimta beigām" ("Latvian History up to the end of the 12th century") and "Sēta, Daba, Pasaule" ("The Farmstead, Nature, and The Earth"). In the 1890s, Olavs was an active member of the Latvian Society of Riga, and in 1896 he organized the first-ever, Latvian ethnographic exhibit. As the editor of several journals, such as "Baltija" (published in St Petersburg), his commentary was widely read by the Latvian population.

For his support of the 1905 Russian Revolution, the Russian Imperial government tried Olavs and sentenced him to endure a year in prison. Olavs wrote "Galvenos virzienus ētikā" (Today's Trends in Ethics) while in prison (1908–1909), a sharp jab against those responsible for his incarceration.

During World War I Olavs helped the Latvian nation in the time of its greatest need. As the war rolled over Eastern Europe, Olavs organized and assumed chairmanship of the Latvian Refugee Central Committee, giving aid to hundreds of Latvian refugees in Russia. Olavs died in sanatorium in Vyborg, Finland in 1917, and was re-buried at the Forest Cemetery in Riga in 1921, where a monument was built in his honor in 1927.
