= Bauska Church of the Holy Spirit =

Church building in Latvia

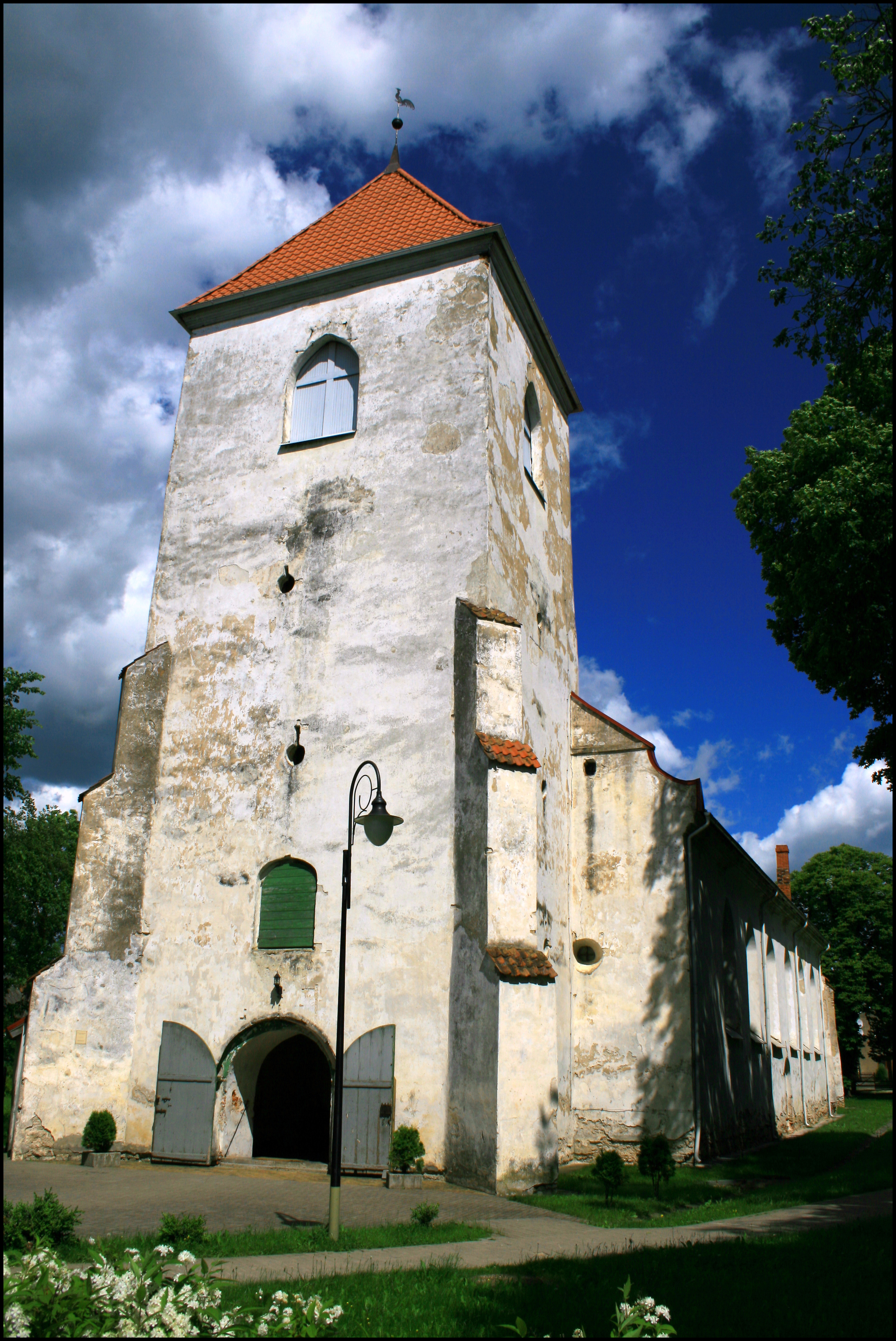
- Bauska Church of the Holy Spirit
- 56.4069°N 24.1864°E
- Location: Bauska
- Country: Latvia
- Denomination: Lutheran

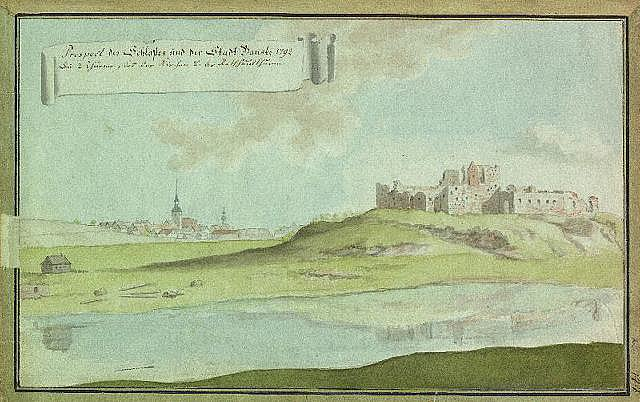
Church's tower is clearly visible in this painting of Bauska Castle ruins, 1792

Church of the Holy Spirit is a Lutheran church and the oldest existing building in Bauska, Latvia. Built between 1591 and 1594 for the needs of the city's Baltic German population. The original building did not have a tower, which was built in 1614 and completed in 1623 by master craftsman Michael Ulrich from Arnstadt who built cupola and high steeple tower. In 1799 the steeple was ruined by a direct lightning strike and the tower was covered by a temporary wooden structure. In 1815 the damaged tower was hit by a lightning once again and the temporary four-sloped roof become permanent.

The pews are carved in the mid-17th century and early 19th century. One of the pews carved in 1640 displays Bauska coat of arms - golden lion on a red shield. The wooden altar was carved in 1699, but heavily refurbished in 1861 by Julius Döring. The pulpit (1762) and the organ prospect (1766) are gifts from the Russian senator Nikolaus Friedrich von Korff.

The church is currently located in the old town of Bauska in the preserved park.

== Memorials ==
On the northern wall is a memorial to City Mayor K.J. Reimers (1757). Epitaph on the southern wall is in memory of the Court Fogt Joachim Henning (1677), painted by D. von Zeitz, who had successful life in Bauska - alderman in 1682, Fogt of the Court in 1702 and even mayor in 1704.

Before 1904 church had seven painted memorials, which was then the highest number in Latvia. On that year they were removed and put in storage where most of them perished. The memorials dedicated to Johann Georg Wittig aus Ohrdruff and his wife Elisabeth Magdalena Hering (1672) depicted the blind Tobit led by the angel Raphael, with patron portraits painted on the frame. The memorial to the City Council member Gotthard Vicke and Anna Koch (1672) showed a scene of Entombment of Christ. Johann Moller's and Elisabeth Pogg's memorial (1694) depicted the Resurrection of Christ. Nicolaus von Brunnow's and Maria von Schoppingk's epitaph (1677) with the Crucifixion scene depicted the Brunnow family members at the foot of the cross. City Mayor Daniel Buchholtz's memorial (1676) featured a dedication at the centre and his portrait and coat of arms on the frame.

In recent years there have been some renovation works around the church with the Church having a roof restoration and paint work on the outside walls.

== Gallery ==
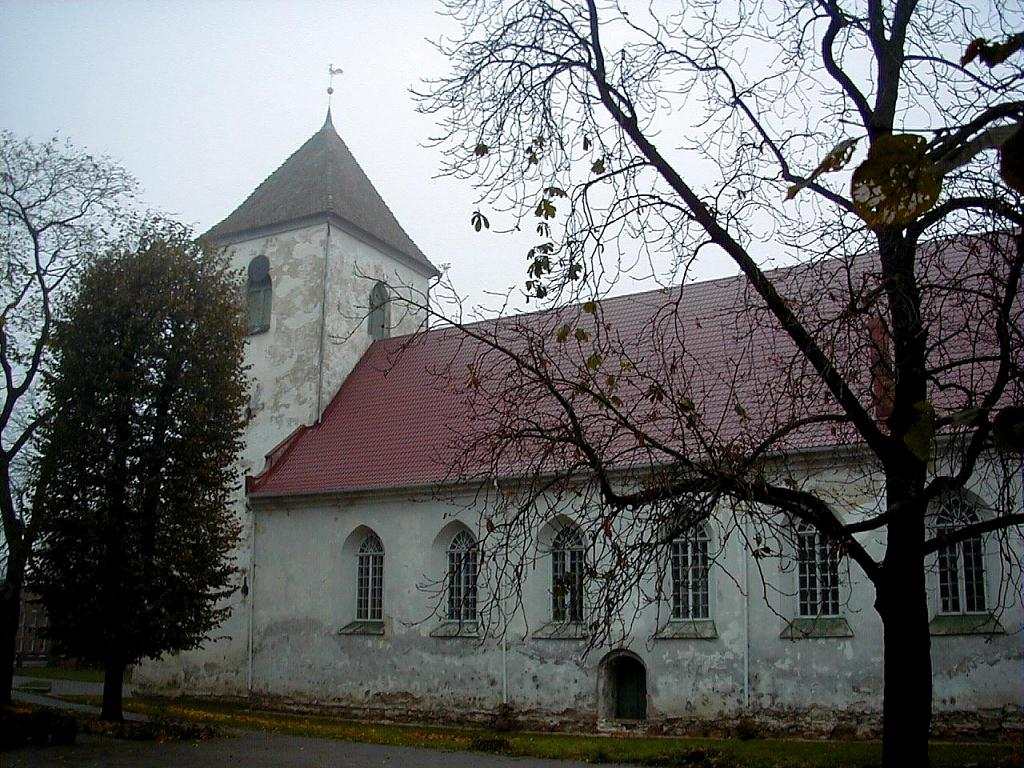
Church in 2001

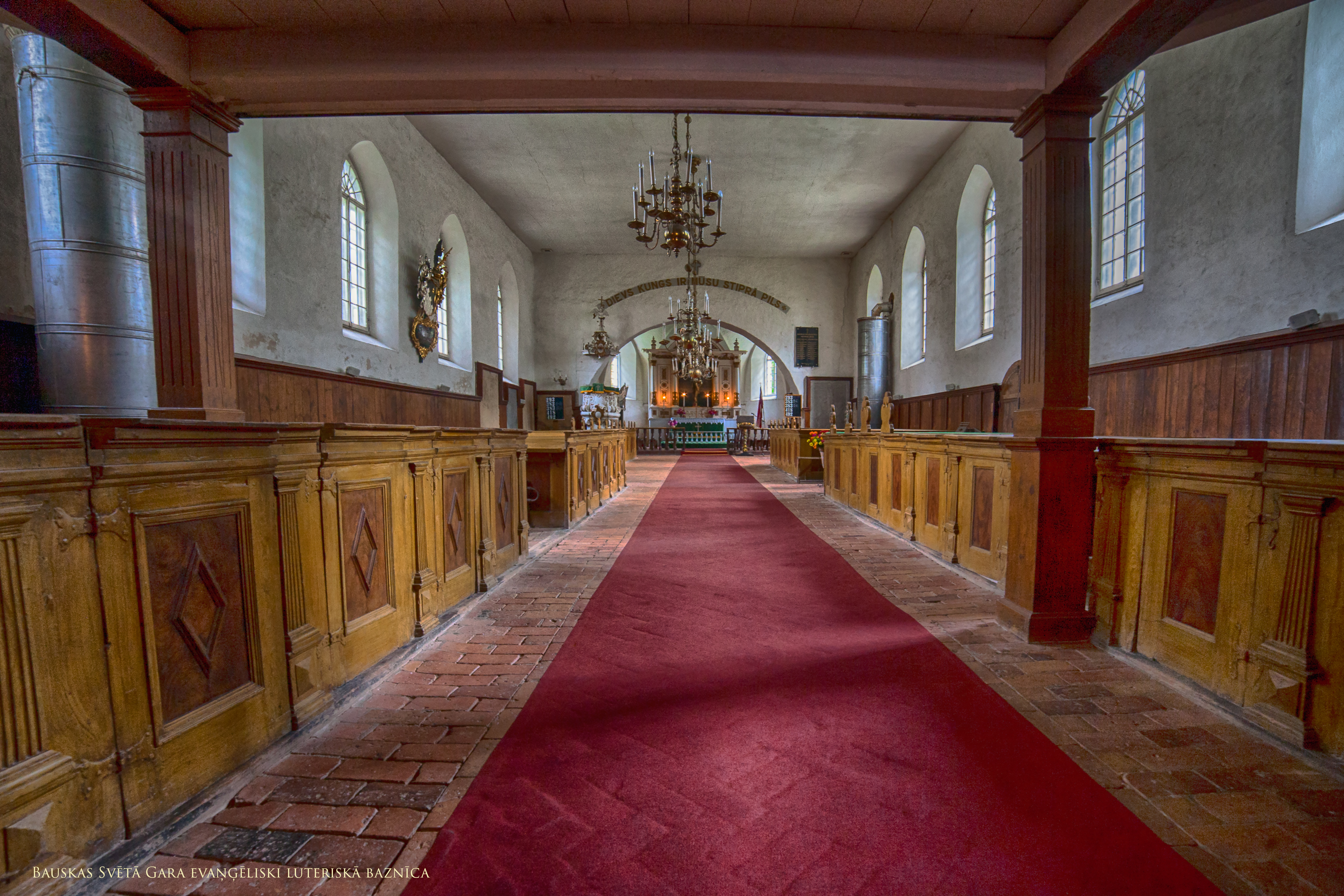
Inside view

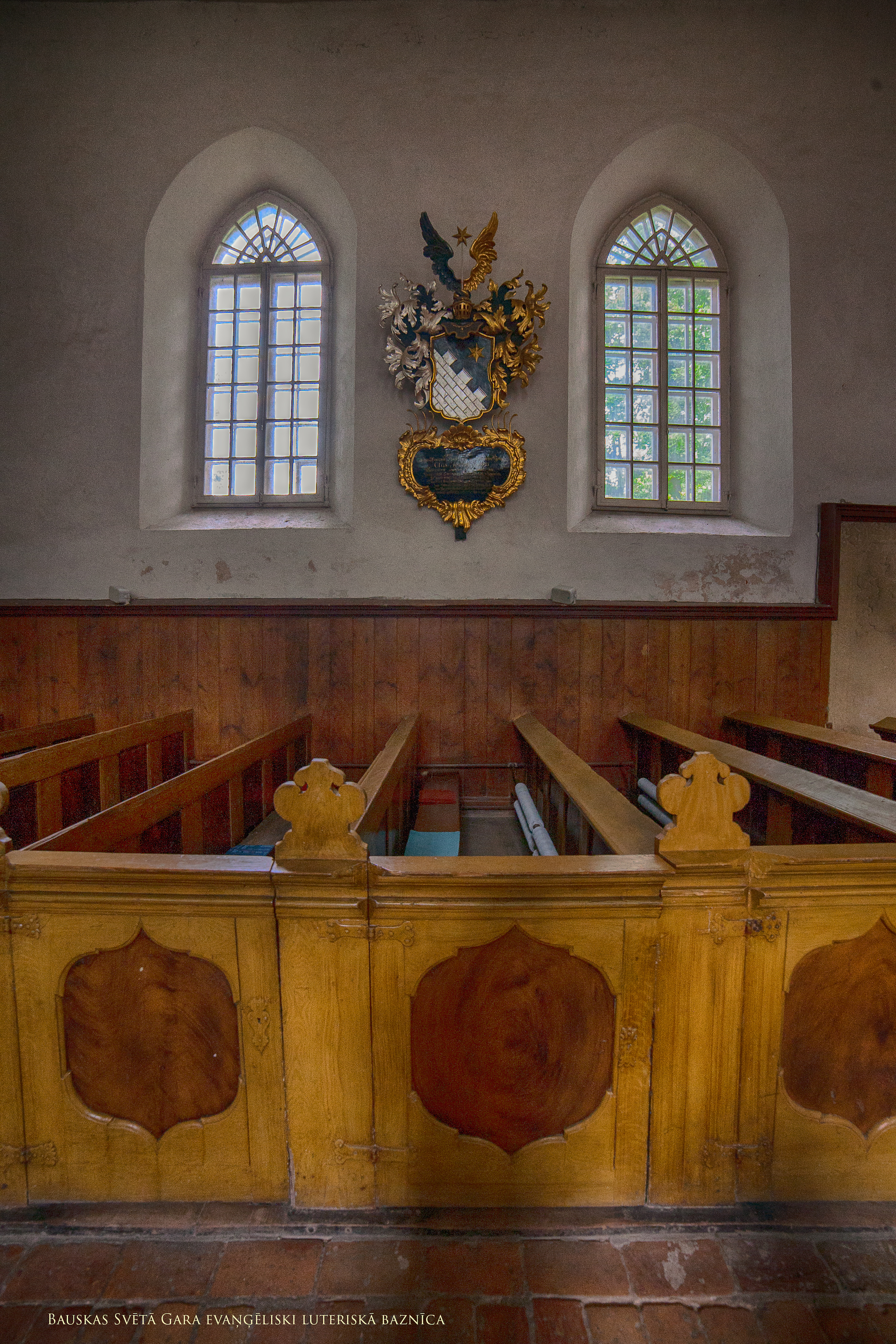
Memorial of Reimers

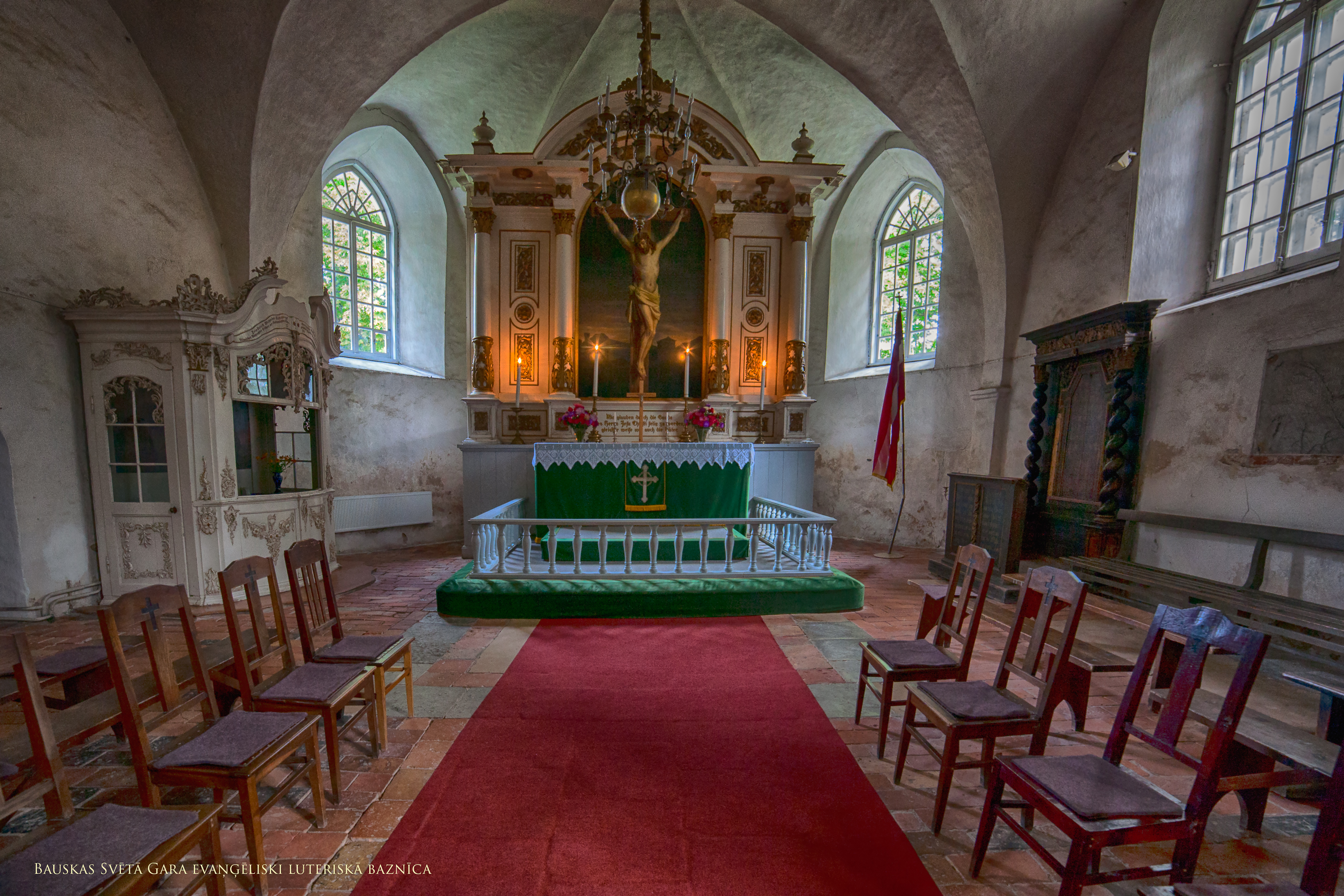
View of the altar
