= Latvian Athletics Championships =

Latvian Athletics Championships (Latvian: Latvijas čempionāts vieglatlētikā) is the national championships in athletics, organized by Latvian Athletics Union.

== Championships ==
- 1991
- 1992
- 1993
- 1994
- 1995
- 1996
- 1997
- 1998
- 1999
- 2000
- 2001
- 2002
- 2003
- 2004
- 2005
- 2006
- 2007
- 2008, Valmiera
- 2009, Ventspils
- 2010, Jēkabpils
- 2011
- 2012
- 2013
- 2014
- 2015
- 2016
- 2017
- 2018
- 1999
- 2020, Jelgava

== Events ==
Men

- 100 m
- 200 m
- 400 m
- 800 m
- 1500 m
- 3000 m
- 5000 m
- 110 m hurdles
- 400 m hurdles
- 3000 m steeplechase
- Half marathon
- Marathon
- High Jump
- Pole Vault
- Long Jump
- Triple Jump
- Shot Put
- Discus Throw
- Javelin Throw
- Hammer Throw
- 4 × 100 m
- 4 × 400 m

Women

- 100 m
- 200 m
- 400 m
- 800 m
- 1500 m
- 3000 m
- 5000 m
- 100 m hurdles
- 400 m hurdles
- 3000 m steeplechase
- Half marathon
- Marathon
- High Jump
- Pole Vault
- Long Jump
- Triple Jump
- Shot Put
- Discus Throw
- Javelin Throw
- Hammer Throw
- 4 × 100 m
- 4 × 400 m
