= List of palaces and manor houses in Latvia =

This is a list of palaces and manor houses in Latvia built after the 16th century. This list does not include castles, which are listed in a separate article. There are currently about 600 surviving manors in Latvia.

== Kurzeme ==
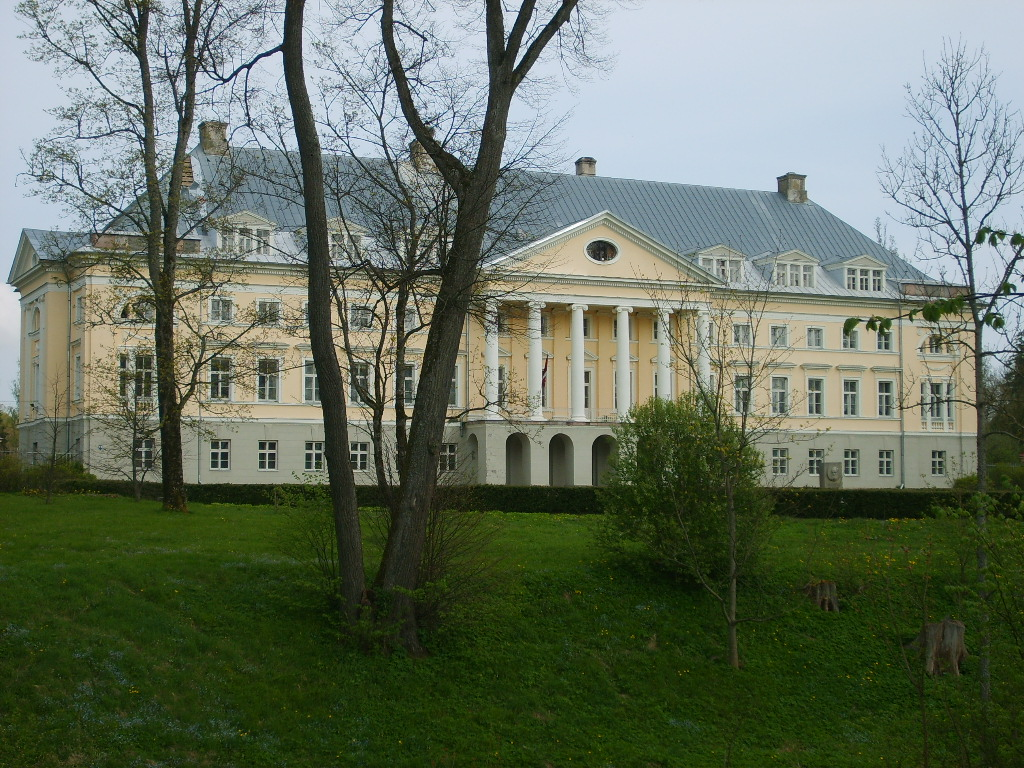
Kazdanga palace

Name	Parish	Municipality	Established	Status	Notes	Refs
Aistere manor	Tadaiķi parish	South Kurzeme Municipality	19th century	Preserved	During the Soviet occupation, the building housed apartments, a shop, and a post office	
Aizvīķi manor	Aizvīķi parish	South Kurzeme Municipality	around 1870	Preserved	Since 1952 it houses a nursing home.	
Aizpute manor	Aizpute parish	South Kurzeme Municipality	Finished in 1762	Preserved	The building houses the Aizpute Local History Museum	
Apriķi Manor	Laža parish	South Kurzeme Municipality	Completed in 1742	Preserved	It houses the Apriķi Primary School	
Bakūze manor	Embūte parish	South Kurzeme Municipality	built around 1867	Preserved	Formerly housed a school but now is a museum.	
Boja Manor	Kazdanga parish	South Kurzeme Municipality	Built in 1860	Preserved	It currently houses a museum	
Cīrava Palace	Cīrava parish	South Kurzeme Municipality	1752	Preserved	Reconstructed in the 1960s	
Cēre Manor	Cēre parish	Tukums Municipality	Rebuilt in the 1860s	Preserved	It currently houses the Cēre Primary School	
Vecpils (Dižlāņi) manor	Vecpils parish	South Kurzeme Municipality	Unknown	Destroyed	A guest house by the name of "Vecpils muiža" was constructed on the former site of the manor.	
Dēsele manor	Embūte parish	South Kurzeme Municipality	Possibly built in 1886	Ruins	The manor was left abandoned after the 1970s	
Drukmejera manor	Grobiņa parish	South Kurzeme Municipality	1913	Preserved		
Dursupe Manor	Balgale parish	Talsi Municipality	Built in 1820	Preserved	Currently is private property	
Dzērve Manor	Cīrava parish	South Kurzeme Municipality	Early 19th century	Preserved	It currently houses the Dzērve Primary School	
Embūte manor	Embūte parish	South Kurzeme Municipality	18th century	Ruins	Built upon the foundations of the old manor, it is now in ruin right next to the Embūte castle ruins, as well as the Embūte church ruins.	
Ezere Manor	Ezere parish	Saldus municipality	Built in 1750	Preserved	It houses the Ezere Secondary School	
Firck Palace	Talsi	Talsi municipality	Built in 1883	Preserved	It houses the Talsi Regional Museum	
Gavieze manor	Gavieze parish	South Kurzeme Municipality	19th century	Preserved	The manor itself is an elementary school, but a culture house has been established in the former stable	
Iļģi palace	Grobiņa parish	South Kurzeme Municipality	late 18th-early 19th century	Preserved	It houses the State Social Care Center	
Īvande Manor	Īvande parish	Kuldīga municipality	After 1850	Preserved	Stands next to the Īvande Old Manor	
Īvande old manor	Īvade parish	South Kurzeme Municipality	early 18th century	Preserved	Stands next to the Īvande Manor	
Jaunauce Manor	Jaunauce parish	Saldus municipality	Early 19th century	Preserved	It houses the Jaunauce Primary School	
Jaunmuiža Manor	Jaunlutriņi parish	Saldus municipality	Beginning of the 1800s	Preserved	It houses the Jaunlutriņu Elementary School	
Kabile Manor	Kabile parish	Kuldīga municipality	Between 1734 and 1740	Preserved	Remodelled in the 1860s	
Kalēti manor	Kalēti parish	South Kurzeme municipality	1876	Preserved	Today, the manor houses the Kalēti Primary School, but the Music and Art School works creatively in the left wing of the building.	
Kalna Manor	Rudbārži parish	Kuldīga Municipality	Around 1855	Preserved	Made available for public events	
Kalnmuiža Manor	Saldus parish	Saldus municipality	Completed in 1874	Preserved	It houses the Saldus Agricultural School	
Kapsēde manor	Medze parish	South Kurzeme Municipality	rebuilt in 1843	Preserved	The manor is being sold	
Kazdanga Palace	Kazdanga parish	South Kurzeme Municipality	1800	Preserved	Burned in 1905 and renovated in 1907	
Laidi Palace	Laidi parish	Kuldīga municipality	Early 19th century	Preserved	It houses the Laidi Primary School	
Lamiņi Manor	Pūre parish	Tukums municipality	Between 1855 and 1856	Preserved	It houses the Dzirciems boarding school	
Laža-Padure manor	Laža parish	South Kurzeme Municipality	1871	Preserved	It houses the Laža boarding school	
Lieģi manor	Tadaiķi parish	South Kurzeme Municipality	2nd half of the 18th century	Preserved	Currently it is being sold	
Lielbāta manor	Vaiņode parish	South Kurzeme Municipality	17th century	Preserved	Private property	
Līguti manor	Durbe parish	South Kurzeme Municipality	1825	Preserved		
Nogale Manor	Ārlava parish	Talsi municipality	Built around 1880	Preserved	Built by architect T. Seiler	
Nīca manor	Nīca parish	South Kurzeme Municipality	18th century?	Original look has been lost, but it is technically preserved.	It houses the social home "Ārītes"	
Padure Manor	Padure parish	Kuldīga municipality	Late 1830s to early 1840s	Preserved, but on sale	It housed the Padure's library until 2005	
Pastende Manor	Ģibuļi parish	Talsi municipality	Built in 1700	Preserved	It houses the Pastende primary school	
Pelči Palace	Pelči parish	Kuldīga municipality	Built in 1903–1904	Preserved	One of the early Latvian manors	
Pope Palace	Pope parish	Ventspils municipality	Originally built in 1653	Preserved	It houses the Pope primary school	
Priekule palace	Priekule parish	South Kurzeme Municipality	18th century	Preserved	It houses a highschool	
Purmsāti manor	Virga parish	South Kurzeme Municipality	1st mentioned in 1357	Preserved	Houses the Mežupe Primary School (children with special needs study here)	
Rāva manor	Dunalka parish	South Kurzeme Municipality	1834	Preserved	Houses the Rāva school	
Reģi Manor	Reģi	Kuldīga Municipality	Built in 1890	Partially preserved	It had a fire in 2007	
Rudbarži Palace	Rudbārži parish	Kuldīga Municipality	Built in 1835	Preserved	It houses the Oskars Kalpaks Rudbārži School	
Sasmaka Manor	Valdgale parish	Talsi municipality	Built in 1886	Preserved		
Snēpele Palace	Snēpele parish	Kuldīga municipality	In the 19th century	Preserved	It houses the Snēpele Primary School	
štakeldanga manor	Laža parish	South Kurzeme Municipality	19th century	Preserved		
Stende Manor	Lībagi parish	Talsi municipality	Between 1820 and 1848	Preserved	Converted into apartments after 1925	
Strante manor	Saka parish	South Kurzeme Municipality		Preserved	Private property	
Susta manor	Gavieze parish	South Kurzeme Municipality	19th century	Ruins	Destroyed in 1943	
Tāši manor	Medze parish	South Kurzeme Municipality	1734	Preserved	Open to tours	
Tāšu-Padure Manor	Kalvene parish	Kuldīga Municipality	Early 19th century	Preserved	It houses the Kalvene elementary school	
Tiņģere Manor	Īve parish	Talsi municipality	Built in 1805	Preserved	It houses the Tiņģere elementary school	
Vaiņode Manor	Vaiņode parish	South Kurzeme Municipality	Built in 1912	Ruins	Destroyed during Second World War	
Valdeķi Manor	Kandava parish	Tukums Municipality	Built in 1882	Preserved	It currently houses a museum	
Vandzene Manor	Vandzene parish	Talsi municipality	Beginning of the 1800s	Preserved	It houses the Vandzene secondary school	
Vārme Manor	Vārme parish	Kuldīga municipality	Built in the 19th century	Preserved	It houses the Vārme primary school	
Vērgale Palace	Vērgale parish	South Kurzeme Municipality	Built in the 18th century	Preserved	It currently houses the Vērgale school	
Zentene Palace	Zentene parish	Tukums municipality	Between 1845 and 1850	Preserved	It housed the Zentene School from 1938	
Virga manor	Virga parish	South Kurzeme Municipality	After 1583	Preserved	It has a statue of Swedish king Charles XII	
Ziemupe manor	Vērgale parish	South Kurzeme Municipality	19th century	Preserved	It's now a hotel	

== Zemgale ==
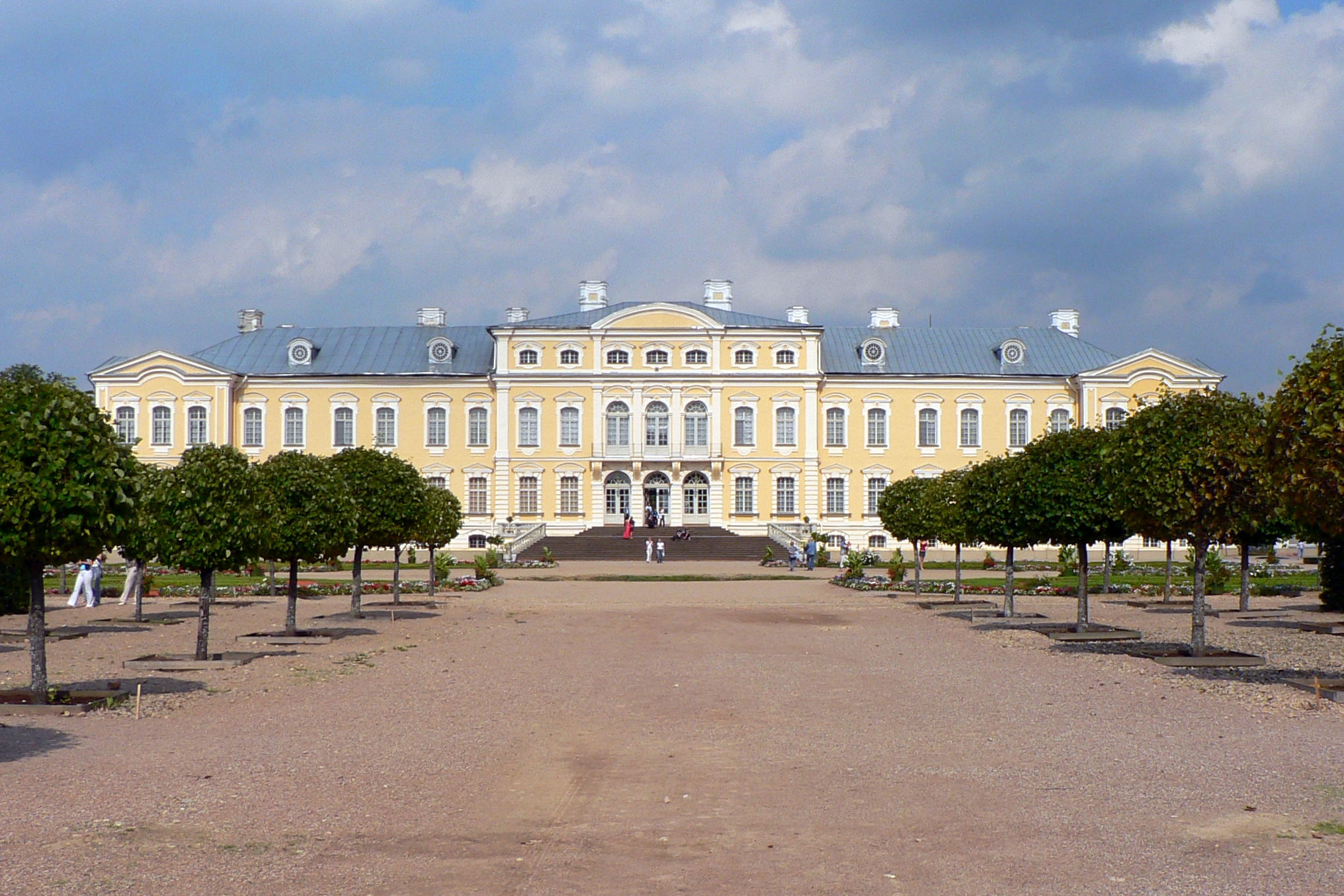
Rundale Palace

Name	Parish	Municipality	Established	Status	Notes	Refs
Aizupe Manor	Vāne parish	Tukums Municipality	Completed in 1823	Partially preserved	From 1939 to 1985 it housed a forestry school	
Baldone Manor	Baldone	Ķekava Municipality	Built in 1901	Preserved		
Bēne Manor	Bēne parish	Dobele Municipality	End of the 16th century	Preserved	Rebuilt between 1876 and 1878	
Biksti Manor	Biksti parish	Dobele municipality	In the 19th century	Preserved	It houses the Biksti Elementary School	
Blankenfelde Manor	Vilce parish	Jelgava municipality	1743	Preserved	Under renovation	
Bornsminde Manor	Rundāle parish	Bauska Municipality	1763	Preserved	It formerly housed a gardening school	
Bramberģe Manor	Glūda parish	Jelgava municipality	Built in the 17th century	Preserved	Abandoned	
Brukna Manor	Dāviņi parish	Bauska municipality	Built in the 18th century	Preserved	Rebuilt in the 19th century	
Durbe Palace	Tukums	Tukums municipality	1671	Preserved	It currently houses the Tukuma Museum	
Dzimtmisa Manor	Dzimtmisa	Bauska Municipality	19th century	Preserved	It currently houses the Dzimtmisa School	
Jaunmokas Manor	Tume parish	Tukums municipality	Rebuilt in 1901	Preserved	First mentioned in 1536	
Jelgava Palace	Jelgava	Jelgava municipality	1738–1772	Preserved	Largest Baroque style palace in the Baltic states	
Kaucminde Manor	Rundāle parish	Bauska Municipality	Completed around 1780	Preserved	Designed by architect Severin Jensen	
Lielauce Manor	Lielauce parish	Dobele Municipality	In the 19th century	Preserved	Restored from 1901	
Mencendarbe Manor	Baldone	Bauska Municipality	After 1786	Preserved		
Mežotne Palace	Mežotne parish	Bauska municipality	1798–1802	Preserved	Reconstructed in 2001, used as a hotel	
Mežmuiža Manor	Augstkalne parish	Dobele Municipality	Around 1850	Preserved	It houses the Augstkalne Secondary School	
Remte Manor	Remte parish	Saldus Municipality	Built in 1800	Preserved	It houses the Remte Primary School	
Reņģe Manor	Ruba parish	Saldus municipality	1881–1882	Preserved	It houses the Ruba Primary School	
Rundāle Palace	Rundāle parish	Bauska Municipality	Built in the 1730s	Preserved	Completed in 1768	
Skaistkalne Manor	Skaistkalne parish	Bauska Municipality	1893–1894	Preserved	It houses the Skaistkalne secondary school	
Svēte Manor	Svēte parish	Jelgava municipality	Built around 1730	Preserved	Extensively remodeled from 1774 to 1775	
Svitene Manor	Svitene parish	Bauska Municipality	Beginning of the 1800s	Preserved	It houses the Svitene Primary School	
Šķēde Manor	Šķēde parish	Saldus municipality	Completed in 1761	Preserved	Private property	
Vadakste Manor	Vadakste parish	Saldus municipality	Between 1911 and 1914	Preserved	It houses the Vadakste Primary School	
Vāne Manor	Vāne parish	Bauska Municipality	Built in 1870	Preserved	It houses the Vāne primary school.	
Vecauce Manor	Auce rural area	Dobele Municipality	Between 1839 and 1843	Preserved	Designed by Friedrich August Stüler	
Zaļenieki Manor	Zaļenieki parish	Jelgava municipality	Built between 1768 and 1775	Preserved	It houses the Zaļenieki Vocational School	
Zante Manor	Zante parish	Tukums Municipality	Before 1850	Preserved	It houses the Zante primary school	
Zasa Manor	Zasa parish	Jēkabpils municipality		Ruins		
Zemīte Manor	Zemīte parish	Tukums Municipality	Built in the 19th century	Preserved	It currently houses a school	

== Sēlija ==
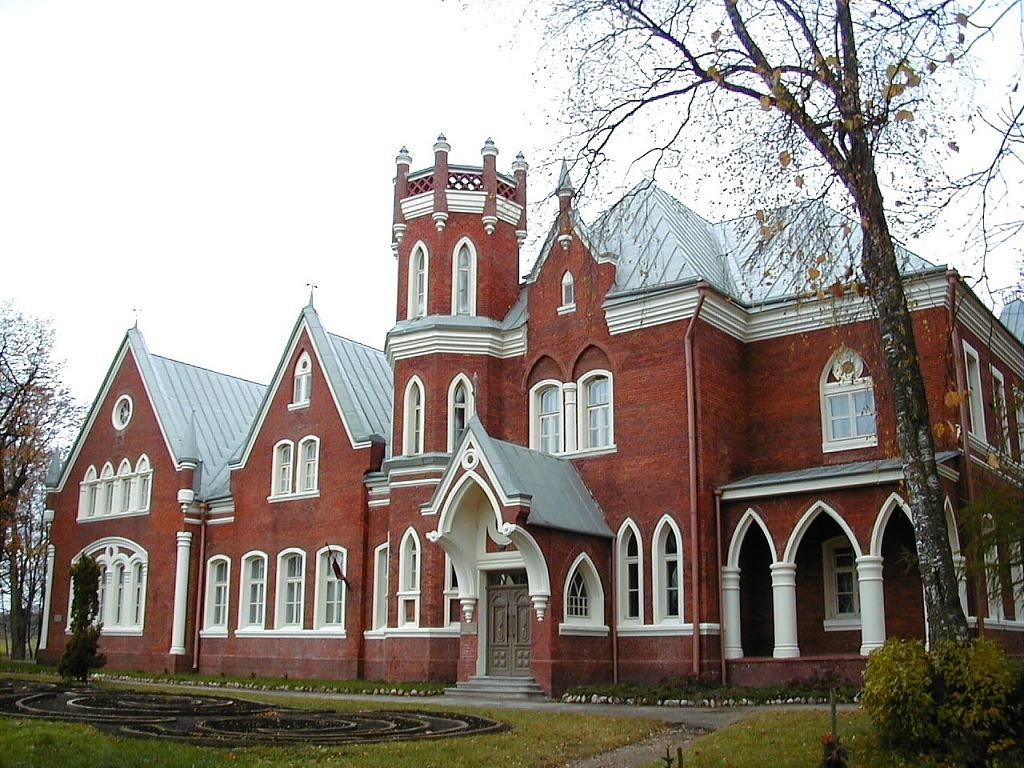
Vecsaliena (Červonka) manor

Name	Parish	Municipality	Established	Status	Notes	Refs
Asare Manor	Asare parish	Aknīste municipality	Built in 1749	Ruins	Burned down in January 1926	
Bebrene Manor	Bebrene parish	Ilūkste municipality	Building completed in 1896	Preserved	It houses the Bebrene secondary school	
Ērberģe Manor	Mazzalve parish	Nereta municipality	18th century	Preserved	It currently houses the Mazzalve School	
Gārsene Manor	Gārsene parish	Aknīste municipality	Built around 1856	Preserved	It currently houses the Budberg museum	
Ilga Manor	Skrudaliena parish	Daugavpils municipality	19th century	Preserved	Renovation completed in 2012	
Jaunsvente Manor	Svente parish	Daugavpils municipality	Completed in 1912	Preserved	Under restoration work since 2002	
Lielmēmele Manor	Mazzalve parish	Nereta municipality	After 1850	Preserved	Former manor built in 1801	
Lielzalve Manor	Zalve parish	Nereta municipality	Built in the 19th century	Preserved	Lielzalve School was closed in 2009	
Šēnheida Manor	Skrudaliena parish	Daugavpils municipality	1870	Preserved	The estate remained divided between 1922 and 1939	
Vecmēmele Manor	Mazzalve parish	Nereta municipality	Built after 1825	Preserved	Italian Neo-Renaissance style	
Vecsaliena Manor	Vecsaliena parish	Daugavpils municipality	1870	Preserved	Construction in Neo-Gothic style	
Vecborne Manor	Kaplava parish	Krāslava municipality	1880s	Preserved		

== Vidzeme ==
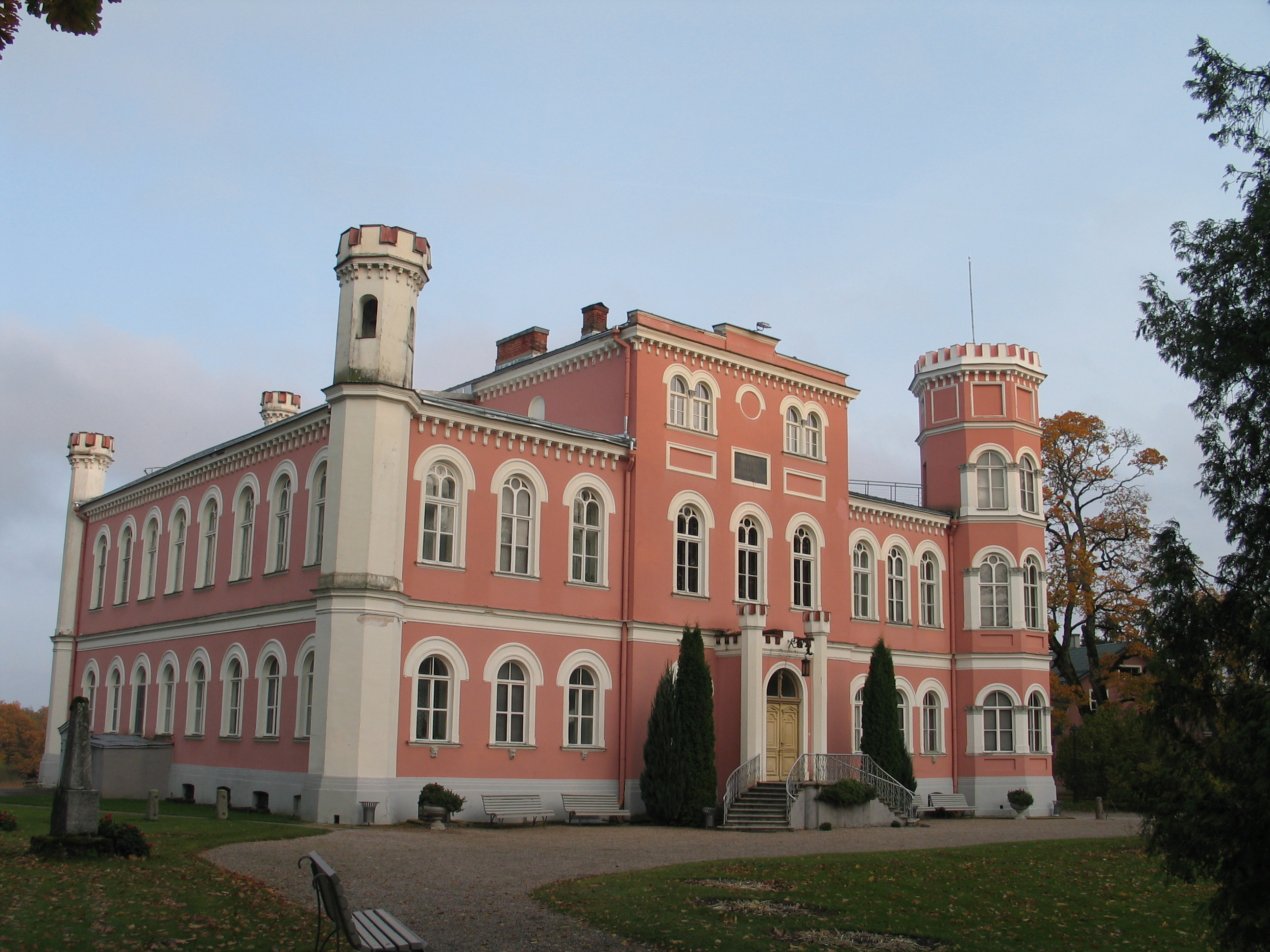
Bīriņi palace

Name	Parish	Municipality	Established	Status	Notes	Refs
Aumeisteri Manor	Grundzāle parish	Smiltene municipality	1793	Preserved		
Beļava Manor	Beļava parish	Gulbene municipality	Around 1760	Preserved		
Biksēre Manor	Sarkaņi parish	Madona municipality		Preserved		
Bīriņi Palace	Vidriži parish	Limbaži municipality	Built between 1857 and 1860	Preserved	Rebuilt in the beginning of the 20th century	
Cesvaine Palace	Cesvaine	Cesvaine municipality	Built in 1896	Preserved	Architects Hans Grisebach and August Dinklage	
Cirsti Manor	Ineši parish	Vecpiebalga municipality	1886	Preserved	Renovated in 2000	
Dikļi Manor	Dikļi parish	Kocēni municipality	1896	Preserved	Restored and privately owned since 2000	
Dole Manor	Salaspils parish	Salaspils municipality	1898	Preserved	It currently houses the Daugava River Museum	
Drabeši Manor	Drabeši parish	Amata municipality		Preserved		
Dzelzava Manor	Dzelzava parish	Madona municipality	1767	Preserved		
Dzērbene Manor	Dzērbene parish	Vecpiebalga municipality	Built in 18th century	Preserved		
Gaujiena Palace	Gaujiena parish	Ape municipality		Preserved		
Igate Manor	Vidriži parish	Limbaži municipality	Around 1880	Preserved	It is currently a hotel	
Jaungulbene Manor	Jaungulbene parish	Gulbene municipality	Completed in 1878	Preserved		
Jumurda Manor	Jumurda parish	Ērgļi municipality		Preserved		
Katvari Manor	Katvari parish	Limbaži municipality		Preserved		
Kokmuiža Manor	Kocēni parish	Kocēni municipality		Preserved		
Liepa Manor	Liepa parish	Priekuļi municipality	During 19th century	Preserved		
Lubeja Manor	Liezēre Parish	Madona Municipality		Preserved		
Litene Manor	Litene parish	Gulbene municipality	Built before 1850	Preserved	It houses the Litene Elementary School	
Lizums Manor	Lizums parish	Gulbene municipality	Around 1850	Preserved	It houses the Lizums Secondary School	
Mālpils Manor	Mālpils	Mālpils municipality	Restructured after 1750	Preserved	The building was rebuilt from 1905	
Mazsalaca Manor	Mazsalaca	Mazsalaca municipality	Built before 1780	Preserved	It now houses the Mazsalaca School	
Mūrmuiža Manor	Kauguri parish	Beverīna municipality		Preserved		
Naukšēni Manor	Naukšēni parish	Naukšēni municipality	End of the 18th century	Preserved	It houses the Naukšēni People Museum	
Odziena Manor	Vietalva parish	Pļaviņas municipality	Around 1850	Partly ruined		
Ozolmuiža Manor	Brīvzemnieki parish	Aloja municipality	End of the 18th century	Preserved	It houses the Ozolmuiža Elementary School	
Palsmane Manor	Palsmane parish	Smiltene municipality	Built in 1880	Preserved		
Puikule Manor	Brīvzemnieki parish	Aloja municipality	1870s	Preserved	It houses the Puikule Primary School.	
Sēja Manor (Zögenhof)	Sēja parish	Sēja municipality	Built in 1766 Renovated from 1883 to 1885	Ruins		
Sērmūkši Manor (Schloss Sermus)	Skujene parish	Amata municipality		Destroyed by fire in 1905	Sērmūkši School built on former site in 1936	
Skrīveri Manor (Römershof)	Skrīveri Parish	Skrīveri municipality	Built from 1881 to 1887	Destroyed in 1915 during the World War I.		
Stāmeriena Palace (Schloss Stomersee)	Stāmeriena parish	Gulbene municipality	Built from 1835 to 1843	Preserved		
Stukmaņi Manor	Klintaine parish	Pļaviņas municipality		Preserved		
Suntaži Manor	Suntaži parish	Ogre municipality	End of the 18th century	Preserved	Renovated in 1909	
Taurupe Manor	Taurupe parish	Ogre municipality	After 1724	Preserved	Converted into a school in 1938	
Trapene Manor	Trapene parish	Ape municipality	Beginning of the 1800s	Preserved		
Ungurmuiža Manor	Raiskums parish	Pārgauja municipality	1732	Preserved		
Vecbebri Manor	Bebri parish	Koknese municipality		Preserved		
Vecgulbene Manor (Alt Schwanenburg)	Gulbene	Gulbene municipality	1763	Preserved	It now houses a Spa Hotel	
Veselava Manor	Veselava parish	Priekuļi municipality	Built in the 19th century	Preserved		
Vestiena Manor	Vestiena parish	Madona municipality	Built around 1750	Preserved	It houses the Vestiena Elementary School	
Ziemeri Manor	Ziemeri parish	Alūksne municipality		Preserved		
Zvārtava Manor	Gaujiena parish	Ape municipality		Preserved		

== Latgale ==
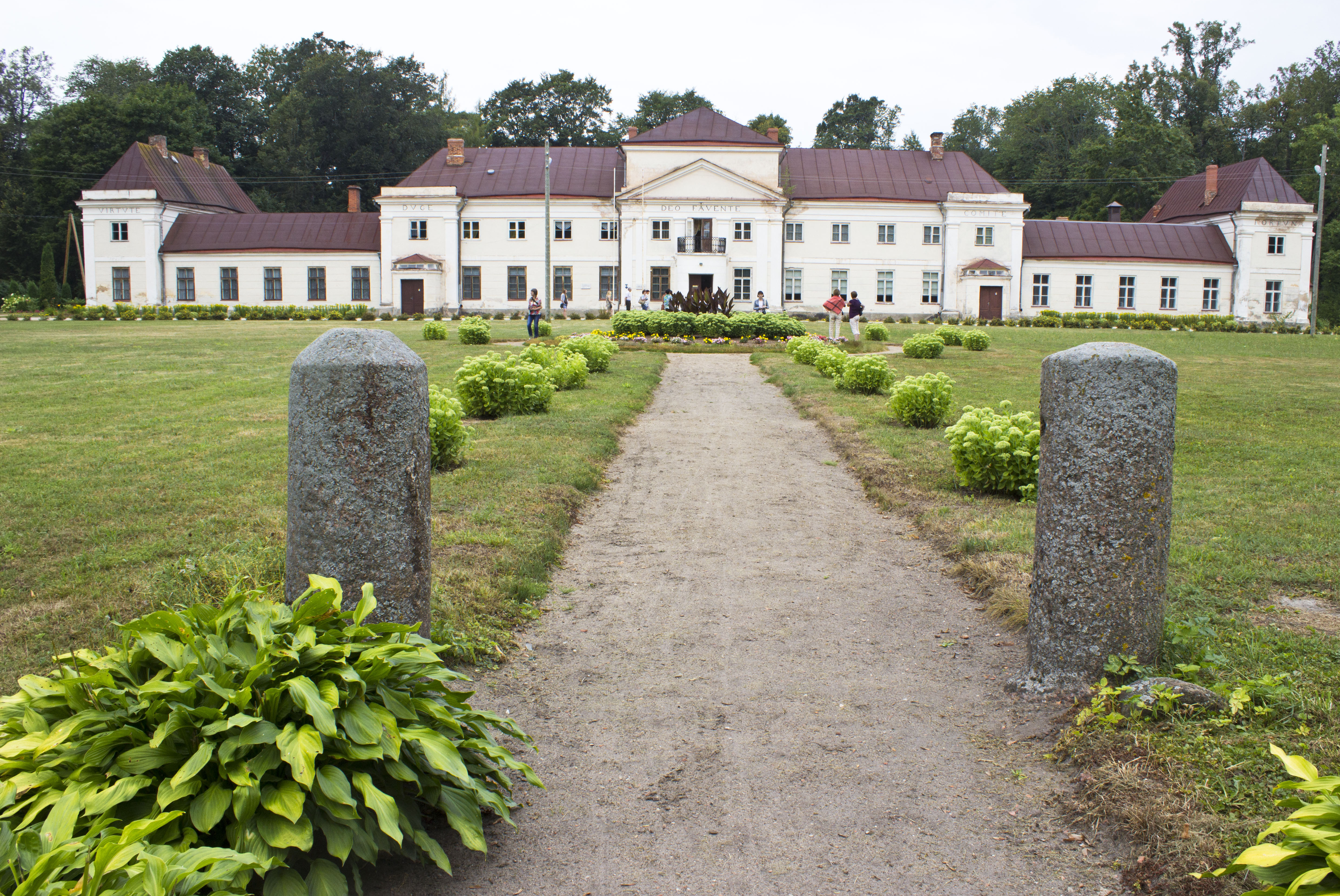
Varakļāni palace

Name	Parish	Municipality	Established	Status	Notes	Refs
Adamova Manor	Vērēmi parish	Rēzekne municipality	1851	Preserved		
Arendole Manor	Rožkalni parish	Vārkava municipality		Preserved		
Eversmuiža Manor	Cibla parish	Cibla municipality		Preserved		
Felicianova Manor	Cibla Parish	Cibla Municipality	Beginning of the 1900s	Preserved		
Jasmuiža Manor	Aizkalne parish	Preiļi municipality	Built between 1883 and 1891	Preserved	The manor currently houses a museum	
Juzefinova Manor	Pelēči parish	Preiļi municipality	Built between 1860 and 1863	Preserved	It housed a primary school from 1922 to 2003	
Kameņeca Manor	Aglona parish	Aglona municipality		Preserved		
Krāslava New Palace	Krāslava	Krāslava municipality	Completed in 1791	Preserved		
Krāslava Old Palace	Krāslava	Krāslava municipality	Built in 1759	Abandoned and ruined		
Lūznava Manor	Lūznava parish	Rēzekne municipality	Built between 1905 and 1911	Preserved		
Malnava Manor	Malnava parish	Kārsava municipality	Built in the 19th century	Preserved	The first building dates of 1784	
Pasiene Manor	Pasiene parish	Zilupe municipality	Built in the 17th century	Preserved	Privatised in need of renovation	
Preiļi Palace	Preiļi	Preiļi municipality	Built in the 19th century	Partially preserved	Reconstructed between 1860 and 1865	
Rikava Manor	Rikava parish	Rēzekne municipality	Built in 1870	Preserved	It currently houses the Rikava School	
Salnava Manor	Salnava parish	Kārsava municipality	Built in 1785	Preserved	It currently houses the Salnava Elementary School	
Varakļāni Palace	Varakļāni	Varakļāni municipality	Built between 1783 and 1789	Preserved	Varakļāni Regional Museum	
Vārkava Manor	Upmala Parish	Vārkava municipality	In the 19th century	Preserved	A new stone manor was built in 1865	

== See also ==
- List of castles in Latvia
- List of castles
- List of castles in Estonia
- List of palaces and manor houses in Estonia
- List of palaces and manor houses in Lithuania
- List of castles in Lithuania

== Sources ==
- Zarāns, Alberts (2006). Latvijas pilis un muižas. Castles and manors of Latvia (in Latvian and English). Riga. ISBN 9984-785-05-X. OCLC 72358861.
- Kurland Property Records
