= Laidi Palace =

Palace in Latvia

Laidi Palace / Laidi manor house
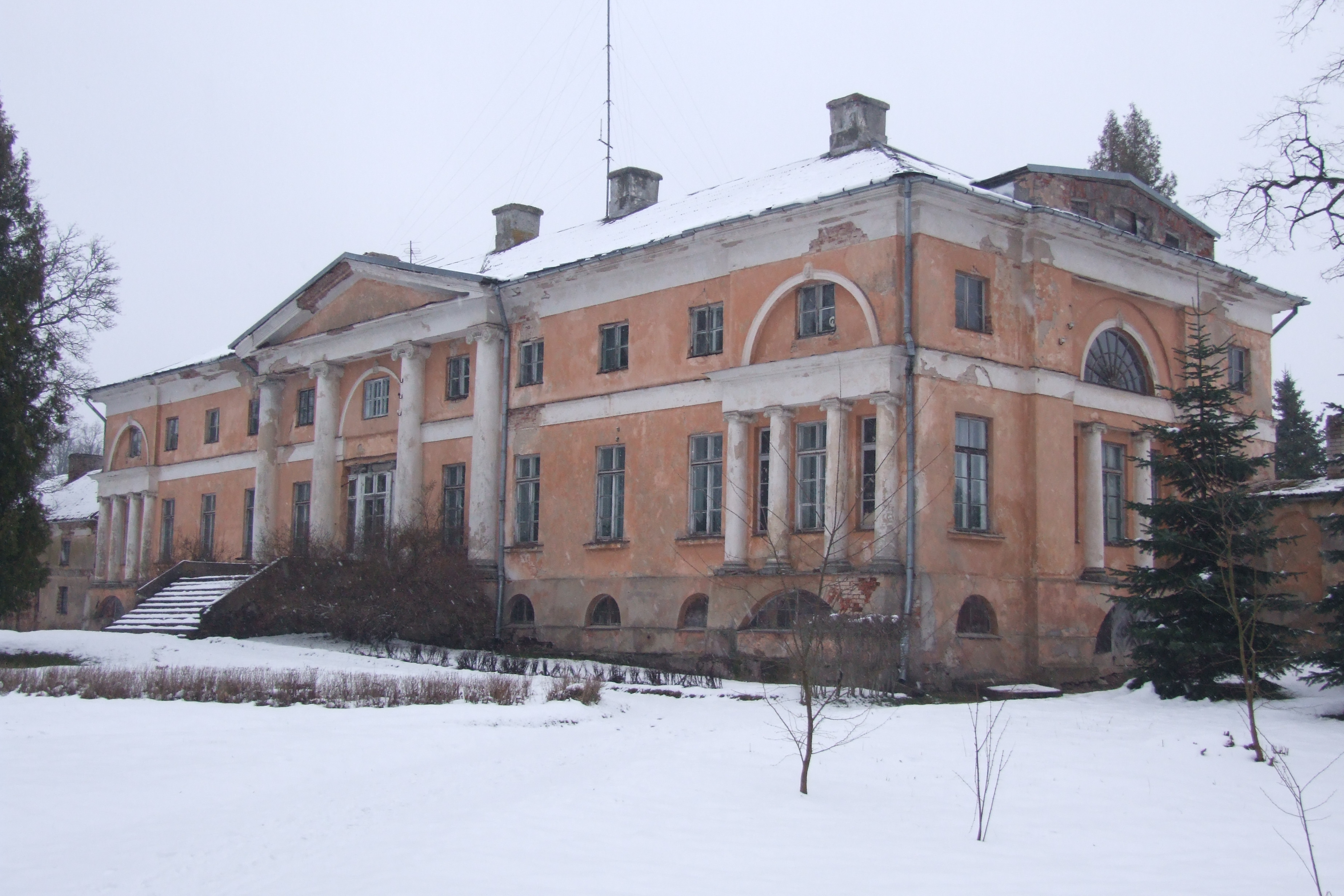

- Location within Latvia

General information
- Architectural style: Neoclassical architecture
- Location: Courland, Latvia
- Coordinates: 56°44′48″N 21°52′43″E
- Completed: 1810
- Client: nobleman Manteuffel

Laidi Palace (Latvian: Laidu muižas pils) is a palace in Laidi parish in Kuldīga municipality in the historical region of Courland, in western Latvia. Built in the early 19th century, it has housed the Laidi primary school since 1921.

== See also ==
- List of palaces and manor houses in Latvia
