= Kalna Manor =

Manor house in Latvia

Coordinates: 56.6900°N 21.8900°E

- Rudbārži Parish, Kuldīga Municipality, Courland, Latvia
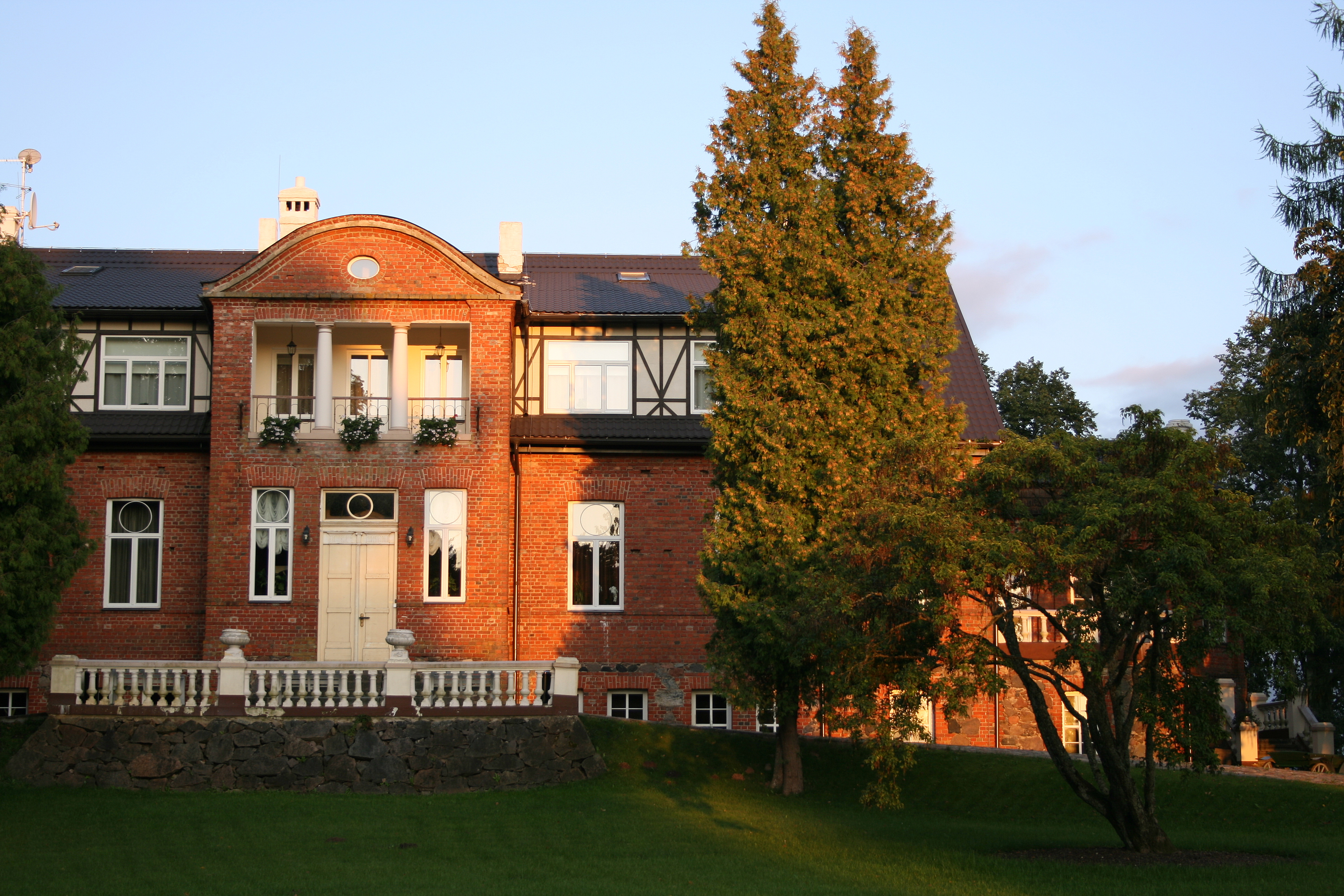

Site information
- Type: Manor

Site history
- Built: After 1855

Kalna Manor (Latvian: Kalnamuiža; German: Berghof), also called Sieksāte Manor, is a manor house in Rudbārži Parish, Kuldīga Municipality in the Courland region of Latvia. The complex includes a manor, park and farm buildings.

== History ==
The manor was built as a hunting lodge for Baron Fedor von Medem after he acquired the estate in 1855. It was quickly repaired after being damaged by fire in 1905. Between 1906 and 1912, it was restored according to the project of architect G. Berchi. The most recent restoration was completed in 2004, the building then being made available for public event rentals. A museum with exhibits on milk production is located in one of the other estate buildings.

== See also ==
- List of palaces and manor houses in Latvia
