= Cirsti Manor =

Manor house in Latvia

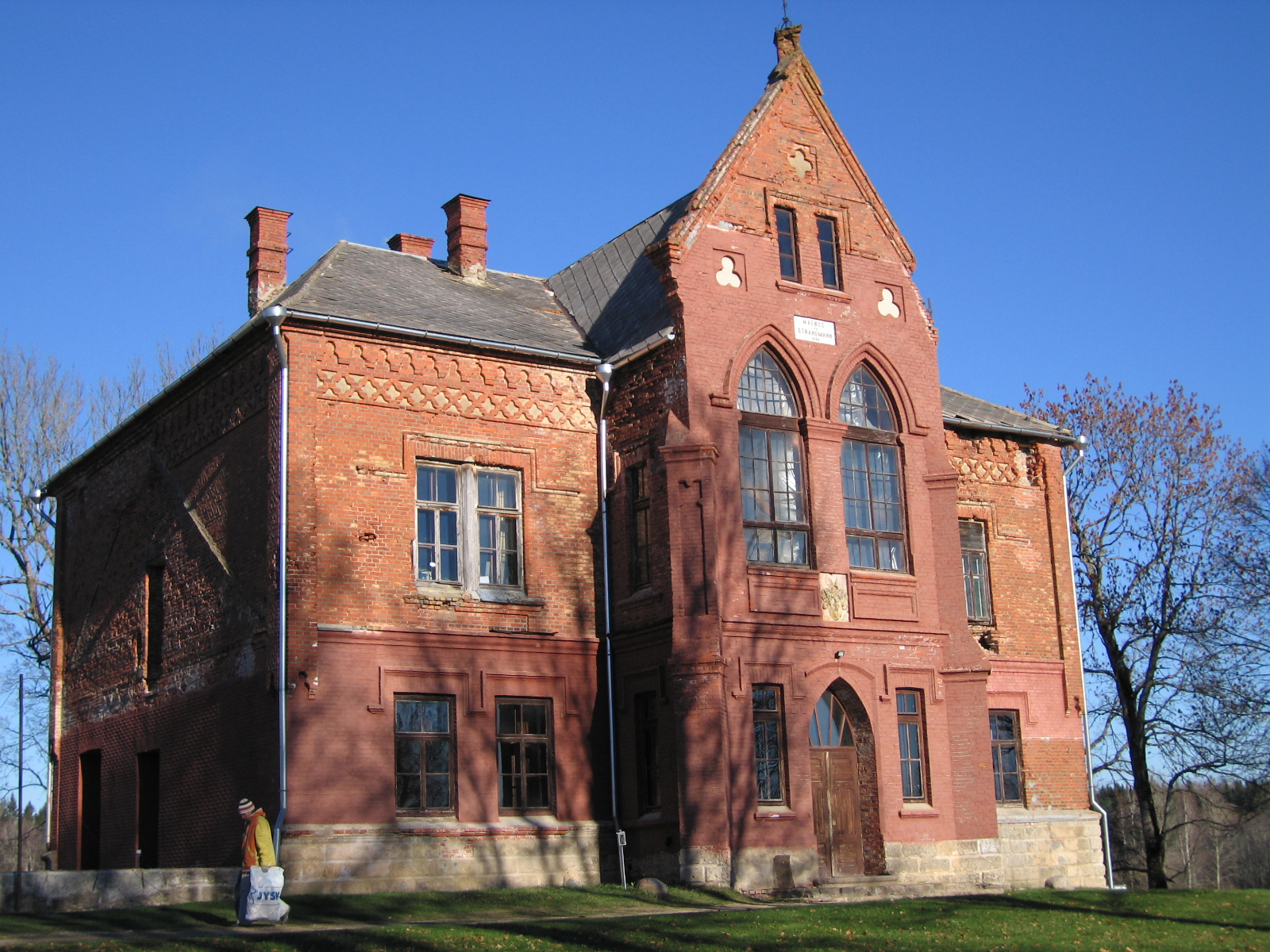
- Interactive map of the Cirsti Manor area

General information
- Architectural style: Neo-Gothic
- Location: Ineši Parish, Cēsis Municipality, Latvia
- Coordinates: 56°59′00″N 25°46′30″E
- Completed: 1886
- Client: M. von Strandmann

Cirsti Manor (Latvian: Cirstu muižas pils, German: Zirstenhoff) is a two-storey manor house built in 1886 in Neo-Gothic red brick style in the Ineši Parish of Cēsis Municipality in the Vidzeme region of Latvia.

== Architecture ==
Unusual to Neo-Gothic structures in Latvia, the hexagonal three-storey manor tower is detached from the main building.

== See also ==
- List of palaces and manor houses in Latvia
