= Mazsalaca Manor =

Manor house in Latvia

Coordinates: 57.8623°N 25.0366°E

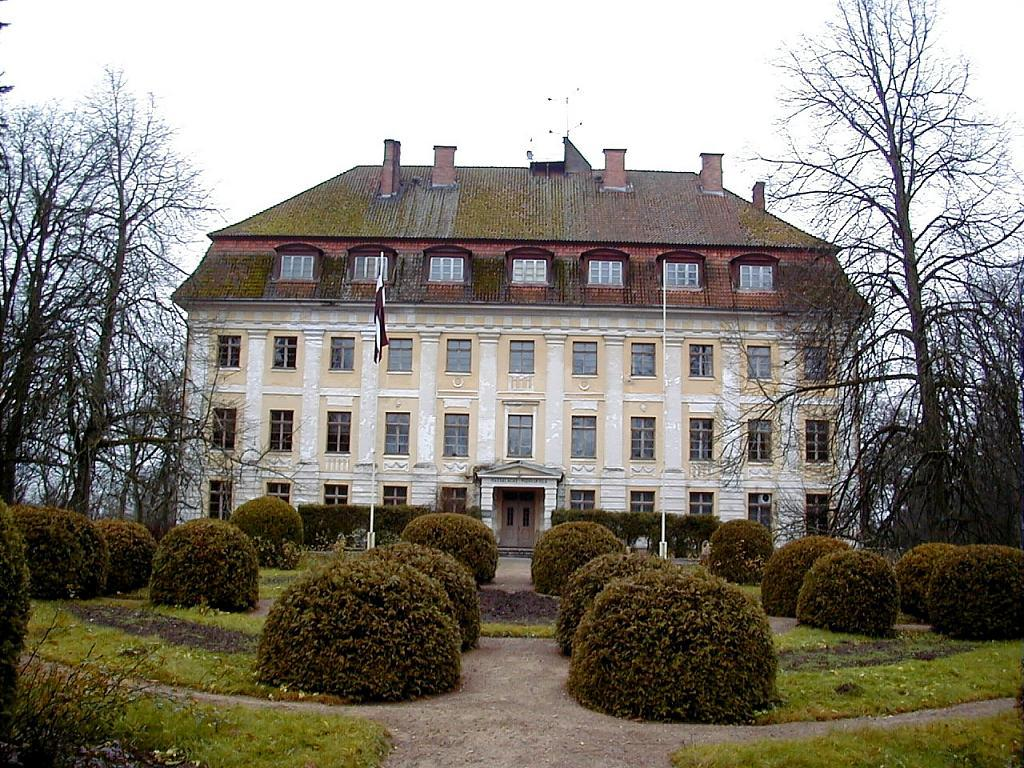
- Interactive map of the Mazsalaca Manor area

General information
- Architectural style: Classicism
- Location: Mazsalaca, Vidzeme, Latvia
- Completed: Before 1780
- Client: Vilhelm Georg von Fölkersahm

Mazsalaca Manor, also called Valtenberga or Valtenberģi Manor, is a manor house in Mazsalaca, Valmiera Municipality, in the Vidzeme region of Latvia. It was built before 1780 in German Classical style. Severely damaged by fire in 1905, the mansard roof was repaired in 1911 to preserve the remaining structure. Restoration was finally completed after 1925, and the building has housed the Mazsalaca secondary school ever since.

== See also ==
- List of palaces and manor houses in Latvia
