= Suntaži Manor =

Manor house in Latvia

Coordinates: 56°54′26″N 24°55′31″E

- Vidzeme, Latvia
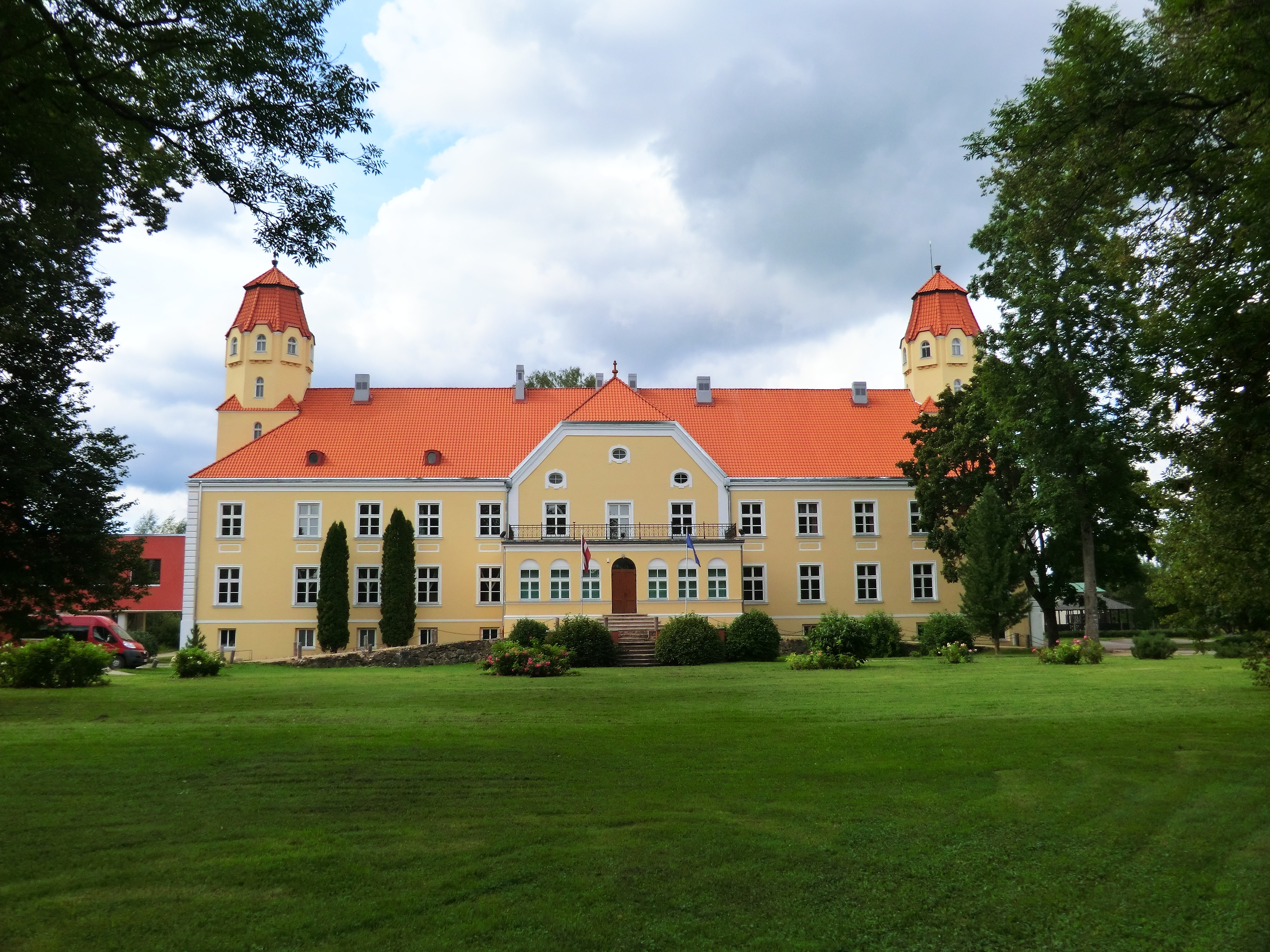

Site information
- Type: Manor

Suntaži Manor (Latvian: Suntažu muižas pils; German: Schloß Sunzel) is a manor house in the Suntaži Parish of Ogre Municipality in the Vidzeme region of Latvia. Originally built as a one-story structure near the end of the 18th century, it was enlarged during the 19th century. Severely damaged by fire in 1905, it was restored in 1909. Though the building housed the Suntaži primary school after 1920, it has housed the Suntaži secondary school since 1952.

== See also ==
- List of palaces and manor houses in Latvia
