= Naukšēni Manor =

Manor house in Latvia

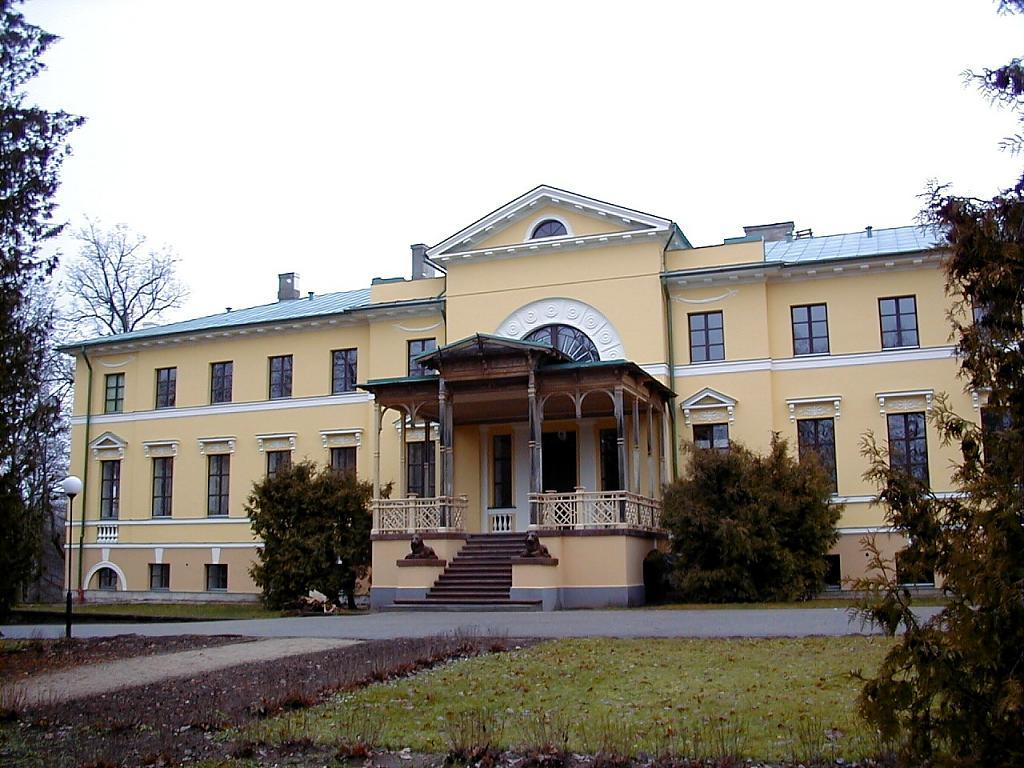

- Location within Latvia

General information
- Location: Naukšēni Parish, Valmiera Municipality, Vidzeme, Latvia
- Coordinates: 57°52′59″N 25°26′49″E
- Completed: 1820

Naukšēni Manor (Latvian: Naukšēnu muižas pils, German: Herrenhaus Naukschen) is a two-story manor house located in the Naukšēni Parish of Valmiera Municipality, in the historical region of Vidzeme, northern Latvia.

== History ==
Built in 1820, it was renovated in 1843 by Friedrich Gottlieb Gläser in Empire style according to the drafts made by its landlord Heinrich Wilhelm von Groth. Additional modifications were made at the end of the 19th century and again in 1938. Between 1920 and 1957, the building functioned as a children's home. It now houses the Naukšēni local history museum.

== See also ==
- List of palaces and manor houses in Latvia
