= Ziemeri Manor =

Manor house in Latvia

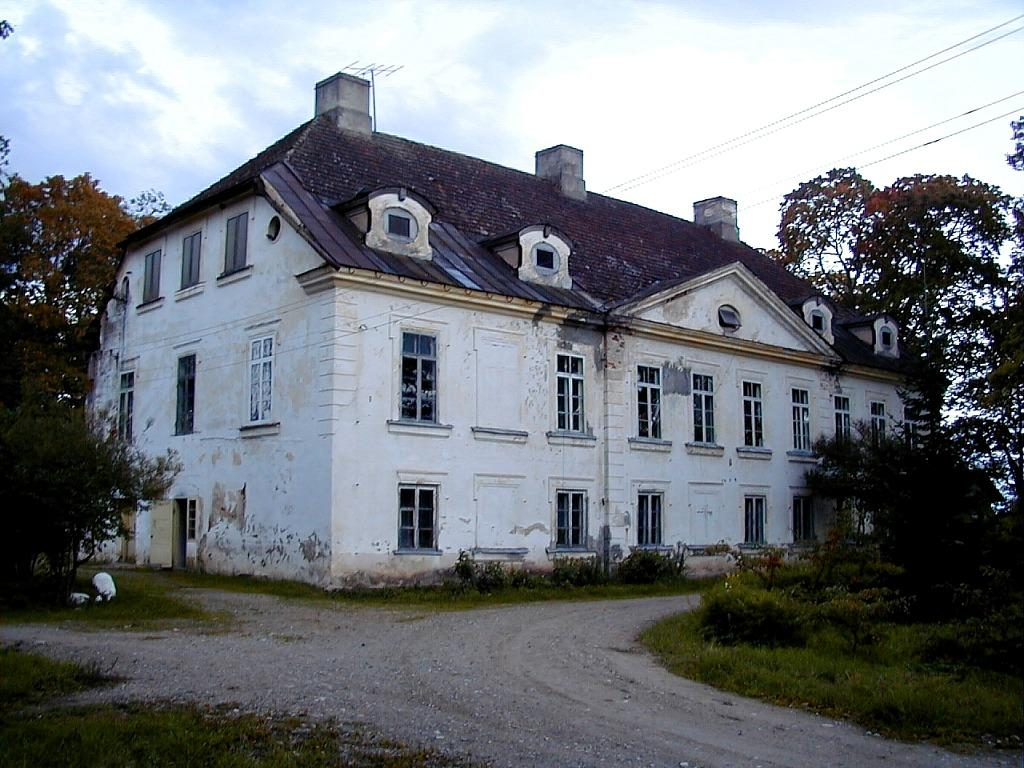

- Location within Latvia

General information
- Location: Vidzeme, Ziemeru muiža, Ziemeri Parish, Alūksne Municipality LV-4332,, Latvia
- Coordinates: 57°32′04″N 27°03′57″E
- Construction started: 1786
- Completed: 1807

Ziemeri Manor (Latvian: Ziemeru muižas pils) is a manor house in Ziemeri Parish, Alūksne Municipality in the Vidzeme region of Latvia.

== History ==
Ziemeri manor was first mentioned in 1550, when property owner Johans Felbergs sold the manor to his brother-in-law, Albreht Seimer, for 100 thalers. Over the centuries a large number of changes of ownership have occurred. The current Manor house was built between 1786 and 1807 in Classical style.

Nowadays, the manor offers guests the opportunity to experience other historical times, try on clothes in the manor salon and enjoy a dessert prepared according to an old recipe in the manor cafe “4 Rozes un Vilks”.

== See also ==
- List of palaces and manor houses in Latvia
