= Palsmane Manor =

Manor house in Latvia

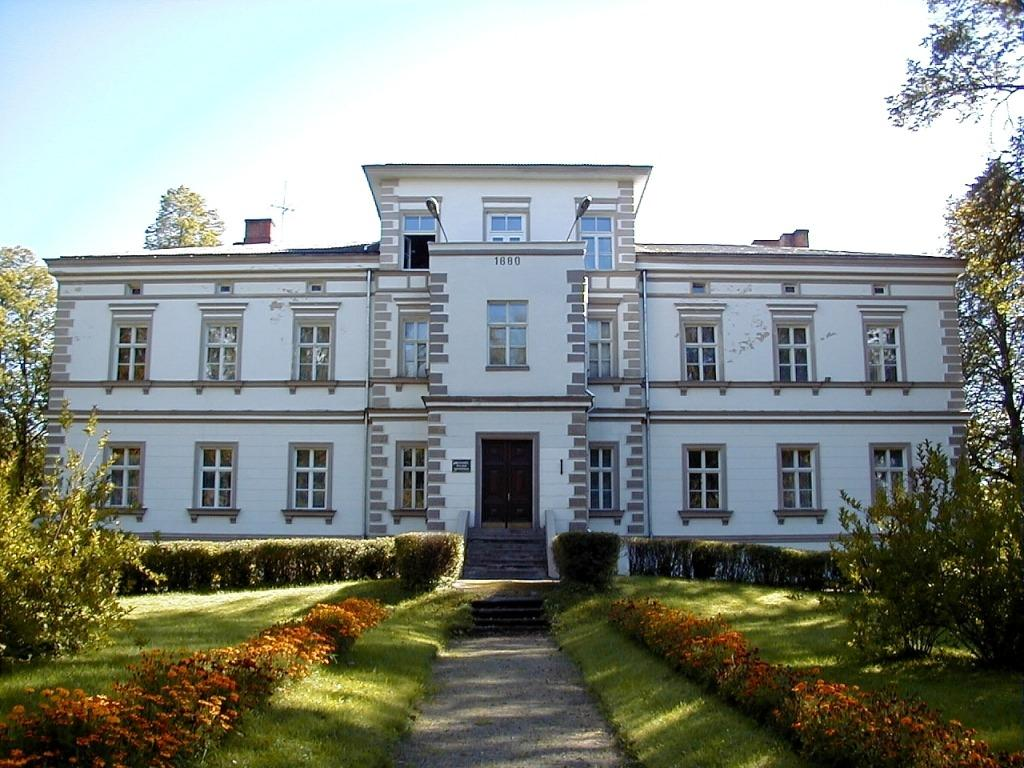
- Interactive map of the Palsmane Manor area

General information
- Architectural style: Eclectic
- Location: Smiltene municipality, Latvia
- Coordinates: 57°23′11″N 26°11′10″E
- Completed: 1880
- Client: von Behr

Palsmane Manor (Latvian: Palsmanes muižas pils, German: Palzmar) is a manor house built in Eclectic style in the Palsmane Parish of Smiltene Municipality in the Vidzeme region of Latvia.

== History ==
Construction of the Palsmane Manor started in 1870 and was completed in 1880. The building architecture was typical of the Latvian manor houses in the second half of the 19th century and can be characterized as eclectic neo-renaissance. Palsmane Manor has a simple and restrained facade decoration and a tower located in the center. The architect of the building is unknown, however it is believed that it is the work of the architect Rūdolfs Heinrichs Cirkvics. Until Latvian agrarian reform of 1920s, Paulina von Behr, born Kalena, was an owner of Palsmane manor.

In 1918, the state of Latvia was proclaimed, agrarian reform was implemented, and the property of German nobles was liquidated as a result. The village center was divided into farms and building plots, the manor house became the property of Palsmane Parish. Since then manor house was used for various purposes. First it housed a boarding school for school boys, housed a hospital for German soldiers during the World War II, and operated Palsmane Secondary School.

In later years, apartments for teachers of Palsmane Primary School were arranged at the manor premises. In 1959 Palsmane Special Boarding School was established in the manor, which still operates today.

== Manor park ==
The Manor park covers an area of 5.3 ha. The first plantations date back to the 19th century. Conifers were planted in the middle of 20th century. Trees in the park are about 100 years old and lindens and oaks about 150 years old.

== See also ==
- List of castles in Latvia
