= Vecgulbene Manor =

Manor house in Latvia

Coordinates: 57°09′41″N 26°45′40″E

- Vidzeme, Latvia
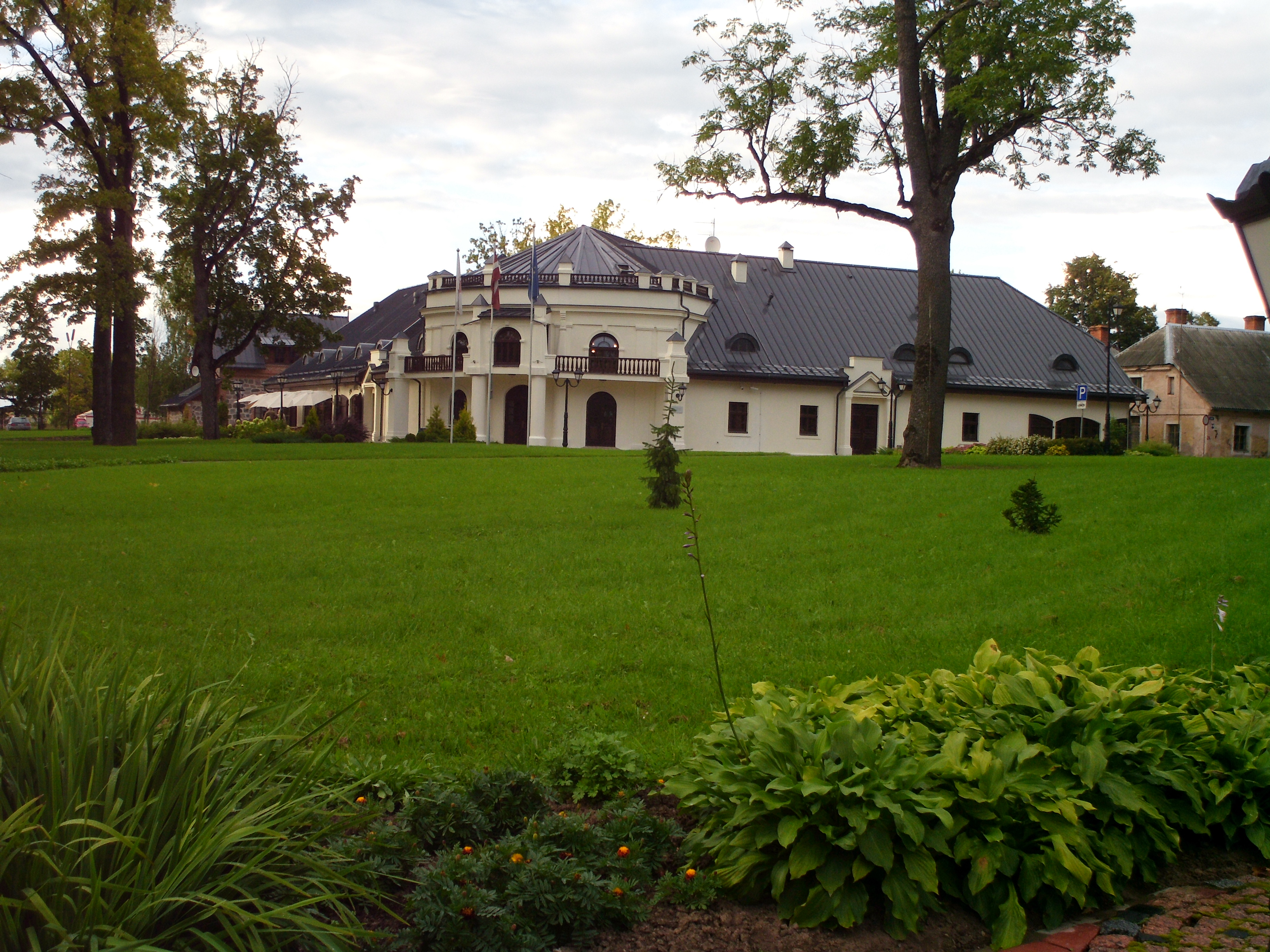
- Hotel in former riding arena on Vecgulbene estate

Site information
- Type: Manor

Site history
- Built: 1763

Vecgulbene Manor (Latvian: Vecgulbenes muižas pils) was a manor in Gulbene, Gulbene Municipality, in the Vidzeme region of Latvia.

It had 2 main buildings: the Red Palace (Latvian: Sarkanā pils) and the White Palace (Latvian: Balta pils).

== Gallery ==
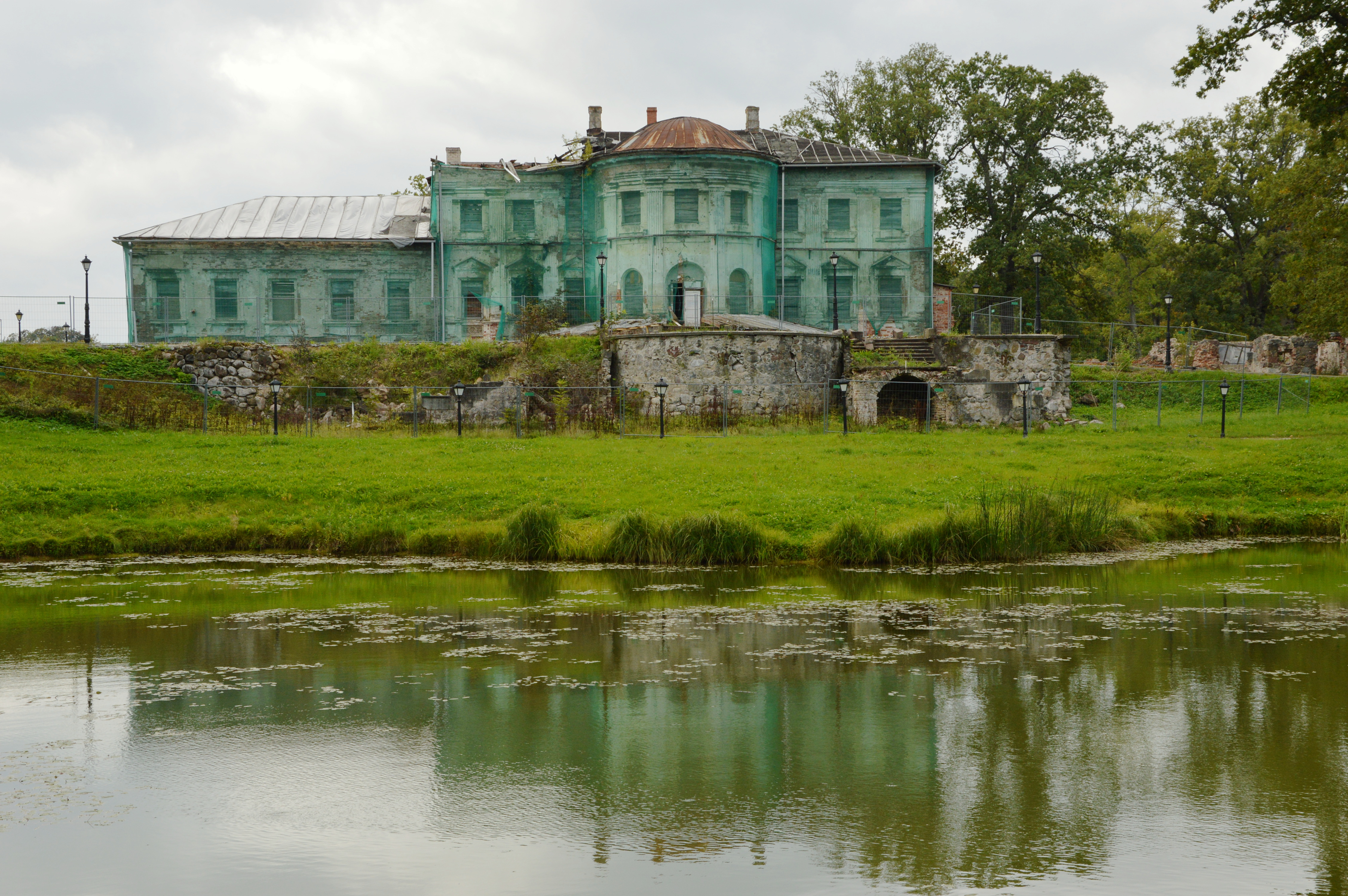
White Palace

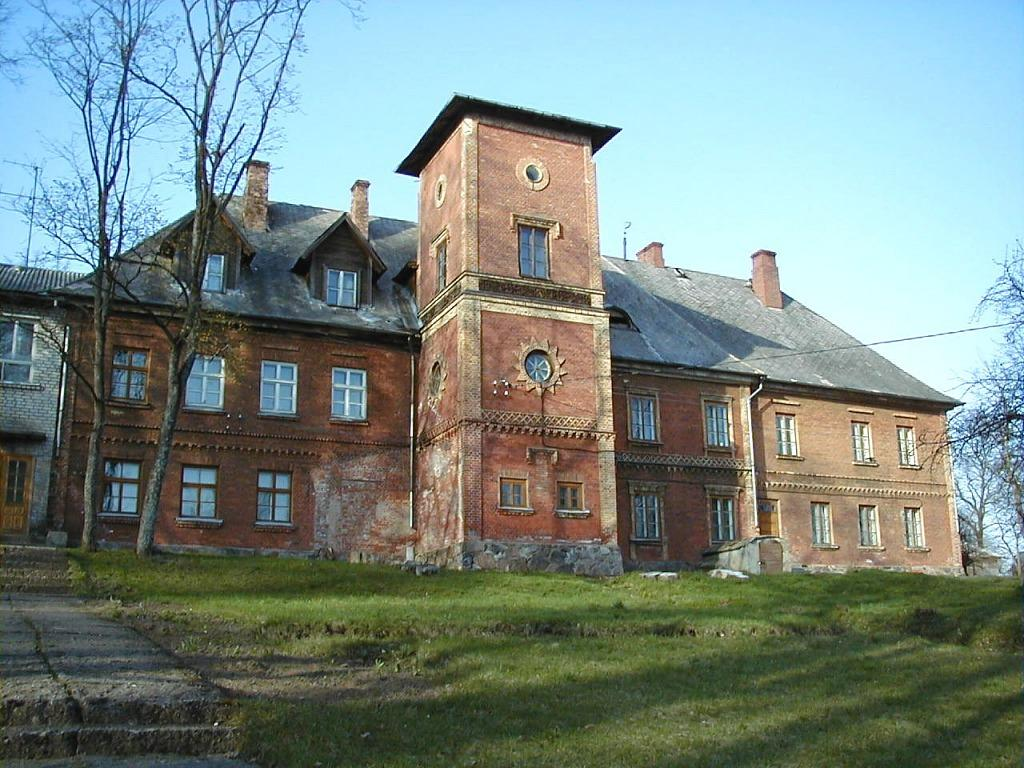
Red Palace

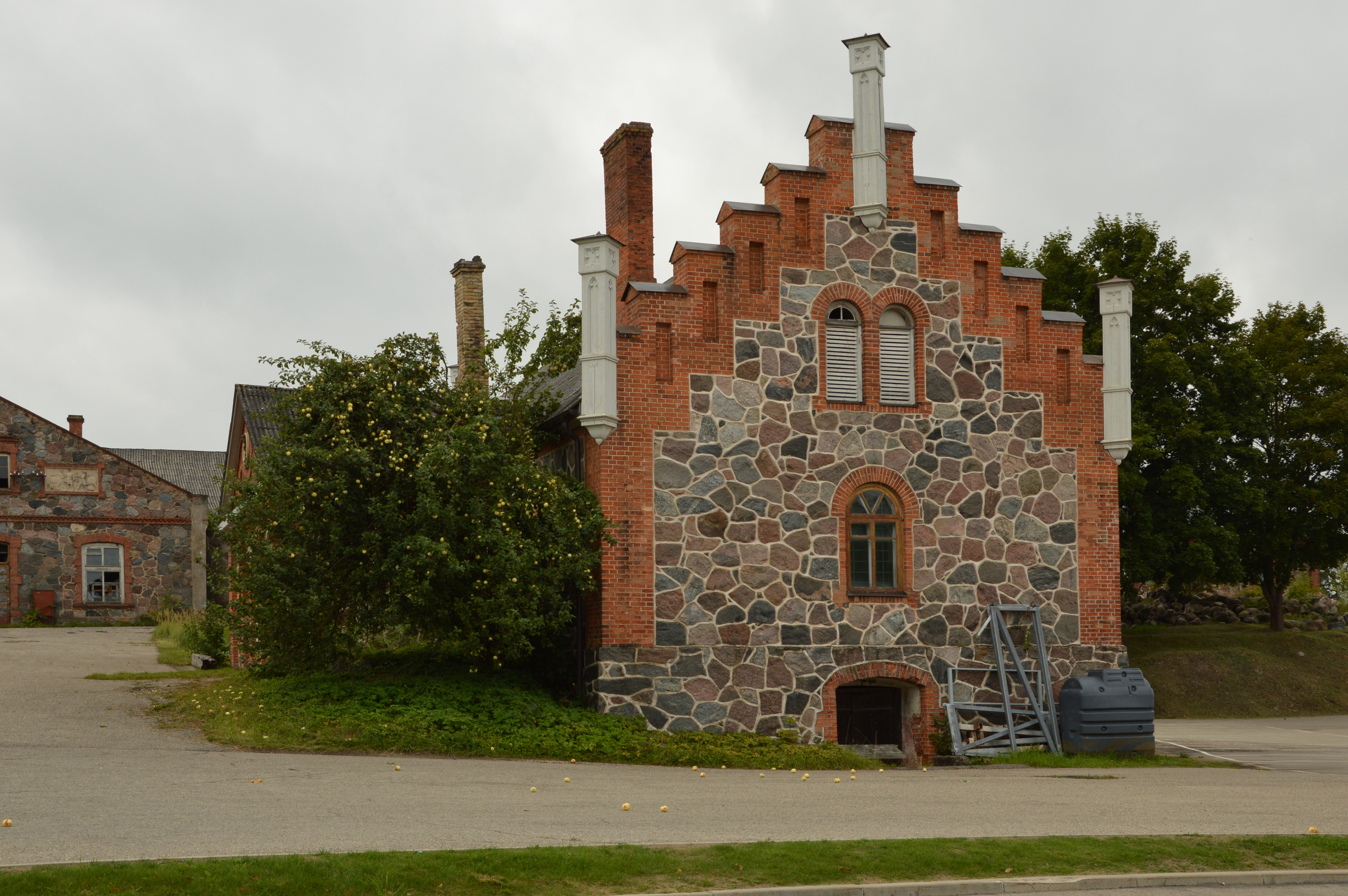

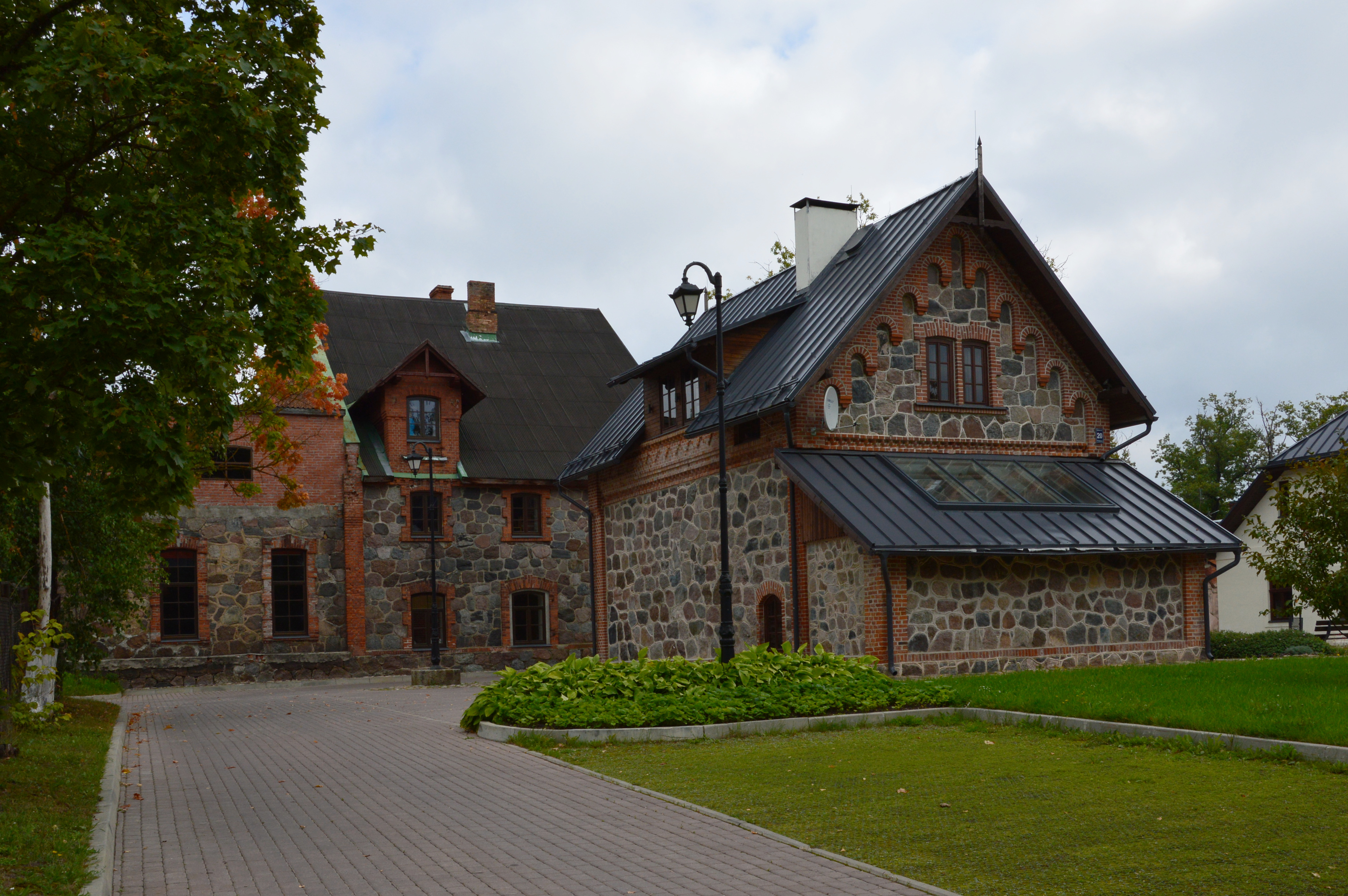

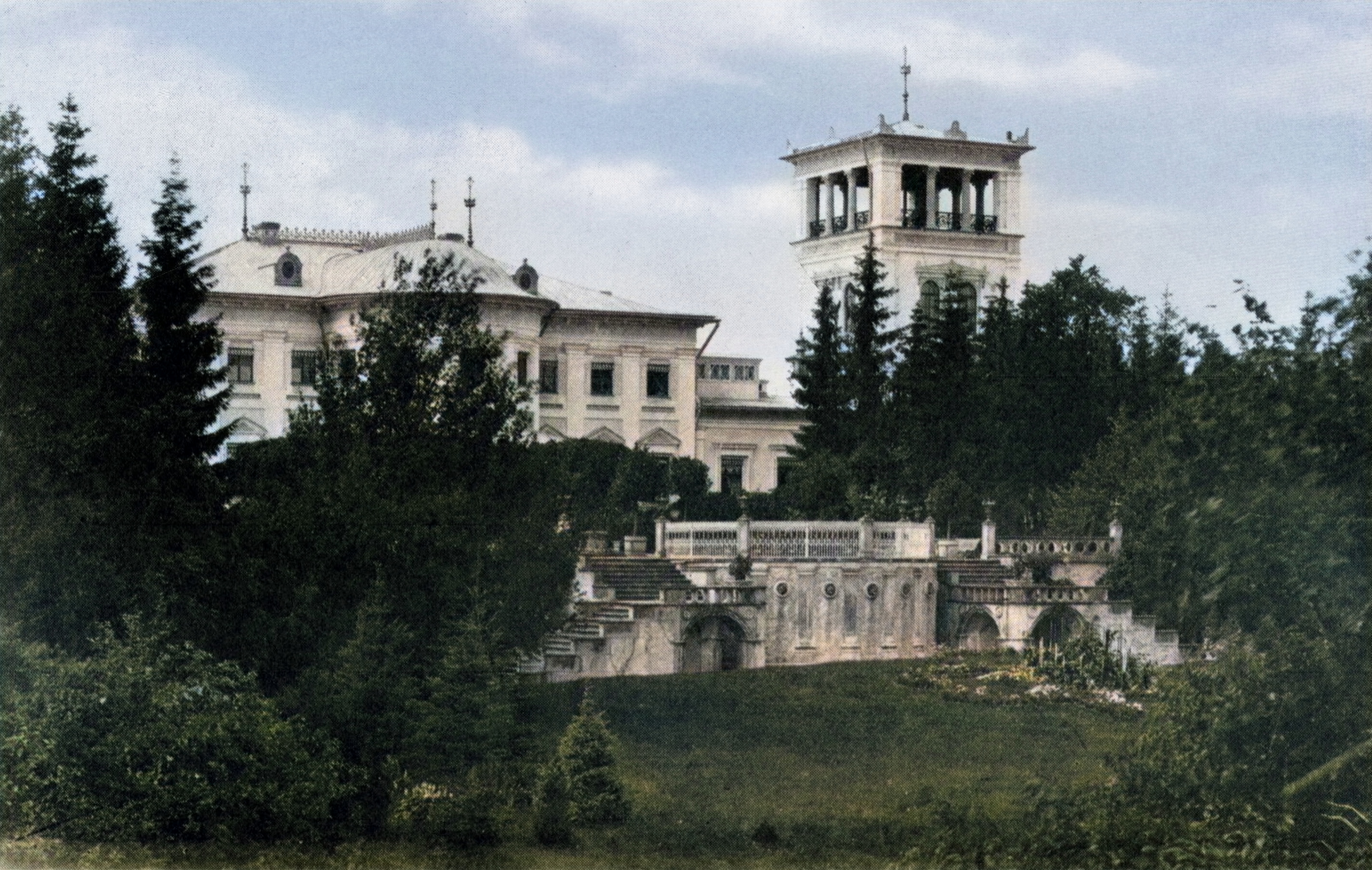
Vecgulbene White Palace in 1910

== See also ==
- List of palaces and manor houses in Latvia
