= Biksēre Manor =

Manor house in Latvia

Coordinates: 56.9225°N 26.3069°E

- Vidzeme, Latvia
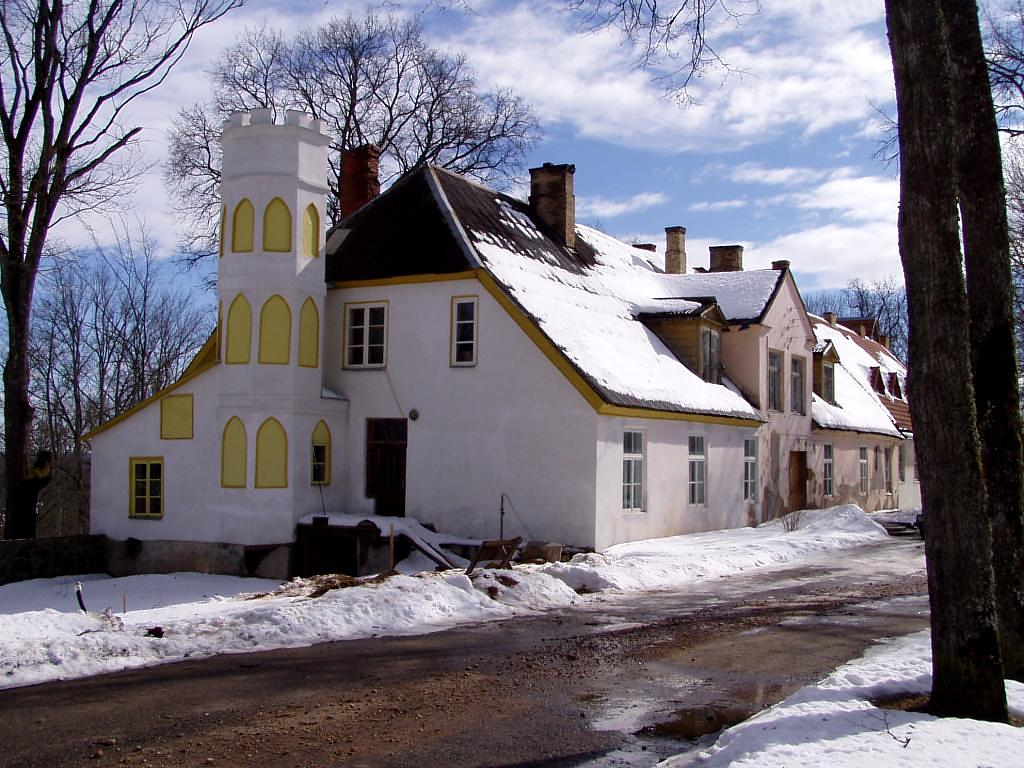

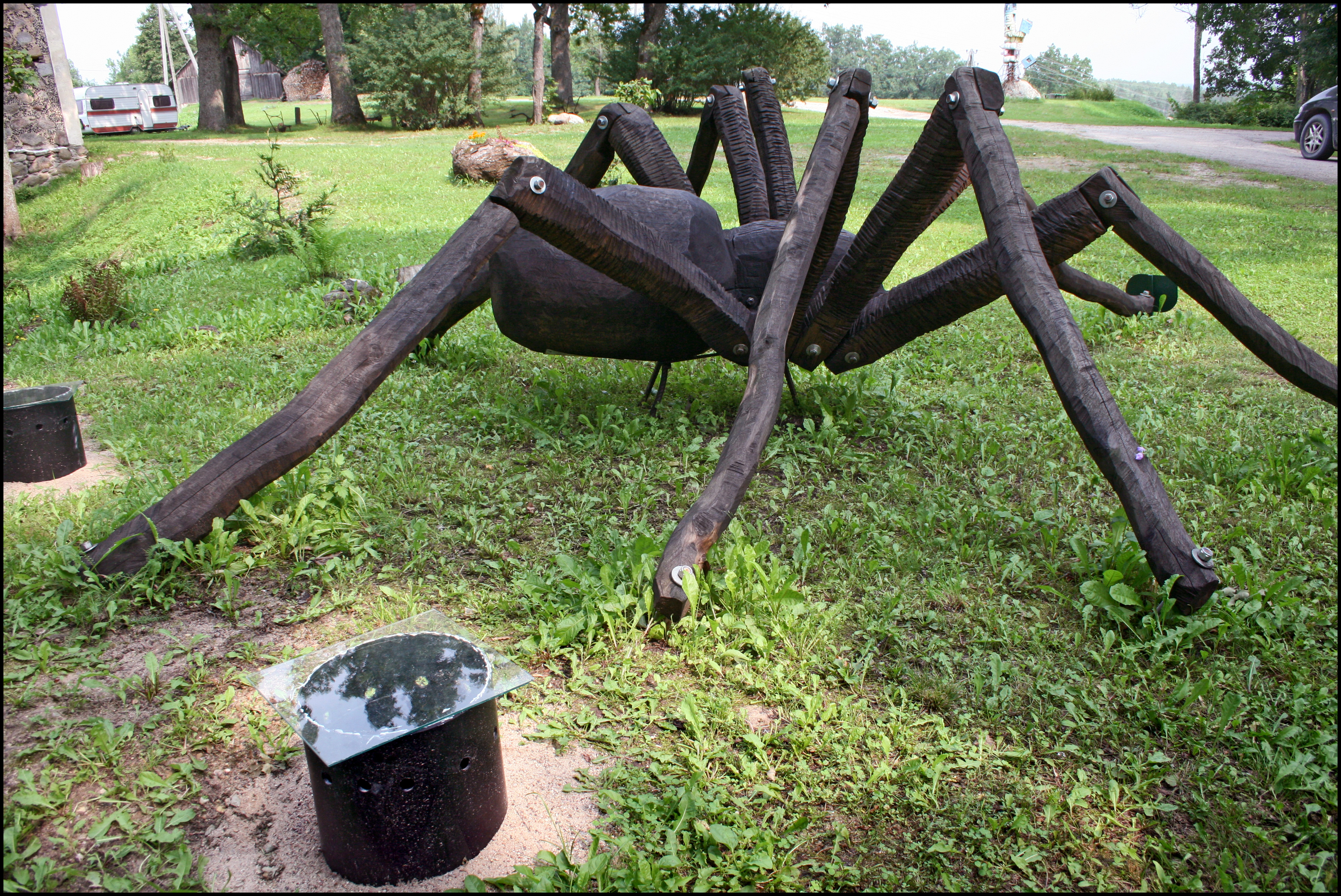
- Spider sculpture in Biksēre estate park

Site information
- Type: Manor

Biksēre Manor (Latvian: Biksēres muižas pils), also previously known as Libe Manor, is a manor house in the Sarkaņi Parish of Madona Municipality in the Vidzeme region of Latvia. The estate has a large 14.7-hectare park with 26 sculptures, and an antiques museum has been installed in the stone barn. The manor building currently houses the Sarkaņi parish administrative offices and library.

== See also ==
- List of palaces and manor houses in Latvia
