= Valdeķi Manor =

Manor house in Latvia

- Courland, Latvia
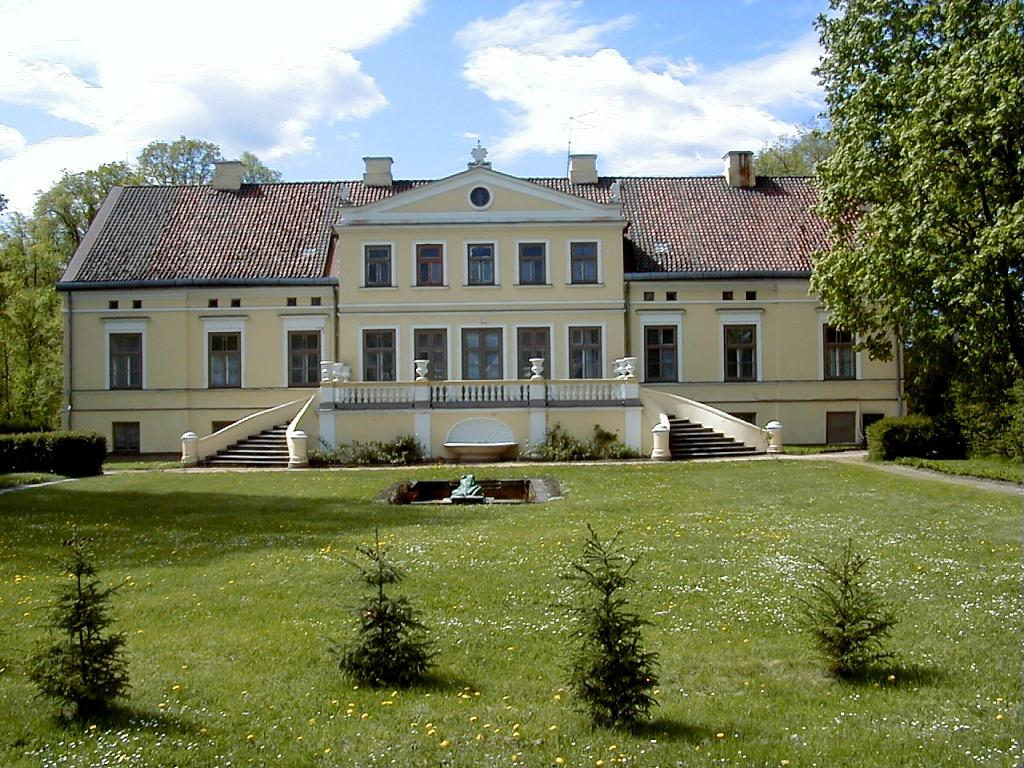

Site information
- Type: Manor

Location
- Location within Latvia
- Coordinates: 56.9992°N 22.7739°E

Valdeķi Manor (Latvian: Valdeķu muižas pils, German: Waldeck) is a manor house in Kandava Parish, Tukums Municipality in the Courland region of Latvia.

== History ==
Valdeķi manor house was built in 1882 by baron Nikolas von Koskull of Aizdzire as a shelter for the old mansions. Since 1932 it has belonged to the Latvian publisher, journalist and writer Antons Benjamiņš (1860-1939), who in the late 1930s established a model farm in Latvia - the pearl of rural Latvia. After his death in 1939, his widow Emīlija Benjamiņa was owner of property until her deportation to a Soviet labor camp in 1941. The Benjamiņš family recovered ownership in 1995, and since 1998 building now also house to museum dedicated to photographer and film producer Juris Benjamiņš, the adopted son of Antons and Emīlija.

== See also ==
- List of palaces and manor houses in Latvia
