= Lubeja Manor =

Manor in Latvia

- Location within Latvia

General information
- Architectural style: Preserved
- Location: Liezēre Parish, Madona Municipality, Vidzeme, Latvia
- Coordinates: 56°56′30.8″N 25°57′29.0″E

Lubeja Manor (Latvian: Lubejas muižas; German: Gut Lubey, Gut Lubei) is a manor in Liezēre Parish, Madona Municipality in the Vidzeme region of Latvia.

== History ==
Lubey estate was an old possession of the Tiesenhausen noble family. George Tiesenhausen Helmold's son pledged this property in 1570 to Fromhold Ungern for 2000 marks, who seemed to have ceded his right to George Tolcke Von Fromhold Tiesenhausen redeemed his widow, who was married to Johann Neutstedt in a second marriage. In 1594 Lubey estate was confiscated at the beginning of the Swedish rule along with other Tiesenhausen estates because the owner had followed the Poles. In 1625 King Gustavus Adolphus of Sweden donates an estate to Captain Gottfried Falckenberg.

On 1 September 1667 the assessor Johann Gottfried von Falckenberg sold Lubey to the Landrath and Colonel Otto von Mengden, whose grandson the General Lieutenant and Landrath Carl Friedrich Baron Mengden, for 5500 Thaler Alb, sold to the Landrath Valentin Johann von Krüdener. Minister Burchard Alerius Constantin von Krüdener surrendered both estates on 7 September 1784, for 19,000 thalers to the district administrator Ludwig Wilhelm Grafen Mannteufel the Lubey united with the Gut Bersohn with which it has remained associated since then.

Lubeja manor estate existed until 1866 when according to new law it was reformed into Lubeja parish. Parish was dissolved in 1949.

== See also ==
- List of palaces and manor houses in Latvia
- Vecpiebalga Castle
