= Kalnmuiža Manor =

Manor house in Latvia

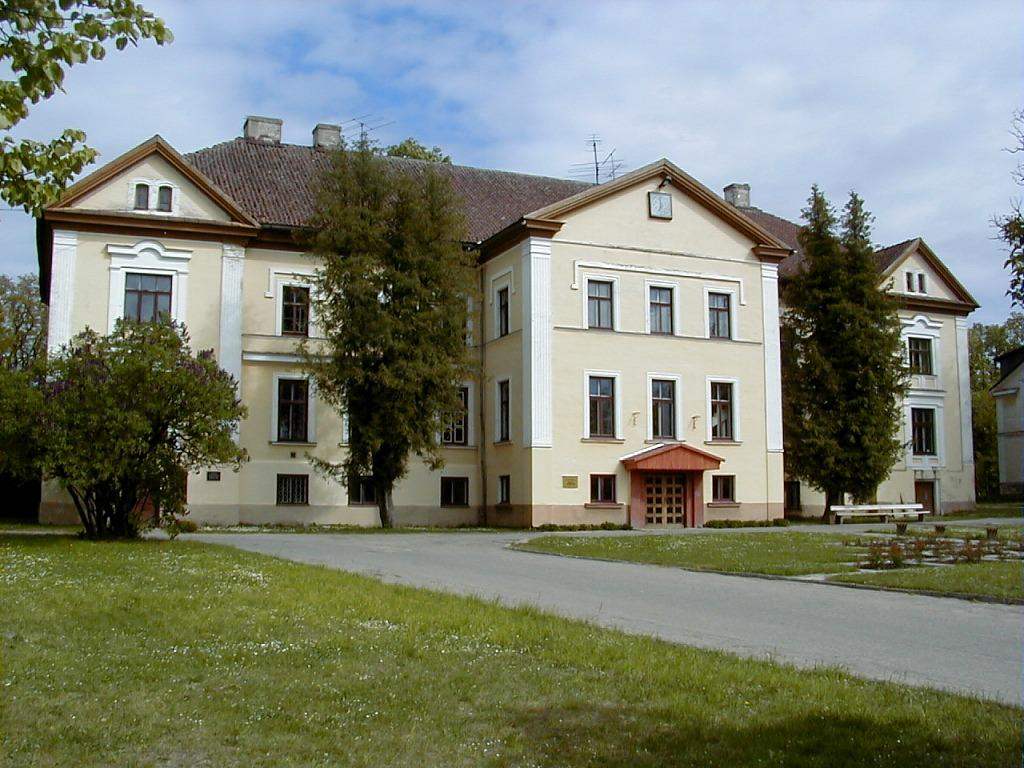

- Location within Latvia

General information
- Location: Saldus, Saldus Municipality, Courland, Kalnsētas 24, Saldus, Saldus pilsēta, LV-3801, Latvia, Latvia
- Coordinates: 56°40′00″N 22°30′53″E
- Completed: 1874

Kalnmuiža Manor (Latvian: Kalnsētu muiža) is a manor house built in the Late Classicism style in Saldus, Saldus Municipality in the historical region of Courland, in western Latvia.

== History ==
The manor ensemble is divided into two parts - the entertainment and utility part. The utility area of the estate is composed of the servant's house, barn, accessible stables, gardener's cottage in the garden and a greenhouse. Also a brewery is located in a private sector.

Baron Georg von der Recke named the estate Beronhoff or Kalnmuiža (Kalnsētas) in Latvian.

The current manor house was built in Neo-classical style and completed in 1874. Georg's son Friedrich von der Recke inherited the property in 1900 and managed the estate until the first years of the Independent Republic of Latvia. After the First World War, the Saldus Gymnasium and later the Saldus Agricultural School were housed in the property. Now Saldus Technical School is residing in historic manor building.

== See also ==
- List of palaces and manor houses in Latvia
