= Aumeisteri Manor =

Manor in Latvia

- Vidzeme, Latvia
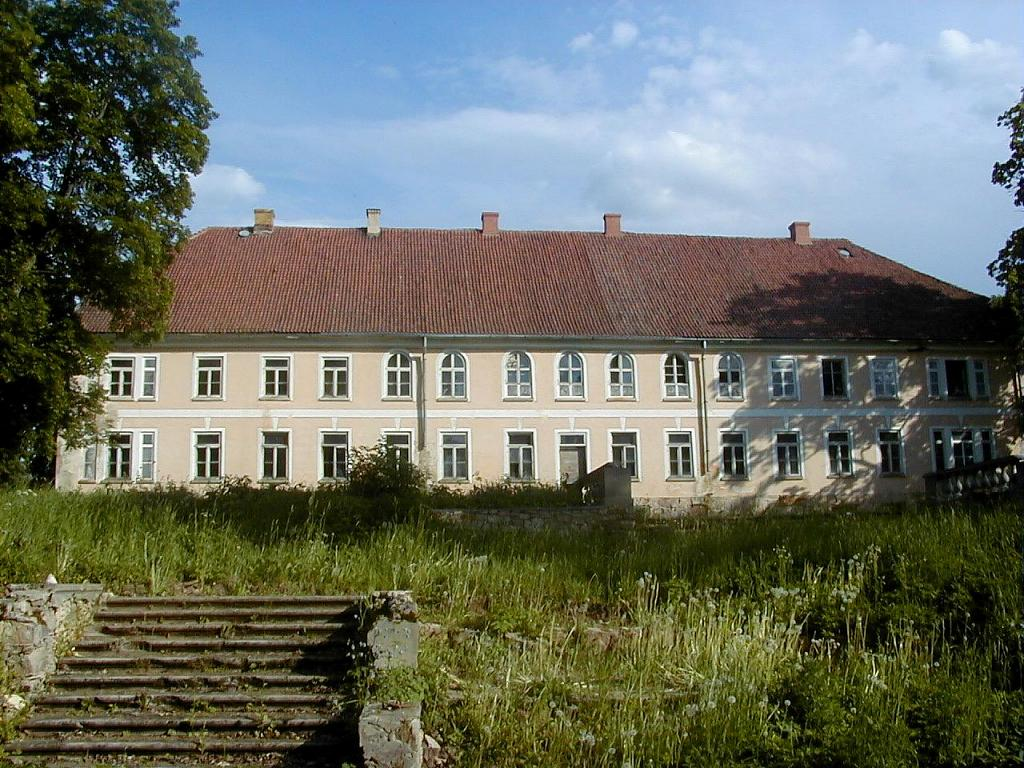

Site information
- Type: Manor

Location
- Coordinates: 57.52267690607566°N 26.202667608433668°E

Site history
- Built: After 1750

Aumeisteri Manor (Latvian: Aumeisteru muižas pils, German: Hofmeistershof), also called Cirgaļi Manor (German: Serbigal), is a manor house built by Baron Johann von Wulf in the Grundzāle Parish of Smiltene Municipality in the Vidzeme region of Latvia, after 1750 and reconstructed in 1793.

== See also ==
- List of palaces and manor houses in Latvia
