= Pastende Manor =

Manor house in Latvia

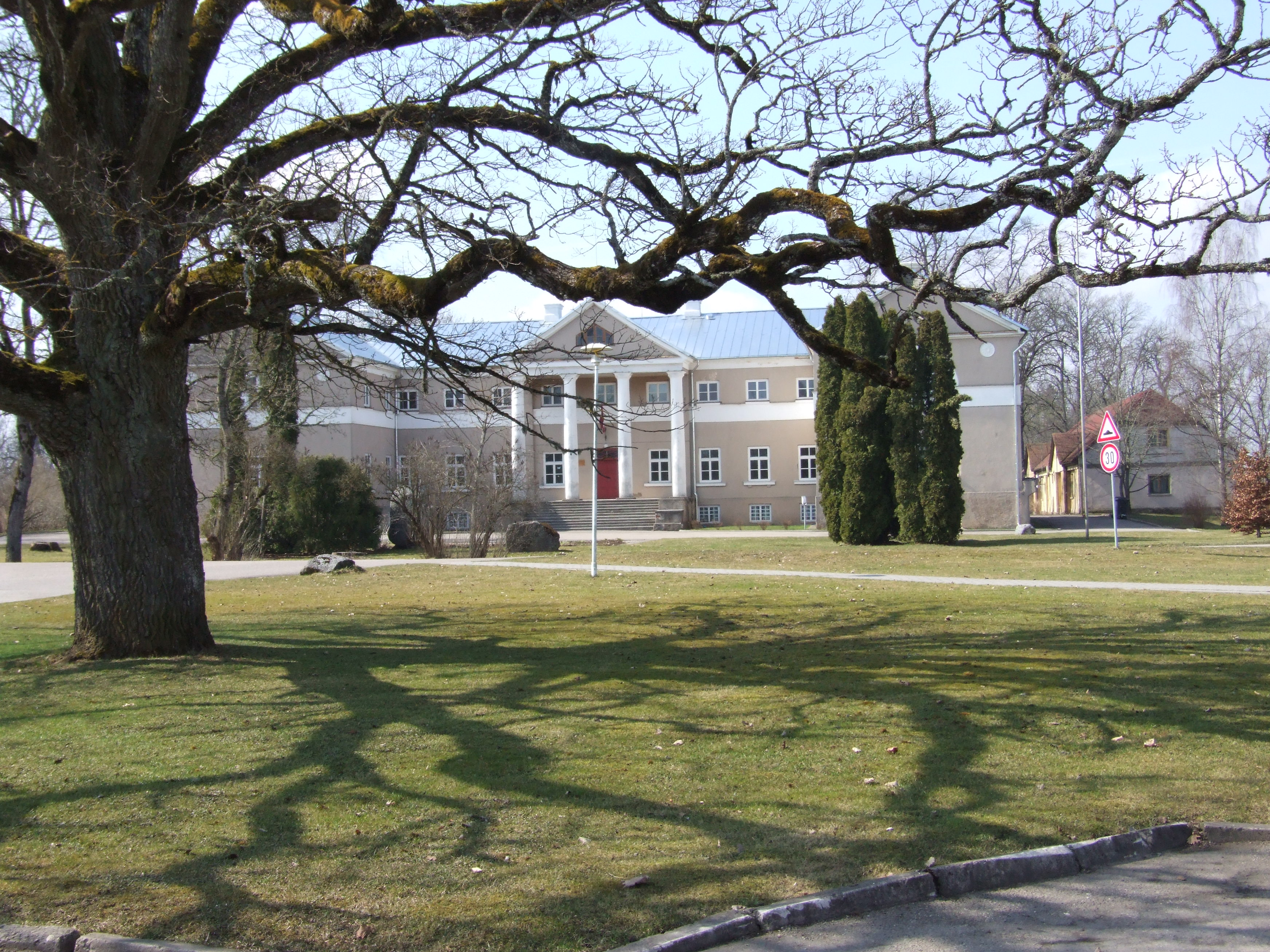

- Location within Latvia

General information
- Location: Courland, Latvia
- Coordinates: 57°13′26″N 22°31′10″E
- Construction started: 1700
- Completed: 1800

Pastende Manor (Latvian: Pastendes muižas pils) is a manor house in the Ģibuļi Parish of Talsi Municipality in the Courland region of Latvia. Originally built in 1700, it was remodeled between 1780 and 1800. Since 1945 the building has housed the Pastende primary school.

== See also ==
- List of palaces and manor houses in Latvia
