= Rudbārži Palace =

Palace in Latvia

- Courland, Latvia
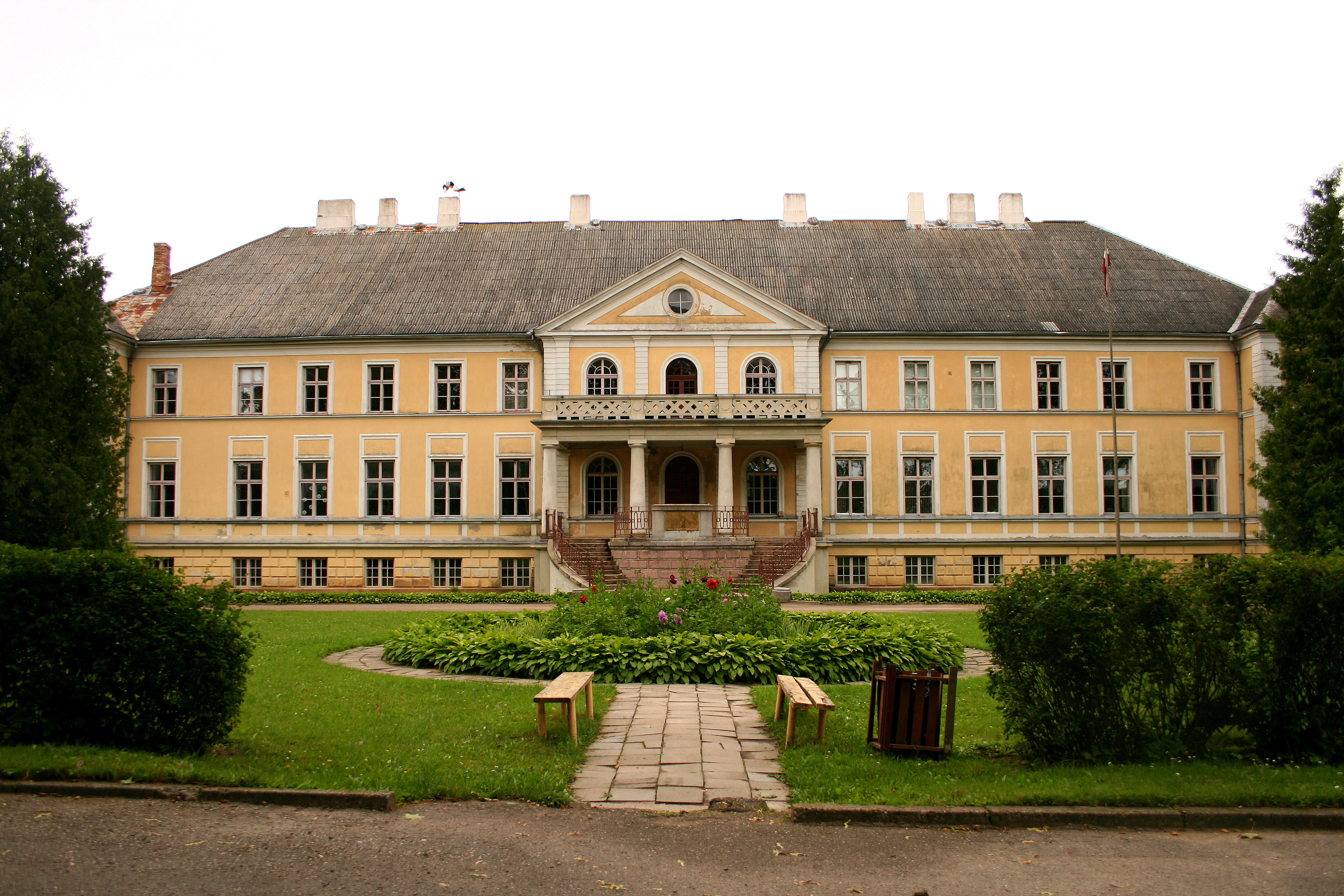

Site information
- Type: Palace

Location
- Coordinates: 56°38′41″N 21°53′18″E

Rudbārži Palace (Latvian: Rudbāržu muižas pils, German: Schloss Rudbahren) is a palace in Rudbārži Parish, Kuldīga Municipality in the Courland region in Latvia.

== History ==
The estate was, from 16th century to 1661, owned by the family of Eberhard von Goes and from 1778 till 1920 by the von Fircks noble family. Schloss Rudbahren was originally built (within the Courland Governorate) in 1835 for Baroness Thea von Fircks and was remodeled in 1882–1883. The structure was severely damaged by a fire set by revolutionaries in 1905 but rebuilding began in 1908.

During the Latvian independence struggle of 1919, Rudbārži Palace was a base for the Oskars Kalpaks Battalion (the 1st Latvian Independent Battalion). The bodies of Kalpaks himself and other officers who fell in the actions of March 1919 against the Bolsheviks were brought from the place of skirmish to lie in the Hall. In 1937 a rest home for Latvian soldiers was established there, and a commemorative plaque was unveiled on the building. Following further destruction in 1938, there was a second reconstruction. During World War Two the palace served as a German field hospital, and was further damaged, and after the War it was used as a school for forestry workers.

From 1962 until 2017 the palace housed the Rudbārži Elementary School, which took on the name of the Oskars Kalpaks Elementary School. The commemorative plaque was rediscovered and remounted in its former position in recent years. The building has been granted state protection as a Cultural Monument for its association with Kalpaks: the domed oval hall has been restored at great expense and renamed the "Heroes' Hall".

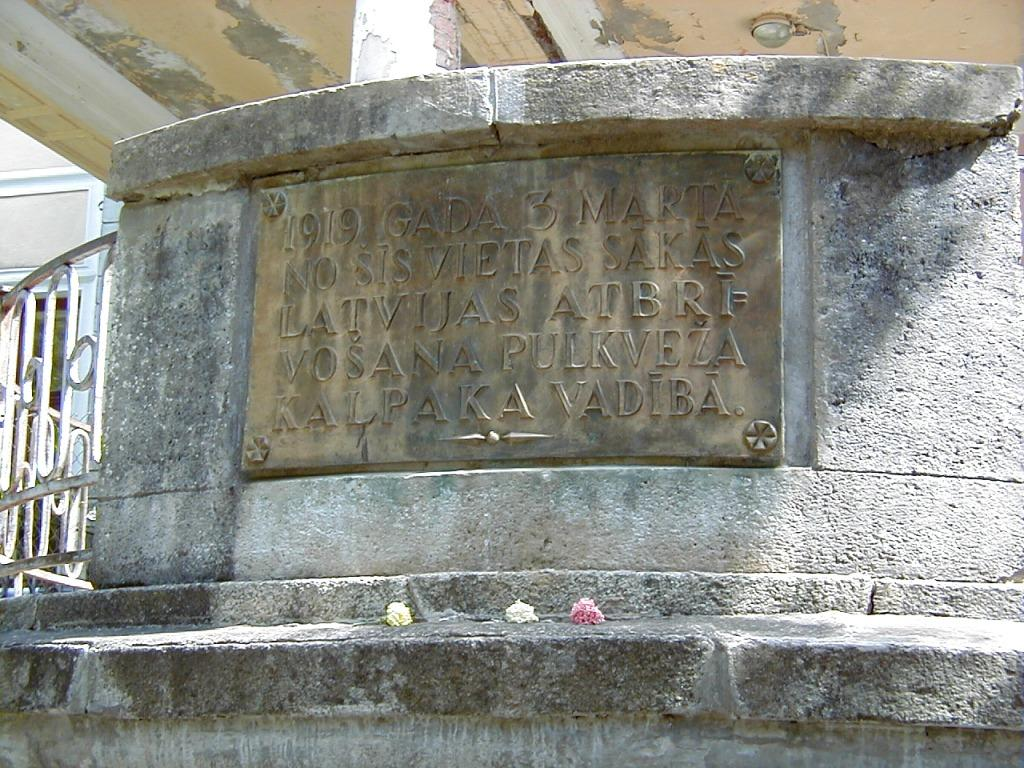
The commemorative plaque at Rudbārži

The school closed owing to lack of pupils in 2017 and the house became a military centre for the New Guard.

== See also ==
- List of palaces and manor houses in Latvia
