= Sērmūkši Manor =

Manor house in Latvia

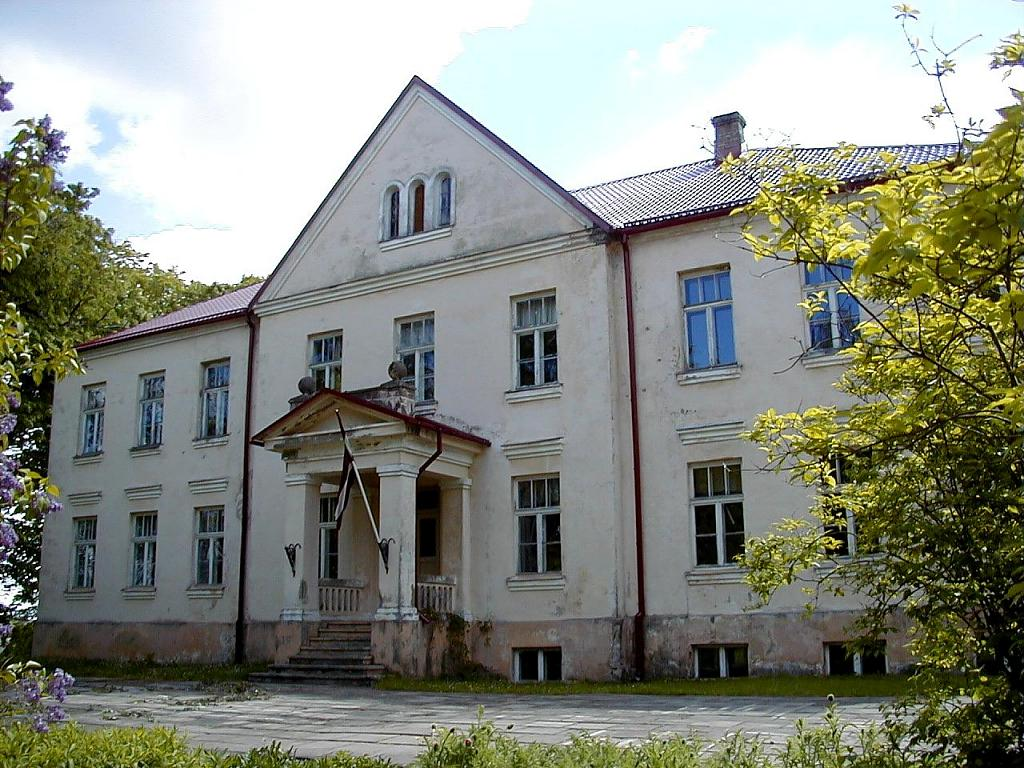
- Sērmūkši school built in 1936 on the site of former manor.

- Location within Latvia

General information
- Status: Destroyed by fire, new school built on the same site.
- Location: Cēsis Municipality, Vidzeme, Latvia, Latvia
- Coordinates: 57°07′20″N 25°30′47″E
- Demolished: 1905

Sērmūkši Manor (Latvian: Sērmūkšu muižas pils, German: Schloss Sermus) was a manor house in Cēsis Municipality in the Vidzeme region of Latvia. It was burned down in 1905 and never rebuilt.

== History ==
A new structure for the Sērmūkši school was built in 1936 on the site of the former manor house.

== See also ==
- List of palaces and manor houses in Latvia
