= Veselava Manor =

Manor house in Latvia

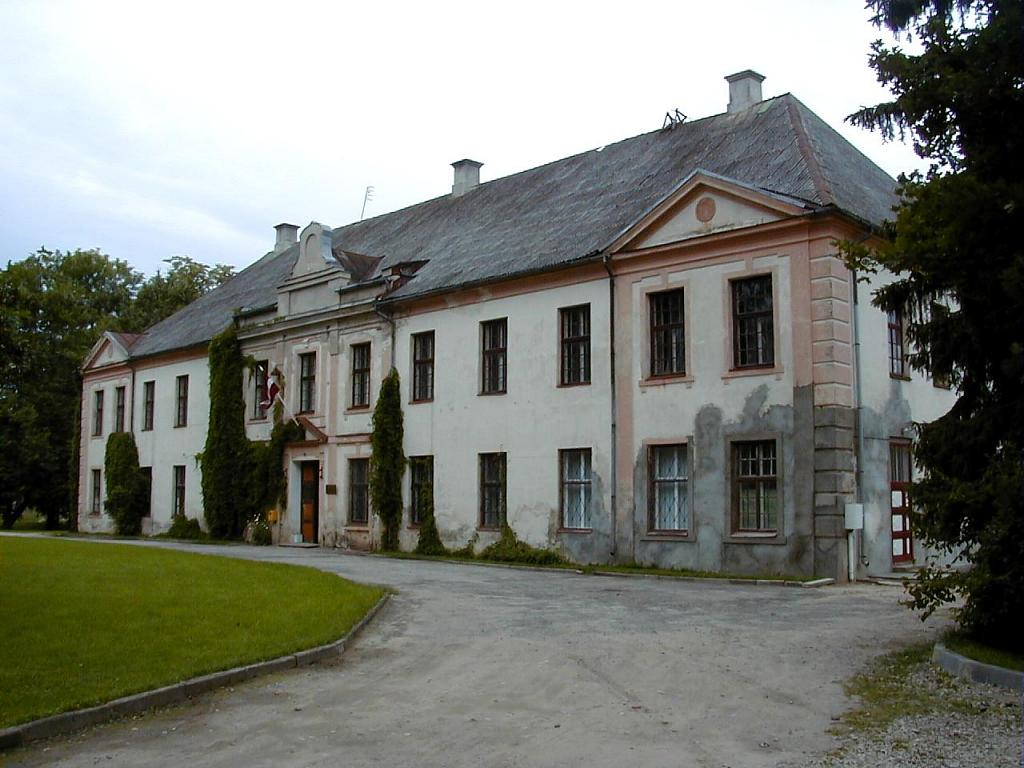

- Location within Latvia

General information
- Location: Vidzeme, Latvia
- Coordinates: 57°17′24″N 25°28′39″E
- Completed: 1841
- Client: von Campenhausen family

Veselava Manor (Latvian: Veselavas muižas pils; German: Wesselshof) is a manor house in the Veselava Parish of Cēsis Municipality in the Vidzeme region of Latvia.

== History ==
Veselava Manor was built in 1841 in Eclectic style for the von Campenhausen family, who owned the estate from 1797 until 1921. The building currently houses the Veselava parish administrative offices, community center, post office, credit union, and internet café.

== See also ==
- List of palaces and manor houses in Latvia
