= Šēnheida Manor =

Manor house in Latvia

- Šēnheidas muiža
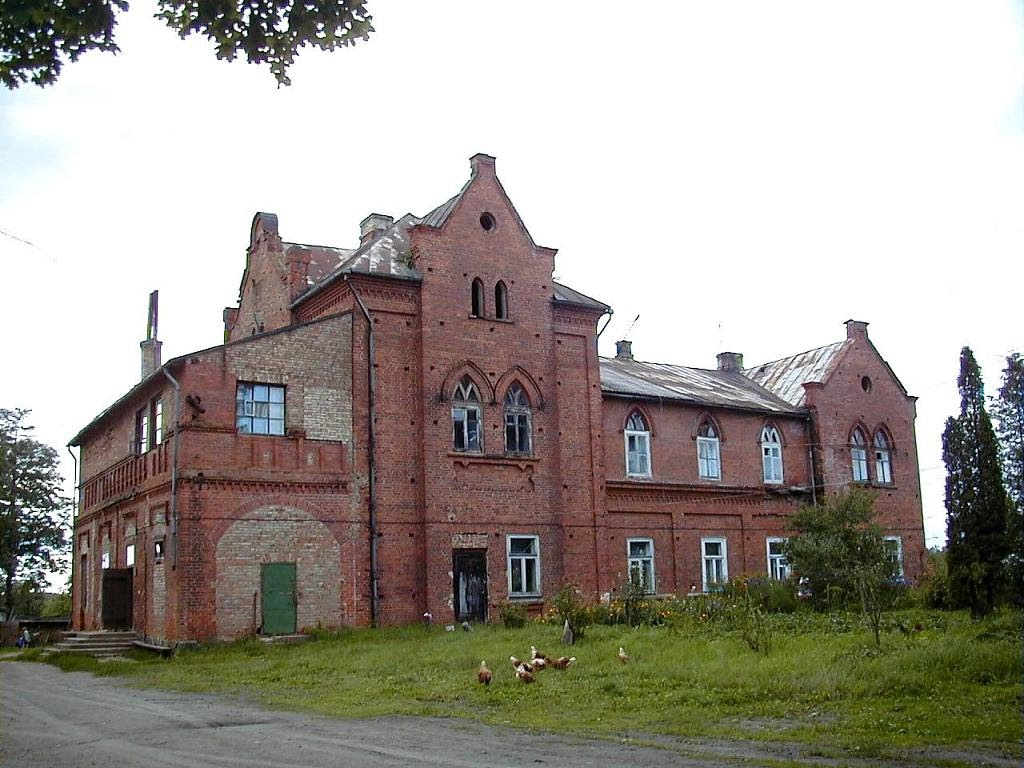
- Šēnheida Manor House

- Location within Latvia

General information
- Architectural style: Neo Gothic
- Location: Šengeida, Skrudaliena Parish, Augšdaugava Municipality, Latvia
- Coordinates: 55°45′16″N 26°44′36″E
- Completed: 1870
- Client: Eugen von Engelhardt

Šēnheida Manor, also called Šengeida Manor, (German: Schönheyden) is a manor house in Šengeida (Šēnheida), Skrudaliena Parish, Augšdaugava Municipality in the Selonia region of Latvia.

== History ==
From 1749 to 1920, when the agrarian reform began, the property belonged to the Engelhardt family. After the agrarian reform divided the estate, the Engelhardt family retained ownership of the manor house. The Baltic Germans continued to coordinate activities on their former estate until they emigrated to Germany in 1939. After the Second World War, the manor house was used for storing grain. Today eight families live in the building.

== See also ==
- List of palaces and manor houses in Latvia
