= Katvari Manor =

Manor house in Latvia

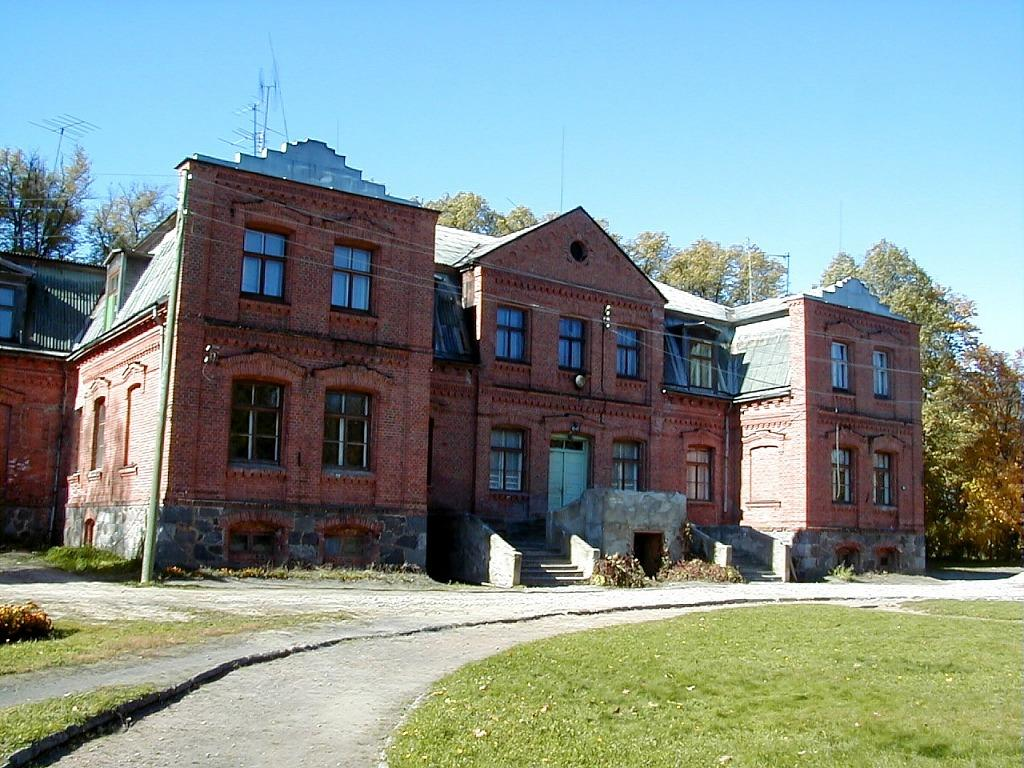

- Location within Latvia

General information
- Location: Katvari Parish, Limbaži Municipality, Vidzeme, Latvia
- Coordinates: 57°33′27″N 24°48′01″E

Katvari Manor (Latvian: Katvaru muižas pils) is a manor house in Katvari, Katvari Parish, Limbaži Municipality, in the historical region of Vidzeme, in northern Latvia.

== History ==
Originally built in the middle of the 18th century, red brick outer walls were added during the 19th century. From 1920 to 2008 the building housed the Katvari primary school.

== See also ==
- List of palaces and manor houses in Latvia
