= Rikava Manor =

Manor house in Latvia

- Latgale, Latvia
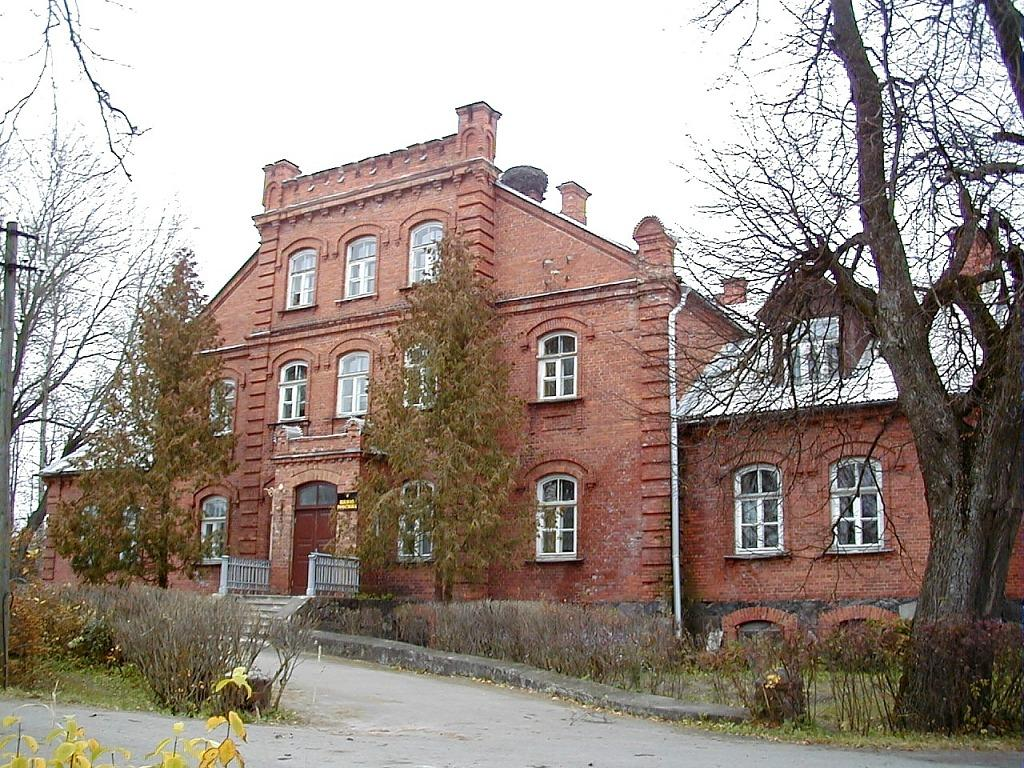

Site information
- Type: Manor

Location
- Coordinates: 56°37′17.6″N 27°02′47.7″E

Rikava Manor is a manor in Rikava Parish, Rēzekne Municipality in the historical region of Latgale, in Latvia. The complex includes a castle, park and three other buildings.

== History ==
Rikava estate was the property of the Janovski noble family. In the second half of the 18th century Mihals von Rick bought the estate. The red brick manor house in Neo Gothic style was built from 1870 to 1875. After Latvian agrarian reform of 1920s manor was the property of the state and since 1926 the manor house has been the site of Rikava Elementary School.

== See also ==
- List of palaces and manor houses in Latvia
