= Pasiene Manor =

Manor house in Latvia

- Latgale, Latvia
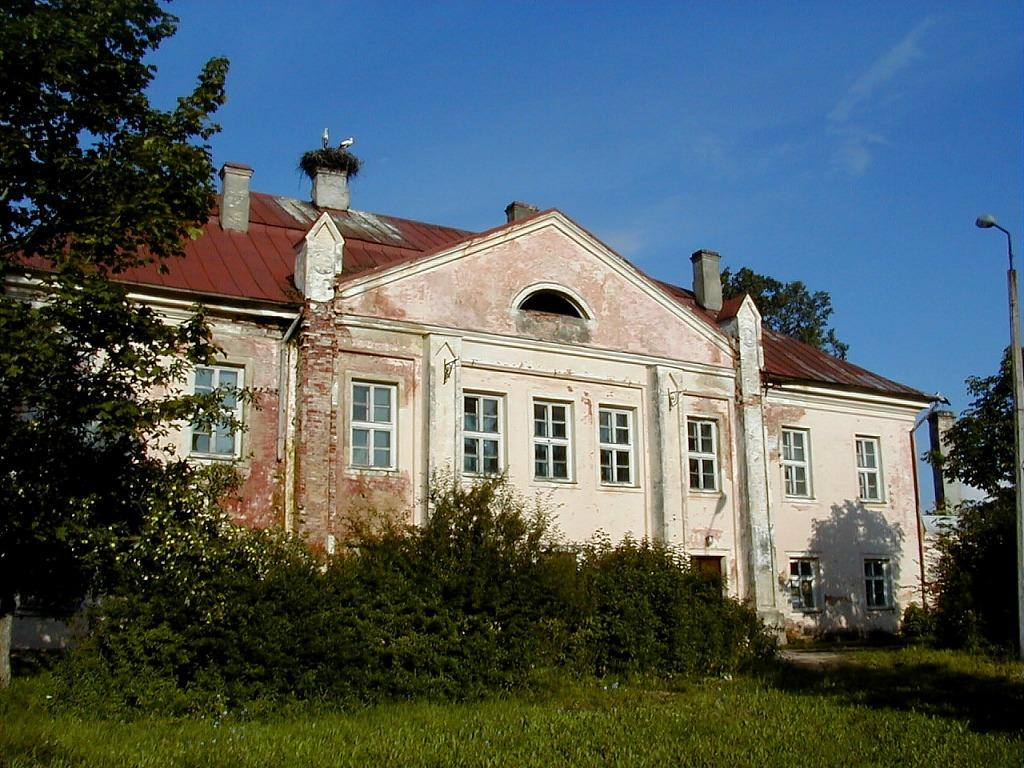

Site information
- Type: Manor

Location
- Coordinates: 56°17′37.0″N 28°09′34.2″E

Pasiene Manor is a manor in Pasiene Parish, Ludza Municipality in the historical region of Latgale, in Latvia.

== History ==
In the 17th century, Pasiene Manor belonged to Demkin, who built the first manor house. In the 18th century, the Augustus III of Poland gifted the Pasiene estate to the Chief Chancellor Jānis Borhs, who built the Pasiene Catholic Church. At the end of the 18th century, the estate was acquired by the Benislavski noble family. The Pasiene Manor house was built in the 1850s by the landlord Benislavski for his daughter S. Tehanovecka. In 19th century, the Manor was sold to Prince M. Obolensky. The last owner of the estate was Countess Obolenska. After the war, the main tenant at Pasiene Manor was Pasiene Elementary School. Presently, the manor house is privatized and needs renovation. It still serves as a parish folk house and has a library and a room used by the Polish Society.

== See also ==
- List of palaces and manor houses in Latvia
