= Odziena Manor =

Manor house in Latvia

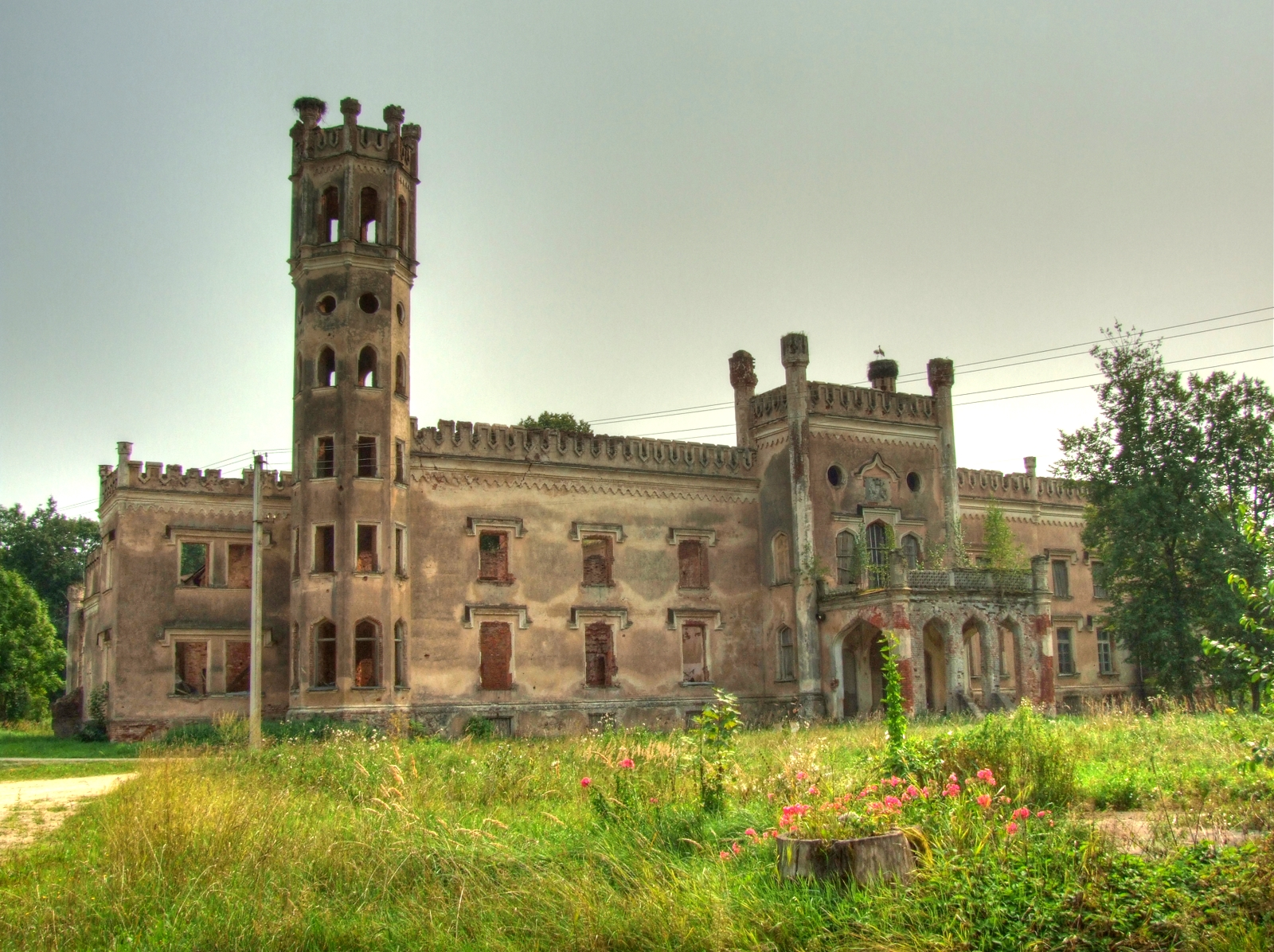
- Interactive map of the Odziena Manor area

General information
- Architectural style: Neo-Gothic
- Location: Aizkraukle Municipality, Latvia
- Coordinates: 56°42′45″N 25°41′09″E
- Completed: 1860s
- Client: Rudolph Friedrich Adrian von Brimmer

Odziena Manor (Latvian: Odzienas muižas pils; German: Schloss Odensee) is a manor house built in Neo-Gothic style around 1860 in Vietalva Parish, Aizkraukle Municipality in the Vidzeme region of Latvia.

== History ==
First manor building in this place was built in the end of the 18th century. In the 19th century, the manor became property of the von Brimmer family and in the 1860s a new neo-Gothic building was built. It was one of the most impressive neo-Gothic buildings in Latvia. It was heavily damaged by fire in Revolution of 1905 and only partially restored after it. In the 1920s, Odziena Manor was nationalized in accordance with Latvian Land Reform of 1920. The building has been abandoned since 1960.

In 2014, with the assistance of European Union structural funds, a brewery, Odzienas muižas alus, was started in the mill-bakery of the manor. Besides the brewery, a small hotel has been opened in the manor.

== See also ==
- List of palaces and manor houses in Latvia
