= Beļava Manor =

Manor house in Latvia

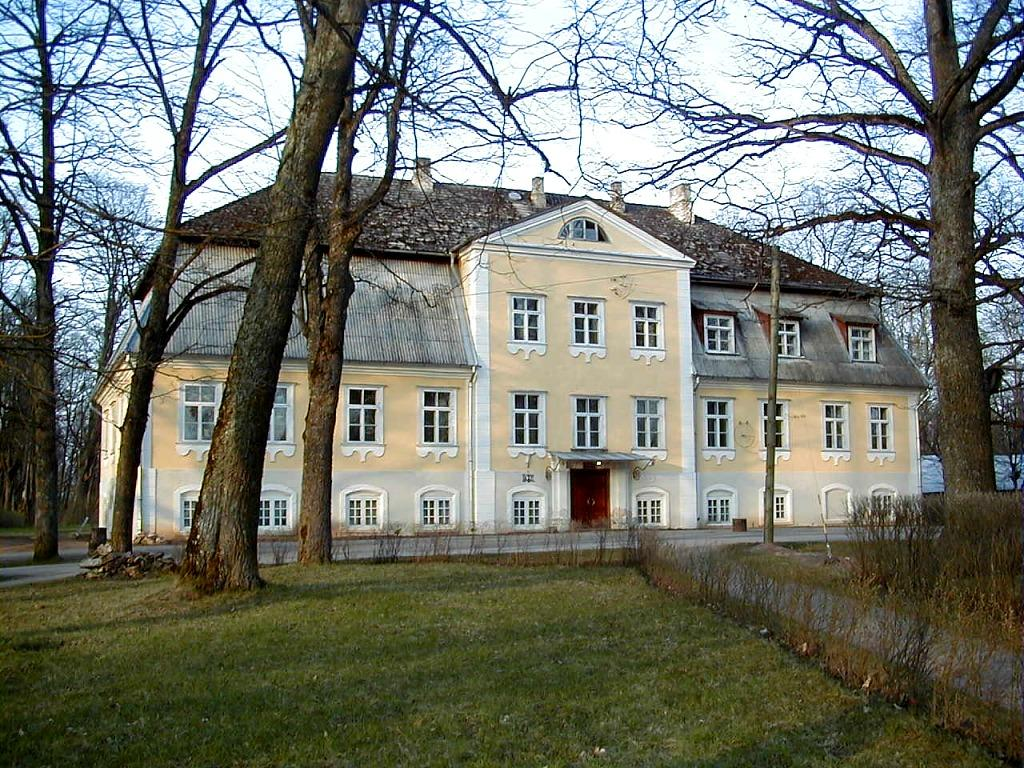

- Location within Latvia

General information
- Location: Pilskalns, Beļava Parish, Gulbene Municipality, Vidzeme, Liepu iela 4, Pilskalns, Beļavas pagasts, LV-4409,, Latvia
- Coordinates: 57°17′22″N 26°47′24″E

Beļava Manor (Latvian: Beļavas muižas pils) is a manor house in Pilskalns, Beļava Parish, Gulbene Municipality, in historical region of Vidzeme, in northern Latvia.

== History ==
It was built around 1760 in Baroque style. The building currently houses the Krišjānis Valdemārs primary school.

== See also ==
- List of palaces and manor houses in Latvia
