= Juzefinova Manor =

Manor house in Latvia

- Latgale, Latvia
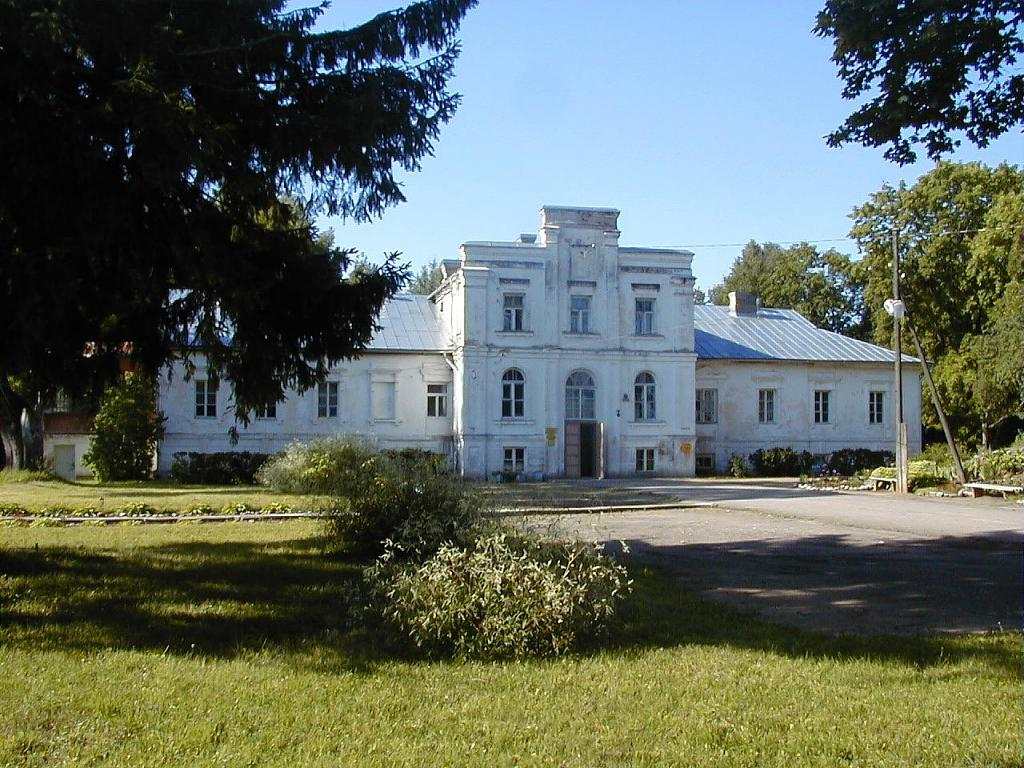

Site information
- Type: Manor

Location
- Coordinates: 56°08′27.2″N 26°49′29″E

Juzefinova Manor (Latvian: Juzefinovas muiža) is a manor in Ārdava, Pelēči Parish, Preiļi Municipality in the historical region of Latgale, in Latvia.

== History ==
Construction was begun in 1860 and completed in 1863. Until 1922 the property belonged to the Mohl family. Upon opening of the railway line around the center of the former Jezufinov Manor settlement Ārdava was formed. The Manor building was the site of the Ārdava primary school from 1922 to 2003.

== See also ==
- List of palaces and manor houses in Latvia
