= Palsmane Parish =

Parish of Latvia

- parish of Latvia
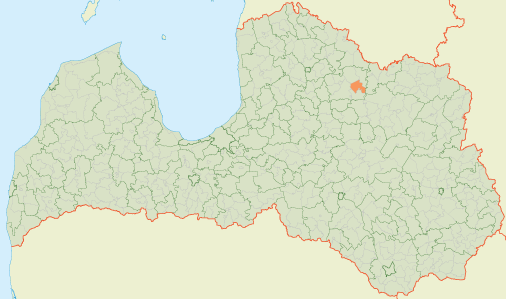
- Coordinates: 57°22′58″N 26°10′00″E
- Country: Latvia

Population (1 January 2026)
  - Total: 795
- Time zone: UTC+02:00

Palsmane parish (Latvian: Palsmanes pagasts) is an administrative unit of Smiltene Municipality in the Vidzeme region of Latvia. Prior to the 2009 administrative reforms it was part of Valka district.
