= Saldus district =

District of Latvia

Coordinates: 56°40′N 22°30′E

Saldus
- District
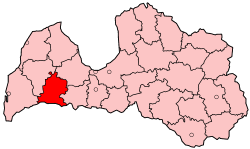
- Country: Latvia
- Created: 1949
- Dissolved: 2009

Area
  - Total: 2,182 km^{2} (842 sq mi)

Population
  - Total: 36,324
  - Density: 16.65/km^{2} (43.12/sq mi)
- Website: saldus.lv/

Saldus district (Latvian: Saldus rajons) was an administrative division of Latvia, located in Courland region, in the country's west.

The district, previously a part of Kuldīga county, was created during the Soviet occupation of Latvia in 1949. The district was divided up during the administrative-territorial reform in 2009 into Brocēni Municipality and Saldus Municipality. In 2021 they were merged again into a new Saldus Municipality.

== Cities and parishes ==
- Saldus city
- Brocēni town
- Ezere Parish
- Gaiķi Parish
- Jaunauce Parish
- Jaunlutriņi Parish
- Kursīši Parish
- Lutriņi Parish
- Nīgrande Parish
- Novadnieki Parish
- Pampāļi Parish
- Ruba Parish
- Saldus Parish
- Šķēde Parish
- Vadakste Parish
- Zaņa Parish
- Zirņi Parish
- Zvārde Parish

== Culture ==
Zvērā was an annual non-commercial rock music festival held near Lašupe, Lutriņi Parish.
