= Saldus Municipality (2009–2021) =

Municipality of Latvia

Coordinates: 56°40′N 22°30′E

Saldus Municipality Saldus novads
- Municipality
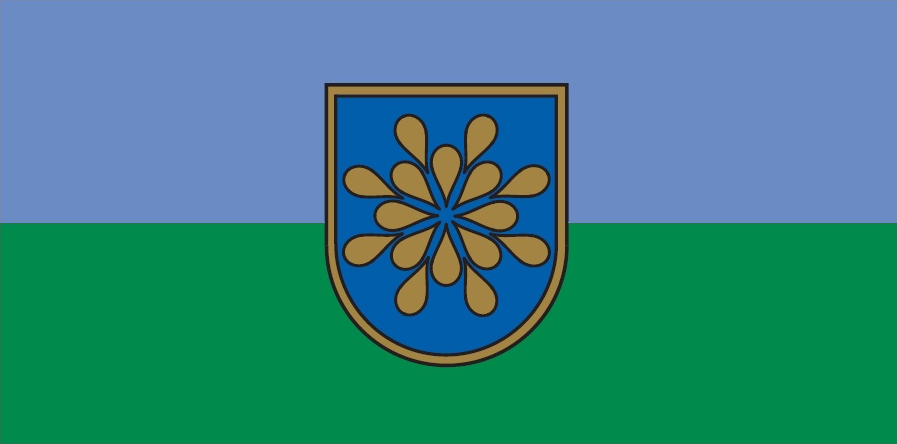
- Flag Coat of arms

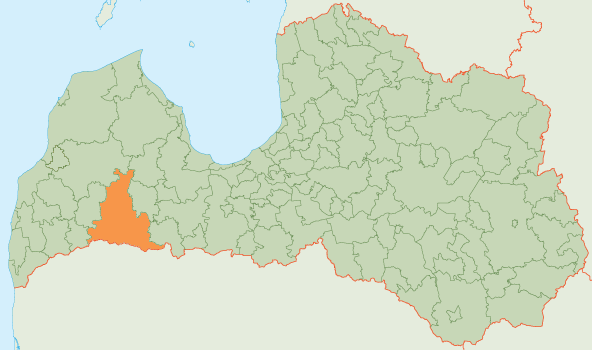
- Country: Latvia
- Formed: 2009
- Dissolved: 2021
- Centre: Saldus

Government
  - Council Chair: Māris Zusts (LZP)

Area
  - Total: 1,682.86 km^{2} (649.76 sq mi)
  - Land: 1,641.11 km^{2} (633.64 sq mi)
  - Water: 41.75 km^{2} (16.12 sq mi)

Population (2021)
  - Total: 21,438
  - Density: 13.063/km^{2} (33.833/sq mi)
- Website: saldus.lv

The former Saldus Municipality (Latvian: Saldus novads) was a municipality in Courland, Latvia. The municipality was formed in 2009 by merging parts of the former Saldus district: Saldus town (municipal centre), Ezere Parish, Jaunauce Parish, Jaunlutriņi Parish, Kursīši Parish, Lutriņi Parish, Nīgrande Parish, Novadnieki Parish, Pampāļi Parish, Ruba Parish, Saldus Parish, Šķēde Parish, Vadakste Parish, Zaņa Parish, Zirņi Parish and Zvārde Parish.

On 1 July 2021 the municipality was merged with Brocēni Municipality into the new Saldus Municipality. The population in 2020 was 21,587.

== Population ==
Territorial unit	Population (year)
Ezere parish	1121 (2018)
Jaunauce parish	342 (2018)
Jaunlutriņi parish	739 (2018)
Kursīši parish	807 (2018)
Lutriņi parish	1286 (2018)
Nīgrande parish	1347 (2018)
Novadnieki parish	1652 (2018)
Pampāļi parish	597 (2018)
Ruba parish	715 (2018)
Saldus	10810 (2018)
Saldus parish	1549 (2018)
Šķēde parish	572 (2018)
Vadakste parish	406 (2018)
Zaņa parish	624 (2018)
Zirņi parish	1564 (2018)
Zvārde parish	385 (2018)

== Patron of the University of Latvia ==
Since 2013, Saldus Municipality was a Silver Patron of the University of Latvia Foundation. The scholarship “Medusmaize” was intended for young people of their region who, after graduating from high school, start basic studies in one of the Latvian universities. If the criteria are met, support was to be provided throughout the bachelor's degree.

== Twin towns — sister cities ==
Saldus is twinned with:

- Mažeikiai, Lithuania
- Nevarėnai, Lithuania
- Šilutė, Lithuania
- Paide, Estonia
- Stargard, Poland
- Florești, Moldova
- Lidingö, Sweden
- Liederbach am Taunus, Germany
- Sankt Andrä, Austria
- Sergiyev Posad, Russia
- (Georgia (country)) Tsqaltubo, Georgia
- Villebon-sur-Yvette, France
- Volda, Norway
