= Zvārde Parish =

Parish of Latvia

- parish of Latvia
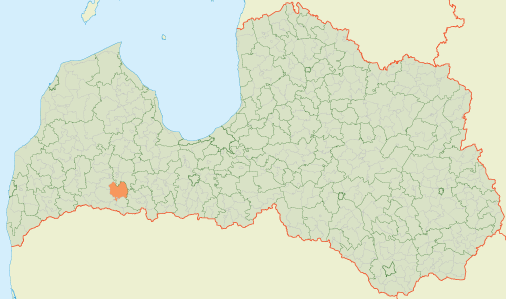
- 56°33′13″N 22°36′12″E
- Country: Latvia

Area
  - Total: 205.03 km^{2} (79.16 sq mi)
  - Land: 202.68 km^{2} (78.26 sq mi)
  - Water: 2.35 km^{2} (0.91 sq mi)

Population (1 January 2025)
  - Total: 299
  - Density: 1.48/km^{2} (3.82/sq mi)

Zvārde Parish (Latvian: Zvārdes pagasts) is an administrative unit in the Eastern part of Saldus Municipality in the Courland region of Latvia. It borders with the Novadnieki, Kursīši, Ruba and Jaunauce parishes, Brocēni Municipality Ciecere and Blīdene parishes and Auce Municipality Lielauces and Vītiņu parishes.

== History ==
The territory of present-day Zvārde parish in the 19 century was divided between Jaunzvārde manor ( Gut Neu-Schwarden ), Ķerkliņi manor ( Gut Kerklingen ), Striķi manor ( Gut Stricken , Striķi), Veczvārde manor ( Gut Alt-Schwarden ).

In 1935, Kuldīga district Zvārde parish had an area of 214.1 km^{2} and 3117 inhabitants. In 1945, Ķerkliņu, Striķu and Zvārdes village councils were established in the parish, but in 1949 the parish was liquidated. In 1954, at the request of the Soviet Union Ministry of Defense, aviations Zvārde bombing range was established in most of the parish territory. The villages were liquidated and their territories were added to the villages of Novadnieki Parish (Striķi and Zvārde villages) and Lielauce Parish (Ķerkliņi village). In 1993, Zvārde the parish was re-established, including most of the territory of the former parish. In 2009, the parish was included as an administrative territory Saldus Municipality.

== Geography ==
Zvārde parish has several small rivers - Akmeņstrauts, Lemzere, Mazupe, Mežupīte, Nabagupe and lakes - Baltezers, Lake Brocēni, Lake Cieceres, Luknis, Mellezeris.
