= 2014–15 Lombard-Pápa TFC season =

Lombard-Pápa TFC
2014–15 season
- Chairman: (Hungary) Péter Bíró
- Manager: (Hungary) János Mátyus
Home colours	Away colours

The 2014–15 season will be Lombard-Pápa TFC's 8th competitive season, 6th consecutive season in the OTP Bank Liga and 19th year in existence as a football club.

== First team squad ==
Note: Flags indicate national team as defined under FIFA eligibility rules; some limited exceptions apply. Players may hold more than one non-FIFA nationality.

No.	Pos.	Nation	Player
4	DF	HUN	Gábor Tóth
5	DF	HUN	Bence Jagodics
7	FW	HUN	Milán Faggyas
8	DF	HUN	Tamás Nagy
9	FW	HUN	Róbert Waltner
10	DF	BRA	Bernardo Frizoni
11	MF	LVA	Vadims Žuļevs
13	MF	HUN	Tamás Csilus (loan from Ferencváros)
17	MF	ROU	Andrei Florean
19	MF	SVK	Marián Sluka
20	FW	HUN	Krisztián Kenesei

No.	Pos.	Nation	Player
24	MF	ROU	Andrei Coroian
25	DF	HUN	Szabolcs Gál (loan from Ferencváros)
27	GK	HUN	Lajos Szűcs
28	MF	SWE	Kristian Benkő
31	MF	HUN	Botond Király
55	DF	SRB	Milan Bogunović
61	FW	HUN	Máté Schmid
63	MF	HUN	Martin Iványi
85	DF	HUN	Csaba Csizmadia
89	FW	SRB	Saša Popin
97	MF	HUN	Bálint Böröczky

== Transfers ==
=== Summer ===
In: Note: Flags indicate national team as defined under FIFA eligibility rules; some limited exceptions apply. Players may hold more than one non-FIFA nationality.

No.	Pos.	Nation	Player
7	FW	HUN	Milán Faggyas (from Sopron)
9	FW	HUN	Róbert Waltner (from Siófok)
10	DF	BRA	Bernardo Frizoni (from Zalaegerszeg)
11	MF	LVA	Vadims Žuļevs (from (Latvia) Jelgava)
11	FW	HUN	Gergő Beliczky (loan return from Gyirmót)
13	MF	HUN	Tamás Csilus (loan from Ferencváros)
17	MF	HUN	Andrei Florean (from Kaposvár)
19	MF	SVK	Marián Sluka (from Zalaegerszeg)
24	MF	ROU	Andrei Coroian (from Kaposvár)
25	FW	HUN	Szabolcs Gál (from Ferencváros II)
28	MF	SWE	Kristian Benkő (from Rákospalota)
55	DF	SRB	Milan Bogunović (from Zalaegerszeg)
89	FW	SRB	Saša Popin (from (Romania) Săgeata Năvodari)
97	MF	HUN	Bálint Böröczky (from Pápa U-19)
—	FW	HUN	Dénes Olasz (loan from Mezőkövesd)

Out: Note: Flags indicate national team as defined under FIFA eligibility rules; some limited exceptions apply. Players may hold more than one non-FIFA nationality.

No.	Pos.	Nation	Player
2	DF	HUN	Sándor Nagy (to Gyirmót)
5	DF	HUN	András Dlusztus (to Szeged)
7	FW	HUN	István Eszlátyi (to Sopron)
9	MF	SRB	Lazar Arsić (to (Serbia) Radnički)
10	FW	SRB	Goran Marić (to Dunaújváros)
11	FW	HUN	Gergő Beliczky (to Gyirmót)
11	MF	HUN	Márk Orosz (loan return to Ferencváros)
13	DF	SVK	Peter Struhár (to (Slovakia) Dunajská Streda)
20	MF	HUN	Kornél Kulcsár (loan return to Haladás)
29	DF	HUN	Milán Németh (to Diósgyőr)
32	DF	HUN	Ádám Présinger (to Gyirmót)
50	FW	CIV	Georges Griffiths (to Diósgyőr)
77	FW	HUN	Richárd Horváth (loan to Salgótarján)
91	MF	HUN	Tamás Tajthy (to Mezőkövesd)
98	MF	MAR	Youssef Sekour (to (Morocco) Rabat)

- List of Hungarian football transfers summer 2014

== Statistics ==
=== Appearances and goals ===
Last updated on 6 December 2014.

No.	Pos	Nat	Player	Total		OTP Bank Liga		Hungarian Cup		League Cup	
No.	Pos	Nat	Player	Apps	Goals	Apps	Goals	Apps	Goals	Apps	Goals
4	DF	(Hungary) HUN	Gábor Tóth	20	0	16	0	1	0	3	0
5	DF	(Hungary) HUN	Bence Jagodics	16	0	11	0	1	0	4	0
7	FW	(Hungary) HUN	Milán Faggyas	12	0	8	0	1	0	3	0
8	DF	(Hungary) HUN	Tamás Nagy	19	1	14	1	1	0	4	0
9	FW	(Hungary) HUN	Róbert Waltner	13	0	8	0	1	0	4	0
10	DF	(Brazil) BRA	Bernardo Frizoni	21	0	16	0	1	0	4	0
11	MF	(Latvia) LVA	Vadims Žuļevs	19	1	15	1	1	0	3	0
13	MF	(Hungary) HUN	Tamás Csilus	19	0	14	0	1	0	4	0
17	MF	(Romania) ROU	Andrei Florean	9	0	7	0	0	0	2	0
19	MF	(Slovakia) SVK	Marián Sluka	17	1	14	1	1	0	2	0
20	FW	(Hungary) HUN	Krisztián Kenesei	16	1	14	0	1	0	1	1
24	MF	(Romania) ROU	Andrei Coroian	13	1	7	1	0	0	6	0
25	DF	(Hungary) HUN	Szabolcs Gál	5	0	1	0	0	0	4	0
27	GK	(Hungary) HUN	Lajos Szűcs	19	-30	17	-29	0	0	2	-1
28	MF	(Sweden) SWE	Kristian Benkő	17	2	11	0	0	0	6	2
31	MF	(Hungary) HUN	Botond Király	14	0	8	0	1	0	5	0
55	DF	(Serbia) SRB	Milan Bogunović	21	0	16	0	1	0	4	0
61	FW	(Hungary) HUN	Máté Schmid	5	0	1	0	0	0	4	0
63	MF	(Hungary) HUN	Martin Iványi	4	0	1	0	0	0	3	0
85	DF	(Hungary) HUN	Csaba Csizmadia	20	2	17	2	0	0	3	0
89	FW	(Serbia) SRB	Saša Popin	19	3	16	2	1	0	2	1
97	MF	(Hungary) HUN	Bálint Böröczky	7	0	3	0	0	0	4	0
Youth players:
22	GK	(Hungary) HUN	Tamás Markek	1	-2	0	0	1	-2	0	0
23	GK	(Hungary) HUN	Gábor Horváth	4	-6	0	0	0	0	4	-6
30	DF	(Hungary) HUN	Patrik Badics	1	0	0	0	0	0	1	0
52	FW	(Hungary) HUN	Márk Ihász	1	0	0	0	0	0	1	0
61	DF	(Hungary) HUN	Ádám Palkovics	1	0	0	0	0	0	1	0
63	MF	(Hungary) HUN	Gábor Stenczel	1	0	0	0	0	0	1	0
98	FW	(Hungary) HUN	Bence Erdősi	2	0	0	0	0	0	2	0
Players no longer at the club:

=== Top scorers ===
Includes all competitive matches. The list is sorted by shirt number when total goals are equal.

Last updated on 6 December 2014

Position	Nation	Number	Name	OTP Bank Liga	Hungarian Cup	League Cup	Total
1	(Serbia)	89	Saša Popin	2	0	1	3
2	(Hungary)	85	Csaba Csizmadia	2	0	0	2
3	(Sweden)	28	Kristian Benkő	0	0	2	2
4	(Slovakia)	19	Marián Sluka	1	0	0	1
5	(Hungary)	8	Tamás Nagy	1	0	0	1
6	(Latvia)	11	Vadims Žuļevs	1	0	0	1
7	(Romania)	24	Andrei Coroian	1	0	0	1
8	(Hungary)	20	Krisztián Kenesei	0	0	1	1
/	/	/	Own Goals	0	0	1	1
			TOTALS	8	0	5	13

=== Disciplinary record ===
Includes all competitive matches. Players with 1 card or more included only.

Last updated on 6 December 2014

Position	Nation	Number	Name	OTP Bank Liga		Hungarian Cup		League Cup		Total (Hu Total)	
Position	Nation	Number	Name	Booked	Sent off (straight red)	Booked	Sent off (straight red)	Booked	Sent off (straight red)	Booked	Sent off (straight red)
DF	(Hungary)	4	Gábor Tóth	3	0	0	0	0	1	3 (3)	1 (0)
DF	(Hungary)	5	Bence Jagodics	3	0	0	0	1	0	4 (3)	0 (0)
FW	(Hungary)	7	Milán Faggyas	0	0	0	0	1	0	1 (0)	0 (0)
DF	(Hungary)	8	Tamás Nagy	5	0	1	0	1	0	7 (5)	0 (0)
FW	(Hungary)	9	Róbert Waltner	0	1	0	0	1	0	1 (0)	1 (1)
DF	(Brazil)	10	Bernardo Frizoni	4	0	1	0	0	0	5 (4)	0 (0)
MF	(Latvia)	11	Vadims Žuļevs	4	0	0	0	0	1	4 (4)	1 (0)
MF	(Hungary)	13	Tamás Csilus	4	0	1	0	1	0	6 (4)	0 (0)
MF	(Slovakia)	19	Marián Sluka	6	0	1	0	0	0	7 (6)	0 (0)
FW	(Hungary)	20	Krisztián Kenesei	2	0	0	0	0	0	2 (2)	0 (0)
MF	(Romania)	24	Andrei Coroian	1	0	0	0	1	0	2 (1)	0 (0)
DF	(Hungary)	25	Szabolcs Gál	0	0	0	0	1	0	1 (0)	0 (0)
GK	(Hungary)	27	Lajos Szűcs	1	0	0	0	0	0	1 (1)	0 (0)
MF	(Hungary)	31	Botond Király	0	0	0	0	2	0	2 (0)	0 (0)
DF	(Serbia)	55	Milan Bogunović	2	0	0	0	0	0	2 (2)	0 (0)
DF	(Hungary)	85	Csaba Csizmadia	1	0	0	0	0	0	1 (1)	0 (0)
FW	(Serbia)	89	Saša Popin	4	0	0	0	0	0	4 (4)	0 (0)
MF	(Hungary)	97	Bálint Böröczky	0	0	0	0	1	0	1 (0)	0 (0)
			TOTALS	40	1	4	0	10	2	54 (40)	3 (1)

=== Overall ===
Games played	24 (17 OTP Bank Liga, 1 Hungarian Cup and 6 Hungarian League Cup)
Games won	5 (3 OTP Bank Liga, 0 Hungarian Cup and 2 Hungarian League Cup)
Games drawn	6 (5 OTP Bank Liga, 0 Hungarian Cup and 1 Hungarian League Cup)
Games lost	13 (9 OTP Bank Liga, 1 Hungarian Cup and 3 Hungarian League Cup)
Goals scored	13
Goals conceded	38
Goal difference	-25
Yellow cards	54
Red cards	3
Worst discipline	(Hungary) Tamás Nagy (7 (yellow card) , 0 (red card) )
Worst discipline	(Slovakia) Marián Sluka (7 (yellow card) , 0 (red card) )
Best result	2–0 (H) v Siófok - Ligakupa - 07-10-2014
Worst result	0–5 (A) v Videoton - OTP Bank Liga - 29-11-2014
Most appearances	(Brazil) Bernardo Frizoni (21 appearances)
Most appearances	(Serbia) Milan Bogunović (21 appearances)
Top scorer	(Serbia) Saša Popin (3 goals)
Points	21/72 (30.44%)

Last updated: 6 December 2014

== Nemzeti Bajnokság I ==
=== Matches ===
26 July 2014 1	Videoton	3 – 0	Pápa	Székesfehérvár, Fejér County
18:30 CEST	Juhász 28', 63'; Nikolić 68' (pen.)	Report		Stadium: Stadion Sóstói; Attendance: 2,290; Referee: (Hungary) István Vad

3 August 2014 2	Pápa	1 – 0	Ferencváros	Pápa, Veszprém County
16:30 CEST	Popin 62'	Report		Stadium: Stadion Várkerti; Attendance: 3,500; Referee: (Hungary) Mihály Fábián

9 August 2014 3	Pápa	3 – 2	Kecskemét	Pápa, Veszprém County
18:30 CEST	Sluka 20'; Csizmadia 41'; Popin 43'	Report	Novák 7'; Pavićević 30'	Stadium: Stadion Várkerti; Attendance: 850; Referee: (Hungary) Zsolt Szabó

16 August 2014 4	Dunaújváros	1 – 1	Pápa	Székesfehérvár, Fejér County
18:30 CEST	Orosz 33'	Report	Nagy 37'	Stadium: Sóstói Stadion; Attendance: 443; Referee: (Hungary) Mihály Fábián

23 August 2014 5	Pápa	0 – 0	Győr	Pápa, Veszprém County
20:30 CEST		Report		Stadium: Stadion Várkerti; Attendance: 960; Referee: (Hungary) József Erdős

30 August 2014 6	Nyíregyháza	3 – 0	Pápa	Nyíregyháza, Szabolcs-Szatmár-Bereg County
18:30 CEST	Abdouraman 9'; Bajzát 12'; Pekár 90+3'	Report		Stadium: Sóstói Stadion; Attendance: 2,097; Referee: (Hungary) Zoltán Iványi

12 September 2014 7	Pápa	0 – 1	MTK	Pápa, Veszprém County
19:00 CEST		Report	Vass 45'	Stadium: Stadion Várkerti; Attendance: 754; Referee: (Hungary) István Vad

20 September 2014 8	Puskás	3 – 0	Pápa	Felcsút, Fejér County
20:30 CEST	Szakály 7'; Tischler 42'; Sallai 88'	Report		Stadium: Pancho Arena; Attendance: 500; Referee: (Hungary) József Erdős

27 September 2014 9	Pápa	0 – 0	Újpest	Pápa, Veszprém County
20:30 CEST		Report		Stadium: Stadion Várkerti; Attendance: 960; Referee: (Hungary) Ádám Németh

5 October 2014 10	Haladás	2 – 0	Pápa	Szombathely, Vas County
18:30 CEST	Rocchi 31'; Gyurján 84'	Report		Stadium: Rohonci Street Stadium; Attendance: 2,240; Referee: (Hungary) Viktor Kassai

18 October 2014 11	Pápa	0 – 0	Diósgyőr	Pápa, Veszprém County
14:00 CEST		Report		Stadium: Perutz Stadion; Attendance: 955; Referee: (Hungary) István Vad

25 October 2014 12	Pécs	1 – 2	Pápa	Pécs, Baranya County
18:00 CEST	Márkvárt 35'	Report	Žuļevs 47'; Coroian 90'	Stadium: Stadion PMFC; Attendance: 400; Referee: (Hungary) Zoltán Iványi

1 November 2014 13	Pápa	0 – 2	Debrecen	Pápa, Veszprém County
18:00 CET		Report	Brković 57'; Lázár 84'	Stadium: Perutz Stadion; Attendance: 1,000; Referee: (Hungary) Sándor Andó-Szabó

8 November 2014 14	Paks	3 – 0	Pápa	Paks, Tolna County
16:00 CET	Báló 45'; Haraszti 68'; Bor 90+1'	Report		Stadium: Stadion PSE; Attendance: 1,053; Referee: (Hungary) Ádám Németh

22 November 2014 15	Pápa	1 – 1	Honvéd	Pápa, Veszprém County
20:00 CET	Csizmadia 90+4' (pen.)	Report	Baráth 56'	Stadium: Perutz Stadion; Attendance: 480; Referee: (Hungary) Csaba Pintér

29 November 2014 16	Pápa	0 – 5	Videoton	Pápa, Veszprém County
16:00 CET		Report	Nikolić 9', 14'; Gyurcsó 44'; Stopira 59'; Feczesin 69'	Stadium: Perutz Stadion; Attendance: 400; Referee: (Hungary) Sándor Andó-Szabó

5 December 2014 17	Ferencváros	2 – 0	Pápa	Budapest, Pest County
19:00 CET	Kukuruzović 28'; Gera 36' (pen.)	Report		Stadium: Groupama Arena; Attendance: 3,465; Referee: (Hungary) Zsolt Szabó

=== Classification ===
Pos	Team	Pld	W	D	L	GF	GA	GD	Pts	Qualification or relegation
12	Nyíregyháza (R)	30	8	6	16	33	49	−16	30	Relegation to Nemzeti Bajnokság III (Note: Kecskemét, Nyíregyháza and Pécs won't be members of 2015–16 Nemzeti Bajnokság I due to licence problems)
13	Honvéd	30	6	10	14	26	36	−10	28	
14	Haladás	30	7	4	19	26	53	−27	25	
15	Dunaújváros (Note: Dunaújváros deducted 1 point) (R)	30	5	8	17	26	49	−23	22	Relegation to Nemzeti Bajnokság II
16	Pápa (R)	30	4	7	19	14	57	−43	19	Dissolved - Pápai PFC in the Veszprém County Football League One as successor

Source: mlsz.hu (in Hungarian)
Rules for classification: 1st points; 2nd overall wins; 3rd goal difference; 4th head-to-head points; 5th head-to-head goal difference; 6th head-to-head away goals scored; 7th fair-play points; 8th drawing of lots
(R) Relegated

=== Results summary ===
Overall								Home						Away					
Pld	W	D	L	GF	GA	GD	Pts	W	D	L	GF	GA	GD	W	D	L	GF	GA	GD
16	3	4	9	8	29	−21	13	2	3	3	5	11	−6	1	1	6	3	18	−15

Last updated: 6 December 2014.
Source: NB1

=== Results by round ===
Round	1	2	3	4	5	6	7	8	9	10	11	12	13	14	15	16	17	18	19	20	21	22	23	24	25	26	27	28	29	30
Ground	A	H	H	A	H	A	H	A	H	A	H	A	H	A	H	H	A													
Result	L	W	W	D	D	L	L	L	D	L	D	W	L	L	D	L	L													
Position	14	10	6	7	7	8	11	11	12	13	13	11	11	11	12	12	12													

Updated to match(es) played on 6 December 2014. Source: Matches
A = Away; H = Home; W = Win; D = Draw; L = Loss

== Hungarian Cup ==
13 August 2014 Round 1	Soroksár	2 – 0	Pápa	Budapest, Pest County
17:00 CEST	Lovrencsics 3'; Tóbiás 90'	Report		Stadium: Stadion Haraszti Street; Referee: (Hungary) Gergely Kovács

== League Cup ==
=== Group stage ===
2 September 2014 1	Pápa	0 – 2	Haladás	Pápa, Veszprém County
17:00 CEST		Report	Gaál 11'; Városi 20'	Stadium: Stadion Várkerti; Attendance: 200; Referee: (Hungary) Gergely Szőts

16 September 2014 2	Sopron	2 – 0	Pápa	Sopron, Győr-Moson-Sopron County
14:00 CEST	Horváth 32'; Szabó 90+3'	Report		Stadium: Stadion Városi; Attendance: 200; Referee: (Hungary) Gergely Kovács

7 October 2014 3	Pápa	2 – 0	Siófok	Pápa, Veszprém County
16:00 CEST	Benkő 53'; Popin 81'	Report		Stadium: Stadion Várkerti; Attendance: 100; Referee: (Hungary) Balázs Berke

14 October 2014 4	Siófok	1 – 1	Pápa	Siófok, Somogy County
16:00 CEST	Eisenberger 34'	Report	Benkő 55'	Stadium: Révész Street Stadium; Attendance: 50; Referee: (Hungary) Gábor Oláh

11 November 2014 5	Pápa	1 – 0	Sopron	Pápa, Veszprém County
16:00 CET	Kenesei 83'	Report		Stadium: Stadion Várkerti; Attendance: 50; Referee: (Hungary) Gábor Barna

18 November 2014 6	Haladás	2 – 1	Pápa	Szombathely, Vas County
14:30 CEST	Nagy 40'; Zamostny 48'	Report	Hirschler 35'	Stadium: Rohonci Street Stadium; Attendance: 100; Referee: (Hungary) Attila Molnár

Pos	Team	Pld	W	D	L	GF	GA	GD	Pts	Qualification	HAL	SOP	PÁP	SIÓ
1	Haladás	6	4	1	1	12	4	+8	13	Advance to knockout phase	—	1–1	2–1	2–0
2	Sopron	6	3	1	2	7	5	+2	10	Advance to knockout phase	2–1	—	2–0	0–2
3	Pápa	6	2	1	3	5	7	−2	7		0–2	1–0	—	2–0
4	Siófok	6	1	1	4	3	11	−8	4		0–4	0–2	1–1	—

Source: Soccerway
