= Zvārde forest =

Nature park in Latvia

Zvārde Forest Nature Park
- IUCN category II (national park)
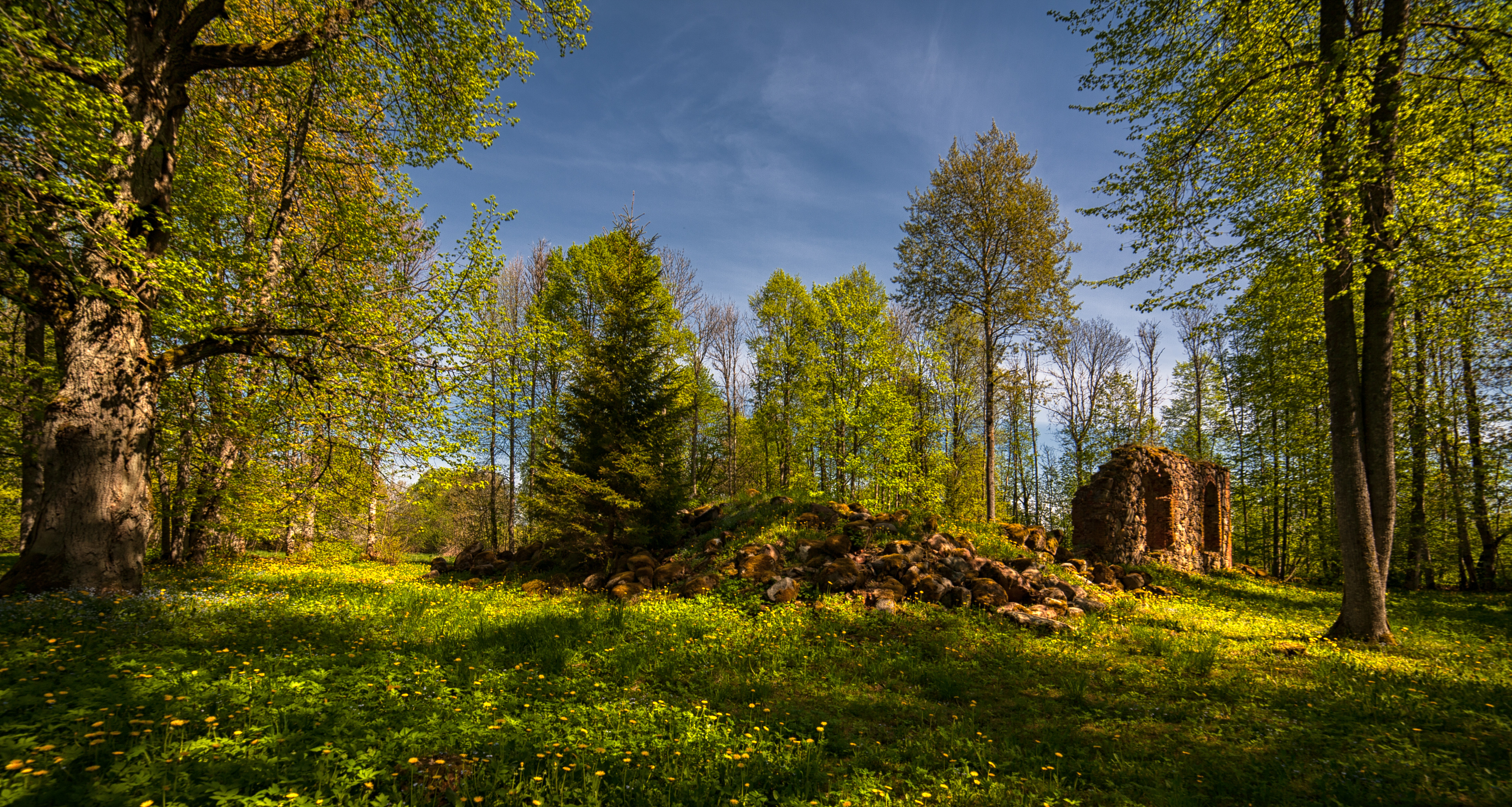
- Ruins of Lutheran church in Zvārde forest.

- Location within Latvia
- Location: Latvia, Courland, Saldus Municipality
- Nearest city: Jaunauce
- Coordinates: 56°30′1″N 22°36′23″E
- Area: 81.74 km^{2} (31.56 sq mi)
- Established: 2004

Zvārde forest (Latvian: Zvārdes meži) is nature park in Latvia Saldus Municipality. Zvārde forest is located in the eastern part of Saldus Hills occupying most of the land formerly used as bombing range by Soviet Army. Administratively belongs to Jaunauce Parish, Ruba Parish and Zvārde Parish. It is bordered on the northeast by the Zvārdes nature reserve. The protected area was established in 2004 to ensure the protection of existing natural values at the same time as promoting the sustainable development of the area. It is Natura 2000 site.

== Flora ==
Some species of plants of the European Habitats Directive have been identified in the area. The natural park is home to a varied set of landscapes: swamp with European alder (Alnus glutinosa), boreal forests, Sarmatic mixed forests.

== Fauna ==
The area is of international importance for the protection of birds. In total 24 species, that are under protection by the European Union Birds Directive have been identified within the nature park, such as lesser spotted eagle (Clanga pomarina). Due to the unique history of the territory - almost complete exclusion from economic activities during the Soviet Army bombing range, a peculiar complex of habitats has formed in it. The smooth operation of Eurasian beavers (Castor fiber) is one of the main reasons for the significant diversity of habitats and species currently characteristic of the park.
