= Ciecere River =

River in Courland, Latvia

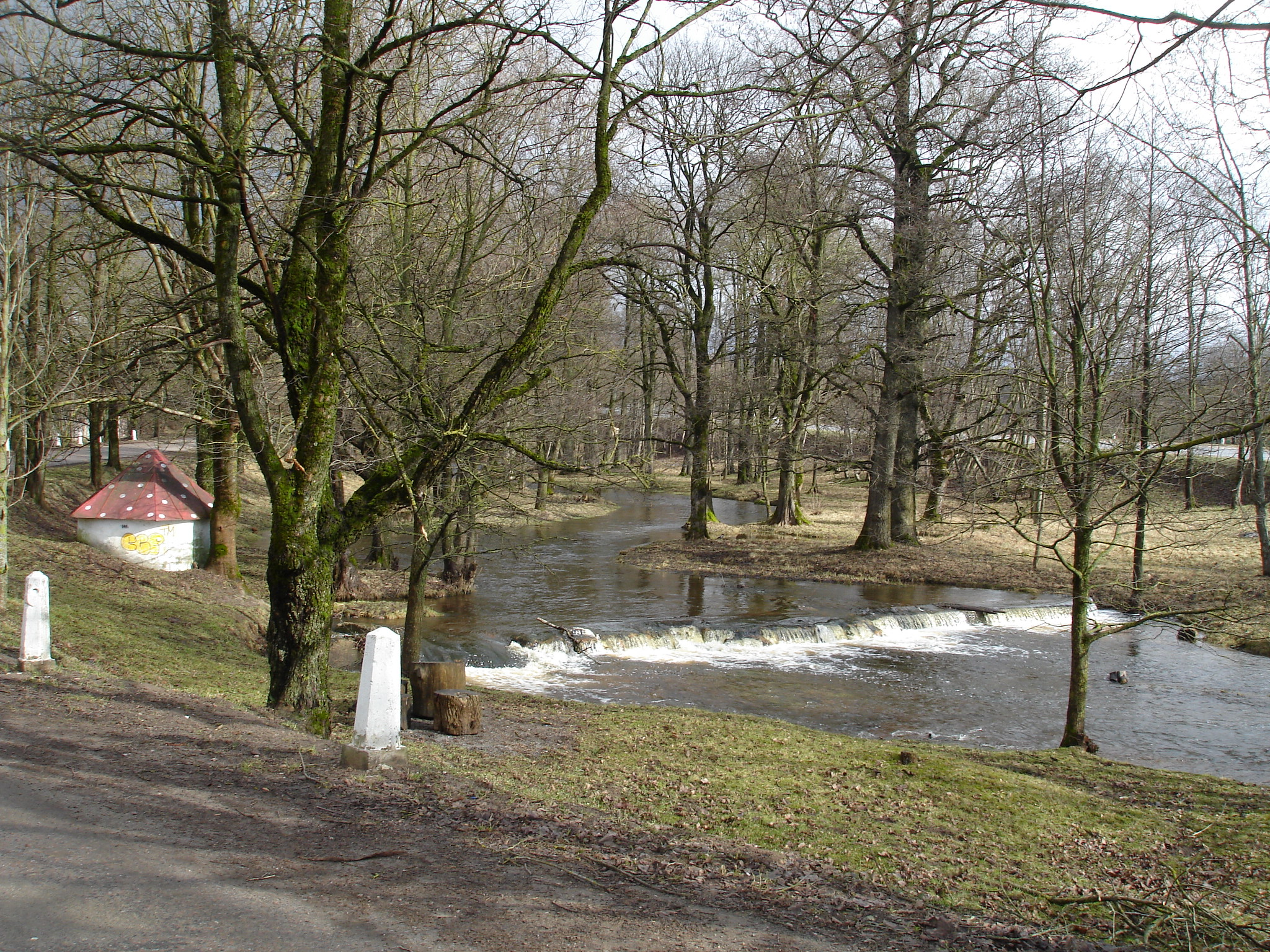
- The Ciecere in Saldus

Location
- Country: Latvia
- Municipality: Saldus Municipality

Physical characteristics
- Source
  - location: Lake Ciecere
  - coordinates: 56°39′47″N 22°33′9″E
- Mouth
  - location: Venta River
  - coordinates: 56°40′43″N 22°2′22″E
- Length: 51 km (32 mi)
- Width
  - average: 10 m (33 ft)
- Depth
  - average: 0.45 m (1 ft 6 in)

The Ciecere River is a right-bank tributary of the Venta River, flowing through the Saldus and Kuldīga districts. The basin is mostly located in the East Curonian Spit, where the 50 m-deep Lake Ciecere has formed in subglacial deposits, from which the Ciecere flows. The Mazupe River, a tributary of Lake Ciecere, is sometimes considered to be the origin of the Ciecere, which flows westward.

== Tributaries ==
The largest tributaries on the right bank are the Vēršāda, the Dīcmaņu brook, and the Krimelde, and on the left bank - the Bukupe and the Paksīte. The Ciecere has 48 other tributaries that are shorter than 10 km in length (total length 71 km). There are 25 lakes in the Ciecere basin with a total area of 4.05 km².

== Features and area ==
The upper and middle sections of the basin are empty fields and fields with woodlands, while the lower part has large, forested areas. The river has moderately sloping declines, often overgrown with scrub, and the floodplain is also partly covered with scrub. There are bedrock outcrops of dolomite located in sporadic sections on the banks. The lower reaches at the mouth of the Paksīte River the Pavāru outcrop is a nature conservation site. The Ciecerė River is home to rudd, perch, pike, bream, crayfish, trout, alewife, whitefish, freshwater bullhead, grunter, chub, staghorn sculpin, dace and spurdog.

=== Fossil finds ===
The first Latvian tetrapod discoveries of the Upper Devonian period were found in the Ciecere. Specifically, cranial elements of Ventastega curonica.

== Human development ==
The river is crossed by the A9 motorway. The largest settlements on the banks are Saldus, Ciecere, Sātiņi, Mežvidi, and Kušaiņi.

Three hydroelectric power plants have been built on the Ciecere: the Ciecere Mill HPP, the Dzirnavnieki HPP and the Pakuli HPP. Three artificial waterfalls have been created on the Ciecere within the Saldus city limits, but only two of them are currently visible after the construction of the Dzirnavnieki HPP, which blocked the third.
