= Lašupe Station =

Railway station in Latvia

General information
- Location: Lašupe; Lutriņi Parish, Saldus Municipality; Latvia
- Coordinates: 56°42′19.04″N 22°17′12.36″E
Location
- Location within Latvia

Lašupe Station is a defunct railway station located in Lašupe, Lutrini Parish, Latvia. It was a stop along the Jelgava – Liepāja Railway.

History the station was part of the railway infrastructure development in Latvia during the beginning of the 20th century. It was once a transit point for passengers, it became a regional trail priorities changed. Based on the 2011 Railway Infrastructure Overview, the station is no longer in use.
