= Blīdene Station =

Railway station in Latvia

General information
- Location: Pilsblīdene; Blīdene parish, Saldus Municipality; Latvia
- Coordinates: 56°42′1.40″N 22°41′20.68″E
- Line: Jelgava–Liepāja Railway
- Tracks: 1

History
- Opened: 1927
- Closed: Unused since 2001
Location

Blīdene Station is a defunct railway station on Latvia's Jelgava – Liepāja Railway.
