= Lutriņi Station =

Railway station in Latvia

General information
- Location: Lutriņi Parish, Saldus Municipality; Latvia
- Coordinates: 56°41′51.65″N 22°20′59.86″E
Location
- Location within Latvia

Lutriņi Station is a defunct railway station on the Jelgava – Liepāja Railway.
