= Jaunauce Manor =

Manor in Latvia

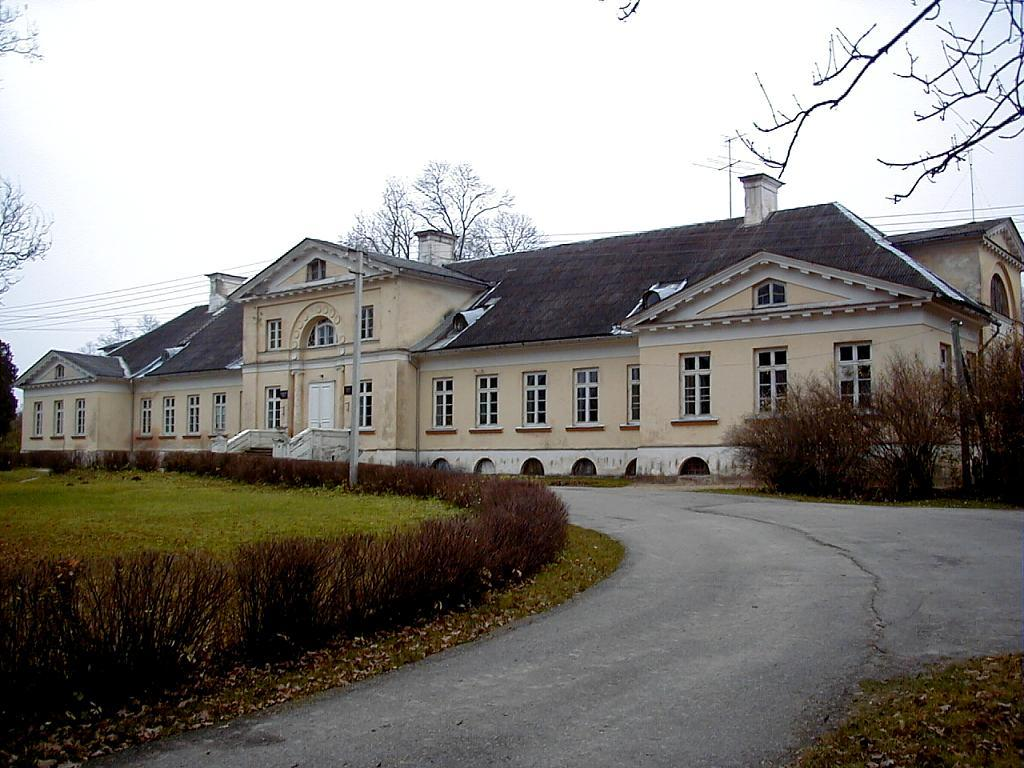

- Location within Latvia

General information
- Architectural style: Empire style
- Location: Saldus municipality, Latvia
- Coordinates: 56°26′39.5″N 22°41′23.7″E
- Completed: Beginning of 19th century
- Client: Count Karl Johann Friedrich von Medem

Jaunauce Manor (Latvian: Jaunauces muižas pils; German: Schloss Neu-Autz) is a manor house in Jaunauce parish in Saldus municipality in the historical region of Semigallia, in western Latvia.

== History ==
The name Aucis, or Auce, was already known in pre-Livonian times. During Livonian Order period, Juan Auce has been called Mazauce for about 150 years. In 1518, the master of the Livonian Order Wolter von Plettenberg dedicated this area to Johann Koskull. Between 1575 and 1671 Jaunauce belonged to the Dukes of the House of Kettler. Duke Wilhelm Kettler founded a church in 1612 and built a stone church. Duke Jacob Kettler restored the name of Jaunauce (German: Neu-Autz), and his large-scale economic activities did not fail for Jaunauce as well — a glass kiln and pottery were in operation. In 1804, the estate of Jaunauce was purchased by Count Karl Johann Friedrich von Medem (1762–1827), one of the members of the land of the most influential landlords of the Duchy of Courland, the son of the Count Johann Friedrich (Ivan Fedorovich) Graf von Medem. Karl's sister Dorothea von Medem - wife of Peter von Biron the last Duke of Courland. With the passing of the Jaunauce Manor into the ownership of the Medem family, the manor flourished. Extensive outbuildings are under way, under the leadership of Baron Ferdinand Ropp, who had married the Count's daughter, Caroline. On June 12, 1815, Count Karl Medem and his wife donated 1333 rubles to their daughter Karolina to build a new mansion. Baron Ferdinand Ropp with his brother Theodore from 1801 to 1805. He traveled to Western Europe for the period 1800–1806, participated in an expedition to the summit of Mont Blanc, visited artists' workshops, and, at that time, to the young sculptor Bertel Thorvaldsen, commissioned eight marble busts in Rome in the luxurious dome of the newly built Jaunauce manor house. After the death of Count Medem in 1827, according to the will, the estate was inherited by a daughter, Caroline, and her husband, Ferdinand. The Baron Ropp family had been holding the Jaunauce Manor for three generations for almost 100 years.

In 1903, the architect Max Alex von der Ropp renovated the interior of the manor house. The last owner of the manor was Karl von Ropp, the son of Theodore, who was expropriated after the land reform in 1920s.

From 1922 to 1926, the Ministry of Agriculture leased the Jaunauce Manor Center with the manor house to the Latvian Youth Union. The goal was to set up a sanatorium for at least 20 needy youth. In 1926 the lease was terminated due to poor management. The buildings were assigned to Jaunauce Parish, the land was divided into several new farms.

1926 - 1930. On the premises of the manor house there are a pharmacy, doctor and midwife.

1930 - 2009. School moved to the manor house. No house remodeling is done to accommodate the school. Jaunauce School joins the Latvian Association of Castles and Manors in 2000 and becomes a tourist destination during the summer months. The exploration and restoration works of the manor house are started - the roofing of the tile is renewed, the restoration of the domed hall is started. The park reconstruction project has been developed and started In 2009 Saldus Municipality closes the school. The maintenance of the manor house is covered by the joint administration of Jaunauce and Rubas parishes. Thanks to the activities of the Society "We - Jaunauce", cultural and lifelong learning events take place in the manor house, as well as the restoration of the manor house. Funding association attracts with the project method. The manor house is a cultural tourist attraction. Jaunace Manor is one of the best preserved examples of late classicism architecture in Latvia.

== See also ==
- List of palaces and manor houses in Latvia
