= Brocēni Municipality =

Municipality of Latvia

Coordinates: 56.7333°N 22.6500°E

Brocēni Municipality Brocēnu novads
- Former municipality
- Flag Coat of arms

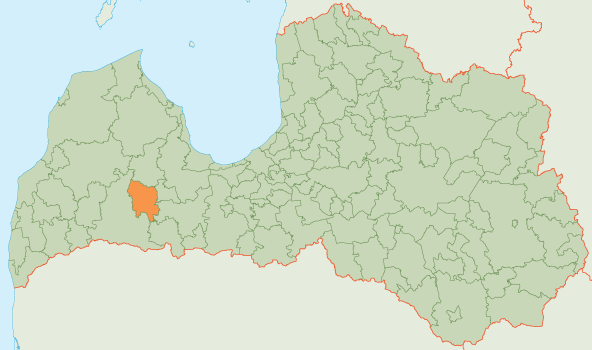
- Country: Latvia
- Formed: 2001
- Dissolved: 2021
- Centre: Brocēni

Government
  - Chairman: Ārijs Sproģis (LZP)

Area
  - Total: 496.55 km^{2} (191.72 sq mi)
  - Land: 481.36 km^{2} (185.85 sq mi)
  - Water: 15.19 km^{2} (5.86 sq mi)

Population (2021)
  - Total: 5,672
  - Density: 11.78/km^{2} (30.52/sq mi)
- Website: www.broceni.lv

Brocēni Municipality (Latvian: Brocēnu novads) was a municipality in Courland, Latvia. As of 2020, the population was 5,633.

== History ==
The municipality was formed in 2001 by merging Blīdene parish, Remte parish and Brocēni town with its countryside territory, the administrative centre being Brocēni. In 2009 the municipality absorbed Gaiķi parish as well. In 2010 Ciecere parish was created from the countryside territory of Brocēni town. On 1 July 2021, the municipality was merged with Saldus Municipality. The name of the new municipality is Saldus Municipality.

== Geography ==
The district is located to the east of the city Saldus. Limestone is mined at Lake Cieceres and at Brocēni. The railway line from Riga to Liepāja runs through the district in a west-east direction.

== See also ==
- Administrative divisions of Latvia
