= Airīte Station =

Railway station in Latvia

Airīte
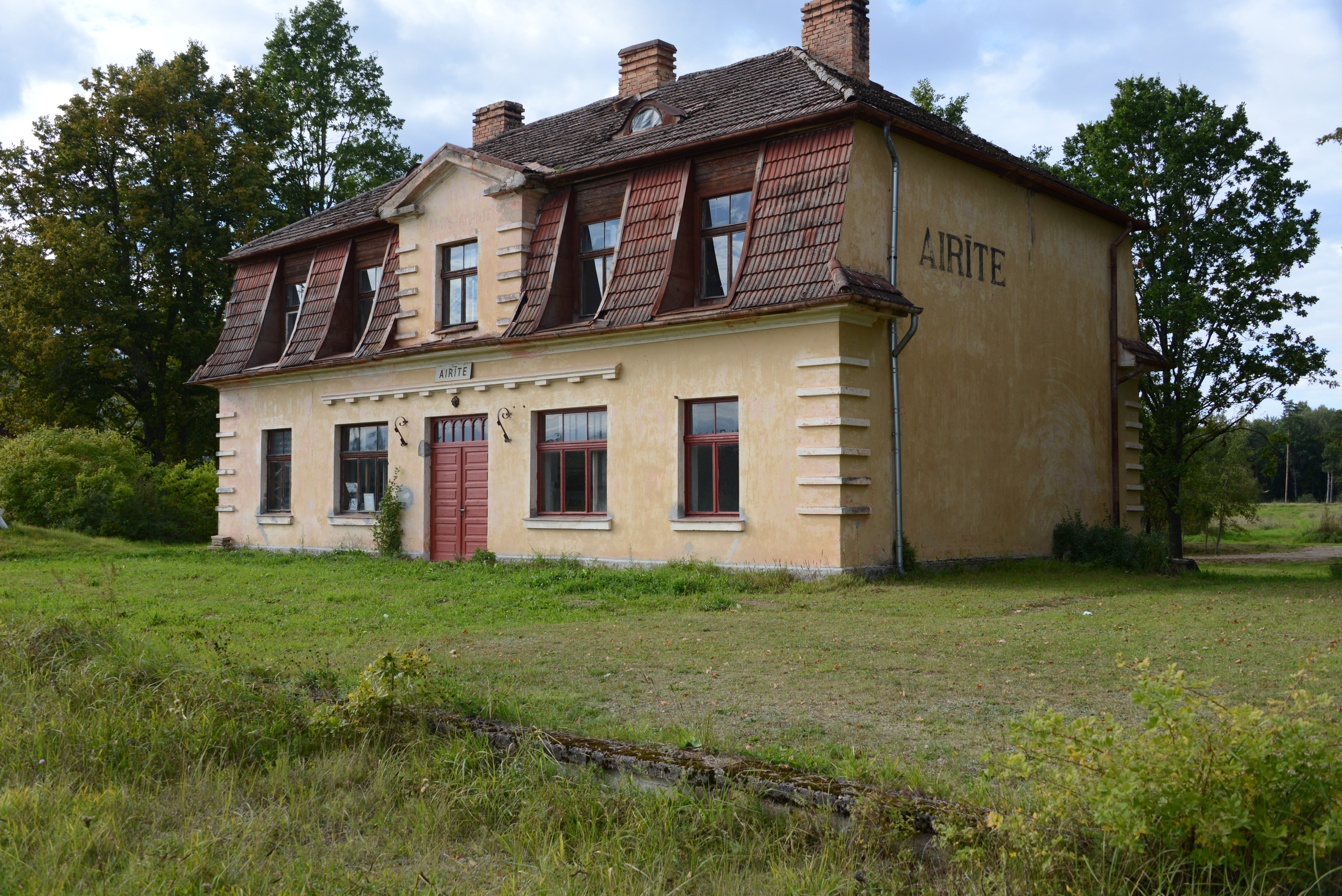
- Station Building

General information
- Location: Airīte stacija Zirņi Parish, Saldus Municipality; Latvia
- Coordinates: 56°42′19.71″N 22°10′18.93″E
Location
- Location within Latvia

Airīte Station is a railway station on the Jelgava – Liepāja Railway.
