= Vadakste Manor =

Manor house in Latvia

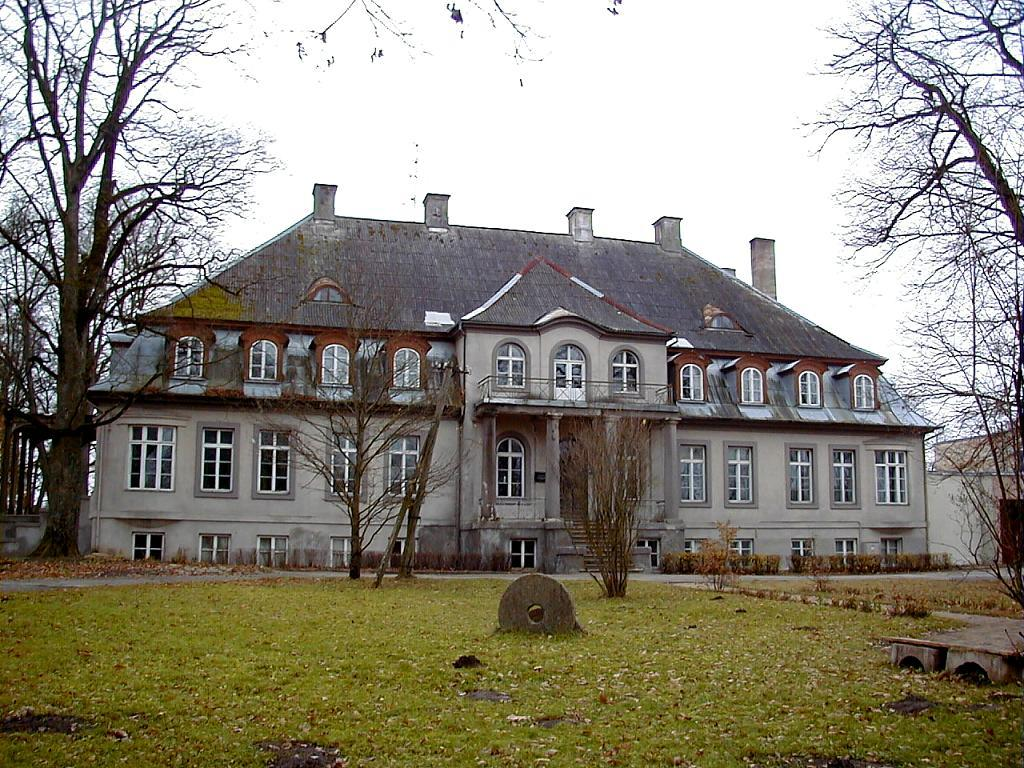

- Location within Latvia

General information
- Architectural style: Neo-Classicism
- Location: Vadakste parish, Latvia
- Coordinates: 56°22′22.7″N 22°44′53.7″E
- Construction started: 1911
- Completed: 1914
- Client: von Bistram family

Design and construction
- Architect: L. Reinir

Vadakste Manor (Latvian: Vadakstes muiža, German: Waddaxt) is a manor house in Vadakste Parish, Saldus Municipality in the Semigallia region of Latvia.

== History ==
Architectural ensemble of the manor complex is situated on the right bank of the Vadakste River. In ancient times it was location of the Semigallian mound and the last Semigallian settlement before tribe moved to modern days Lithuania.

Vadakste Manor was a property of von Bistram noble family until the early 20th century. The Old manor house was built in the 2nd half of the 18th century. This one storey mansonry house had it walls planked later. Upon contraction of a new Manor house it was used as a servants' house. Preserved architectural elements also include original luxurious, classicism style, entrance doors and window mountings. Modern household buildings were erected later, in the early 19th century.

It was built between 1911 and 1914 in Neo-Classical style according to the project of architect L. Reinir. Interiors of the building has some Art Nouveau influences. The Oval Hall niches hide decorative ceramic tile stoves with columns. Main hall with an Art Nouveau style hearth and fireplace has a spacious wooden staircase leading to the second floor.

This New manor house was built on occasion of wedding of baron Paul von Bistram with Eleonora von Behr. Since 1923 the building has housed the Vadakste Primary School. On the second floor of Vadakste manor there is a manor history repository of the antiquities of the inhabitants of the parish, the attributes of the Soviet period, and the other material evidence of the history of the parish.

== Manor park ==
Manor complex is surrounded with late 18th - 19th century park. It was modernized in the early 20th century by baron von Bistram. Many rare species of trees and plants still grow here.

== See also ==
- List of palaces and manor houses in Latvia
