= Eastern Kurzeme Upland =

Geographic region in Courland and Semigallia

East Curonian Spit Austrumkursas augstiene
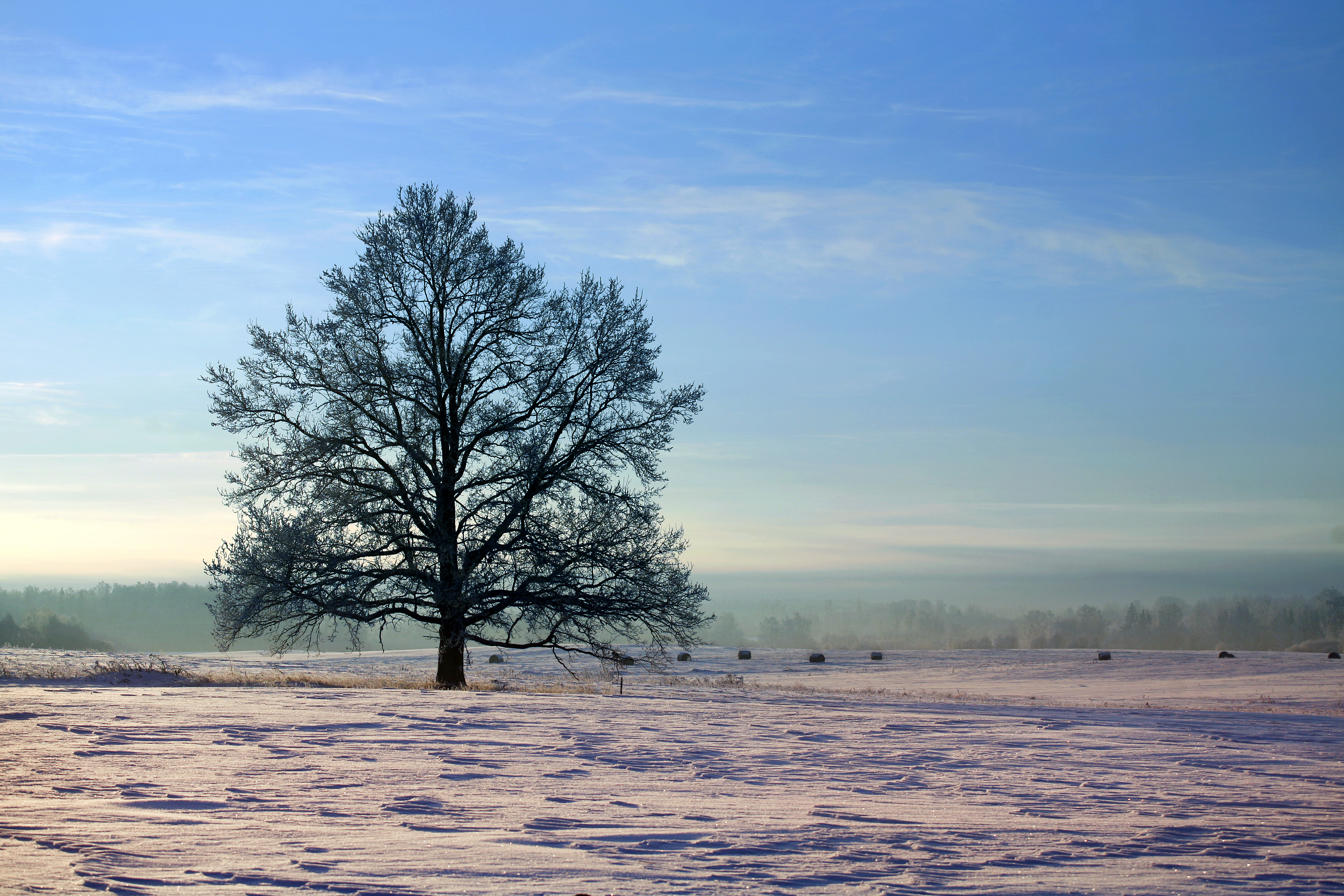
- Saldus hill landscape near Lielciecere

- Approximate location of the highlands in Latvia
- Coordinates: 56°45′00″N 22°40′00″E
- Country: Latvia
- Region: Courland, Semigallia

Area
  - Total: 3,860 km^{2} (1,490 sq mi)

Dimensions
  - Length: 70 km (43 mi)
  - Width: 55 km (34 mi)
- Highest elevation: 153.4 m (503 ft)

The Eastern Kurzeme Upland (Latvian: Austrumkursas augstiene) is a region located in Courland and Zemgale. It is situated in the western part of Latvia between the Semigallia Plain in the west and the Kursa Lowlands in the east. The Abava Valley separates it from the North Kurzeme Upland to the north, and the Vadakste Plain adjoins it to the south.

== Composition ==
The East Curonian Upland consists of a broad bedrock uplift under a relatively thin cover of Quaternary rock. This highland differs from most highlands in Latvia by its weak relief articulation. It is divided into five natural areas: the Abava Valley, the Varme depression, the Saldus hills, the Spārne undulating plain and the Lielauce hills. In the western part, the upland gradually rises from the Pieventa Plain. The well-defined boundary follows the Sesava River in the south-eastern part, but south-east of Dobele, it coincides with the shore ramparts of the Baltic Ice Lake, continuing northwards where it merges with the Abava Valley. More corrugated hills with a greater variance in altitude are found only in the southern part of the highlands, around Lake Zebrus, and on the northern periphery of the highlands. In the north and north-west, the upland gently descends towards the Abava valley, reaching about 80 m above sea level in the Kandava-Sabile region. The highest point of the relief is Smiltiņu hill (153.4 m asl) near Zante.^{[lv]}

== Geology ==
In the northern and central part of the highlands, up to about Saldus, there are rocks dated to the Upper Devonian and Carboniferous periods, including limestone, under Quaternary sediments, Permian limestone and dolomite in the south, and Jurassic rocks in the south-east.

Bedrock is close to the surface in several parts of the region, including outcrops on the banks of Lake Ciecere, the Ciecere River, and the Imula River.

The bedrock surface at Zante is 122 m above sea level, but it decreases towards the edges of the highlands. The average thickness of the Quaternary cover is bigger on the slopes of the bedrock uplifts, reaching 50-60 m there.

== Reliefs ==
The altitude around the top of the highlands ranges from 80 to 150 meters. Most of the highlands are gently curved basic moraine plains with an average altitude of 100 m above sea level. In the western part of the highlands, south of Lutriņi, is Ķirmeskalns (138 m), which is elevated only slightly above the surrounding area.

The most extensive areas of moraine hills are in the south-east of the highlands, around Lake Zebrus, south-east of Kandava and west of Dobele.

Other relief types found within the highlands include: undulating plains of fluvioglacial sand (south of Sabile) and drumlins (between Salda and Kursīši and between Lutrini and Kabile).

== Climate ==
The geography and topography of the Highlands result in slight differences in climate. The prevailing westerly winds bring rainfall ranging from 600 to 700 millimeters per year on the western slope and 500 to 650 millimeters in other parts of the highlands. The average annual temperature in the highlands is around 5.4°C (41.7°F), with average lows in January reaching -3.7°C (25.3°F) and average highs of 17.3°C (63.1°F) in July, although the eastern sections of the highlands have slightly more extreme divergences in temperature. The growing season lasts 185-195 days, with about 140 frost-free days. Snow cover lasts 100-110 days in the central part of the highlands and 80-100 days on the western and northern slopes.

== Hydrography ==
Several rivers flow in shallow valleys on all sides of the spit, from the central part of the highlands, belonging mainly to the Venta basin. The northern and eastern slopes are drained by the Abava with its tributaries Viesāti, Imūla and Amula River. The annual thickness of the runoff layer is about 230 millimeters. The western slope is crossed by the Riežupe River, Ēda River, Ciecere River and Zaņa River, which drain in the central part of the uplands. There, the annual runoff layer thickness is higher, at about 250 millimeters. However, these rivers are not able to completely drain the slope, so the areas near Lutrini, around Gaiķi, south of the Ciecere and near Satini are swampy (shallow grass marshes have formed there).

== Flora ==
Turf carbonate soils have formed in small areas on carbonate-rich loams, calcareous loams, dolomite, and limestone. Most of these soils are now on moorland and are well cultivated, but where they have formed on skeletal limestone, they compose garsha-type forests.

The uplands contain many of the types of forests and grasslands typical in Latvia, with the exception of the Grina. Broad-leaved trees grow on carbonate-washed soils, as well as on podzolic gley and gleyed clay or loam soils on a base of marl or dolomite.

Grasses are widespread in relief depressions in the loamy, gley, and marshy soils of the turf, where there is a moisture bottleneck, and in river valleys. In the years following World War II, large areas of scrubland were established in the fallow and cleared forests in the southern part of the uplands (including around Zvārdi, Ķērķiņi, Kursīši, Blīdene, and Gaiķi).
