= Brocēni Station =

Railway station in Latvia

Brocēni
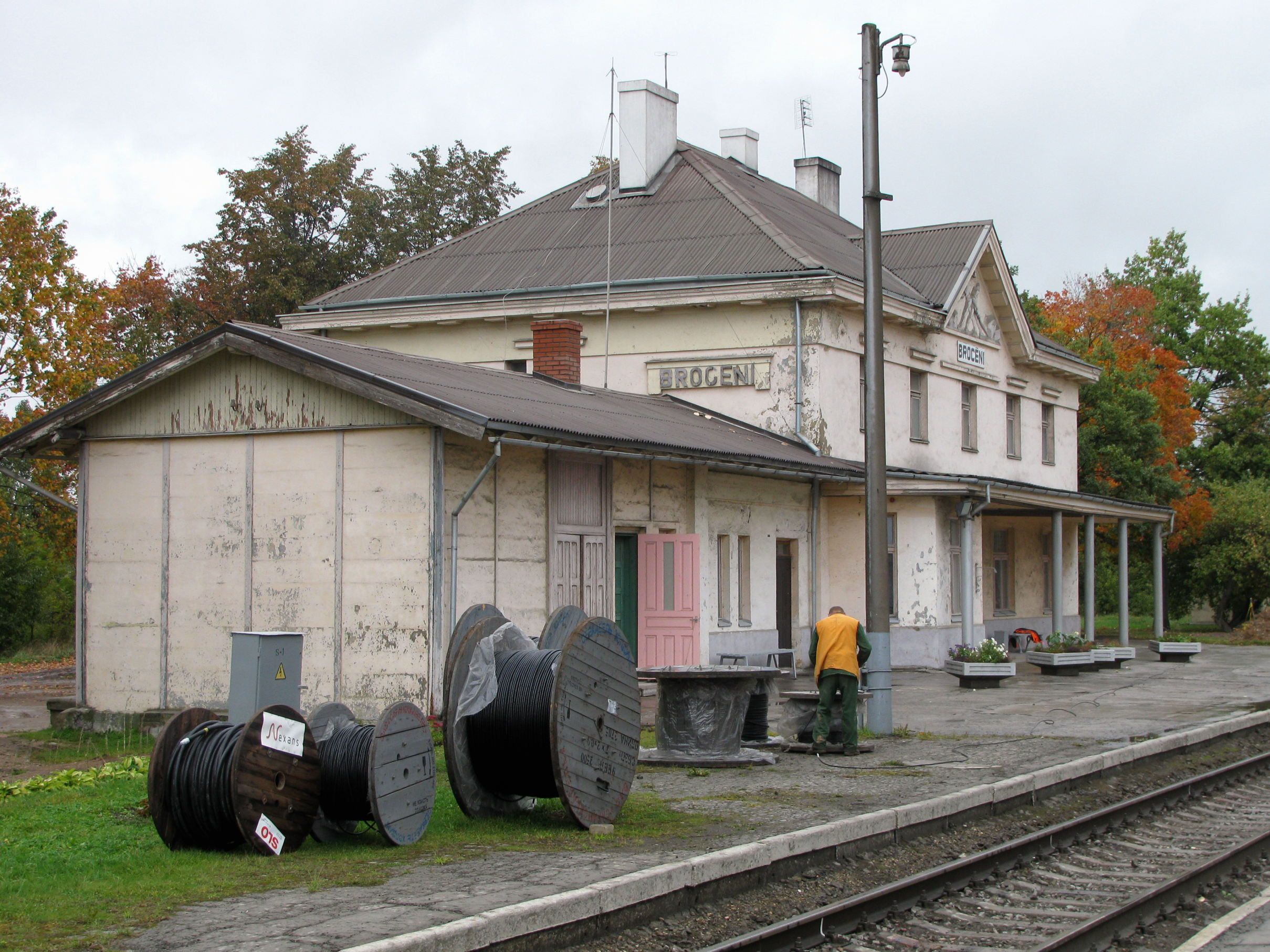
- Brocēni Station

General information
- Location: Brocēni, Saldus Municipality; Latvia
- Coordinates: 56°41′36.63″N 22°34′17.52″E
- Line: Jelgava–Liepāja
- Platforms: 2
- Tracks: 4

History
- Opened: 1927
Location

Brocēni Station is a railway station in Brocēni on the Jelgava – Liepāja Railway.
