= Jaunmuiža Manor =

Manor house in Latvia

- Courland, Latvia
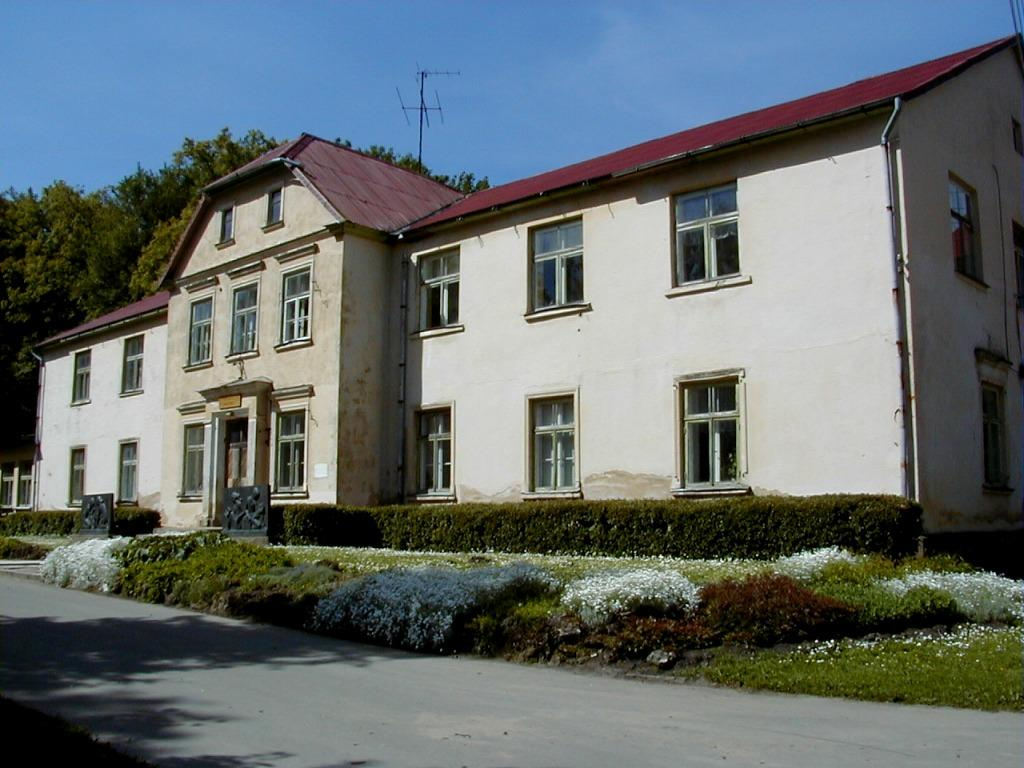

Site information
- Type: Manor

Location
- Coordinates: 56°49′45.4″N 22°24′06.8″E

Jaunmuiža Manor (Latvian: Jaunmuiža pils, German: Gut Neuhof), also called Jaunlutriņi Manor, is a manor house in Jaunlutriņi Parish, Saldus Municipality the historical region of Courland, in western Latvia. Originally built at the beginning of the 19th century, it currently houses the Jaunlutriņi primary school.

== History ==
In 1772 the second floor of the manor house was built. In front of the manor house there are sculptural carvings by sculptor Alvin Weinbach. Jaunmuiža granary, built in 1817, has also been preserved. The barn door, made of ruff-shaped boards and richly decorated with large nails, is recognized as an art monument. Other farm buildings have also been preserved. The building was renovated in 1973.

== Jaunlutriņi primary school ==
In the course of the Latvian agrarian reform of the 1920s the manor was nationalized. On December 17, 1923, the Jaunlutriņi primary school was moved to Jaunmuiža manor house. It has been operating in this location ever since.

== Vācietis Memorial Museum ==
Colonel Jukums Vācietis (1873-1938) was born in the former manor house. In 1973 the J.Vācietis Memorial Museum was opened in a freshly renovated building. In front of the museum is a sculptural image of J.Vācietis, made by the sculptor Leo Davidova-Medene.

== Manor park ==
Jaunmuiža park (2.2 ha) is located between the Jaunmuiža manor house and road V1429 (Jaunpils - Ošenieki). The park was established at the end of the 19th century by manor owner Prince Lieven. It is well maintained, with 24 plantings of alien trees and shrubs.

== See also ==
- List of palaces and manor houses in Latvia
