= Ciecere Parish =

Parish of Latvia

- parish of Latvia
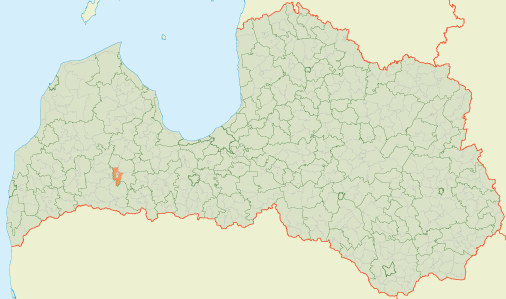
- 56°40′15″N 22°34′36″E
- Country: Latvia

Area
  - Total: 88.16 km^{2} (34.04 sq mi)
  - Land: 82.8 km^{2} (32.0 sq mi)
  - Water: 5.36 km^{2} (2.07 sq mi)

Population (1 January 2024)
  - Total: 880
  - Density: 10.0/km^{2} (26/sq mi)

Ciecere Parish (Latvian: Cieceres pagasts) is an administrative unit of Saldus Municipality, Latvia. It was created in 2010 from the countryside territory of Brocēni town. At the beginning of 2014, the population of the parish was 1028.

== History ==
Historically, the territory of Ciecere parish housed the Lemut Manor (Gut Lemsern), the Lielciecere Manor (Gut Groß-Zezern, Lielciecere), the Mazciecere Manor (Gut Klein-Zezern). In 1927, the area of Brocēni parish was 44.79 km², Ciecere parish - 65.23 km². In 1930, both parishes were merged and renamed "Brocēni Parish", but in 1931 it was renamed "Ciecere Parish". In 1935, Kuldīga district Ciecere parish had an area of 120 km² and a population of 2,028. In 1945, Brocēni village was established in the parish. Cieceres and Lake village council (Selsoviet), but the parish was liquidated in 1949. In 1950, Saldus district Brocēni was granted the status of urban-type settlement (from 1961 - city village) and a part of Brocēni village was added to it, creating Brocēni village territory . The liquidated village of Ciecere was added to it in 1956. In 1992, the Brocēni were granted city rights. In 1999, part of the rural territory (Kalnsētas) was included in the city of Saldus. In 2001, the city of Brocēni with a rural territory became part of the newly established Brocēni Municipality. In 2009, the rural territory of Brocēni was separated as a separate administrative unit and in 2010 renamed Ciecere Parish.

== Geography ==
Ciecere parish has several small rivers — Akmeņstrauts, Lemzere, Mazupe, Mežupīte, Nabagupe and lakes — Baltezers, Lake Brocēni, Lake Cieceres, Luknis, Mellezeris.

== Towns, villages and settlements of Ciecere parish ==
- Brocēnmuiža
- Emburga
- Lielciecere
- Oškalni
