= Remte =

Village in Latvia

- Village
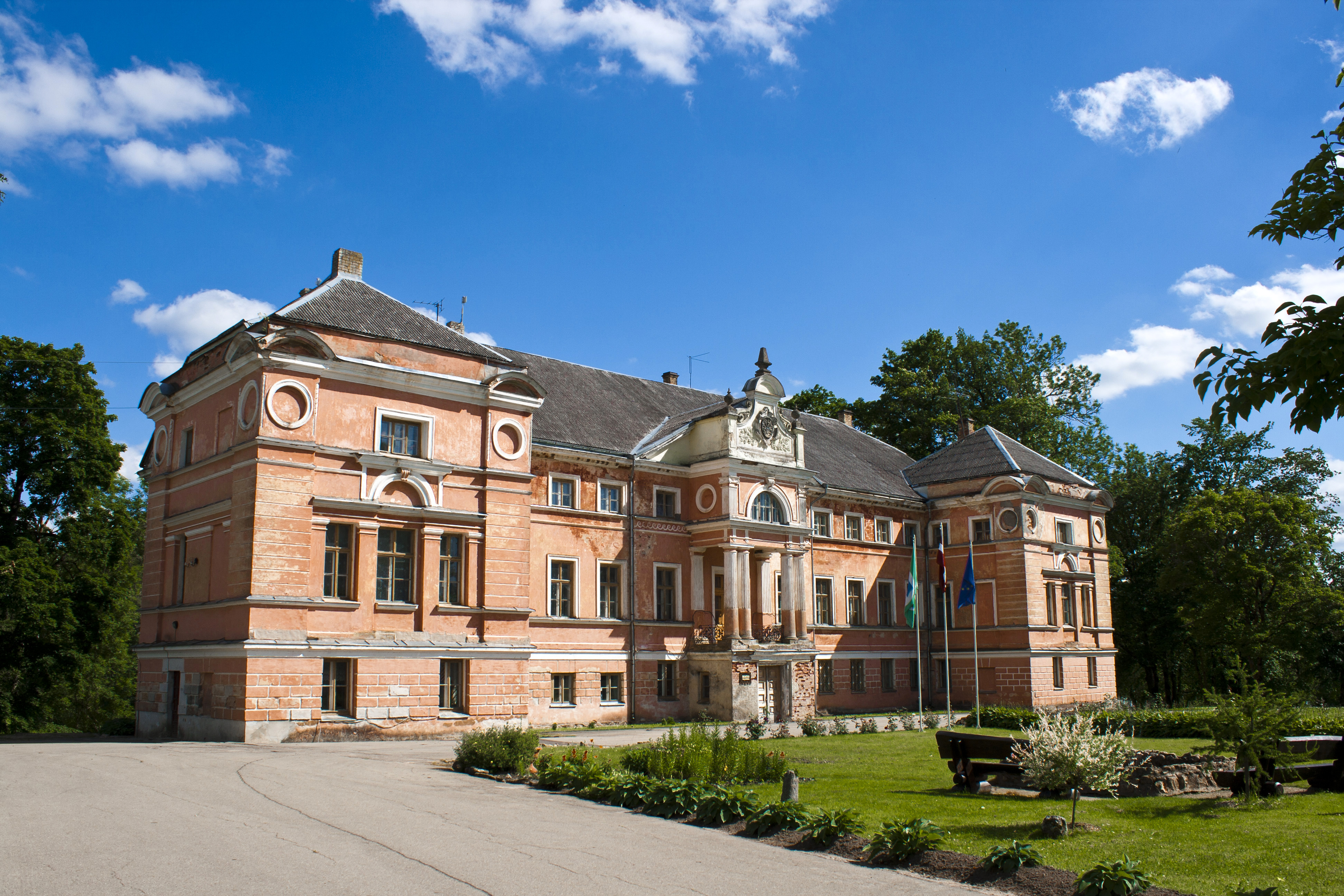
- Remte Manor

- Location within Latvia
- Coordinates: 56°44′28″N 22°41′30″E
- Country: Latvia
- Municipality: Saldus Municipality
- Parish: Remte Parish

Population
  - Total: 343

Remte is a village located in the Remte Parish of Saldus Municipality in the Courland region of Latvia. Located in the middle of the parish on the shores of Remte Lake and P109 national road. 17.5 km from Municipality center Saldus and 107 km from nation capital Riga. In Remte there is a parish administration, library, culture house, primary school, church, doctor's internist's practice, social care center "Atpūtas", post office, shop. Village has formed around the Remte Manor (Remten) center. After the Second World War, village grew around the Soviet Kolkhoz "Remte". The buildings of Remte Manor, the park and the Remte Lutheran Church are monuments of national significance.
