= Jaunlutriņi Parish =

Parish of Latvia

- parish of Latvia
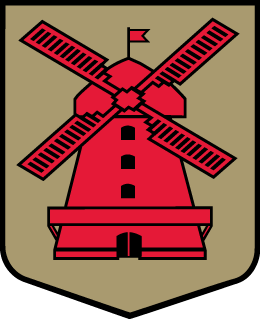
- Coat of arms

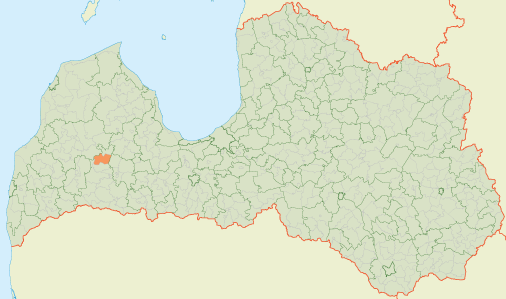
- 56°48′16″N 22°21′01″E
- Country: Latvia

Area
  - Total: 116.34 km^{2} (44.92 sq mi)
  - Land: 114.46 km^{2} (44.19 sq mi)
  - Water: 1.88 km^{2} (0.73 sq mi)

Population (1 January 2024)
  - Total: 657
  - Density: 5.6/km^{2} (15/sq mi)

Jaunlutriņi Parish (Latvian: Jaunlutriņu pagasts) is an administrative unit of Saldus Municipality in the Courland region of Latvia. It borders with Šķēde, Lutriņi and Zirņi parishes of its county. The center of the parish is Jaunlutriņi. The parish is administered by the joint Jaunlutriņi and Šķēde parish administration.

== History ==
The New Manor (Gut Neuhof, Jaunlutriņi) was historically located in the territory of modern Jaunlutriņi parish. The parish was founded in 1820. In 1890 it was added to Lutriņi parish together with Ošenieki and Mācītājsmuiža parishes. In 1945, Lutriņi, Jaunlutriņi and Ošenieki village councils were established in Lutriņi parish. In 1954, the village of Ošenieki was added to Jaunlutriņi village. In 1990, the village was reorganized into a parish. In 2009, the parish was included in Saldus municipality.

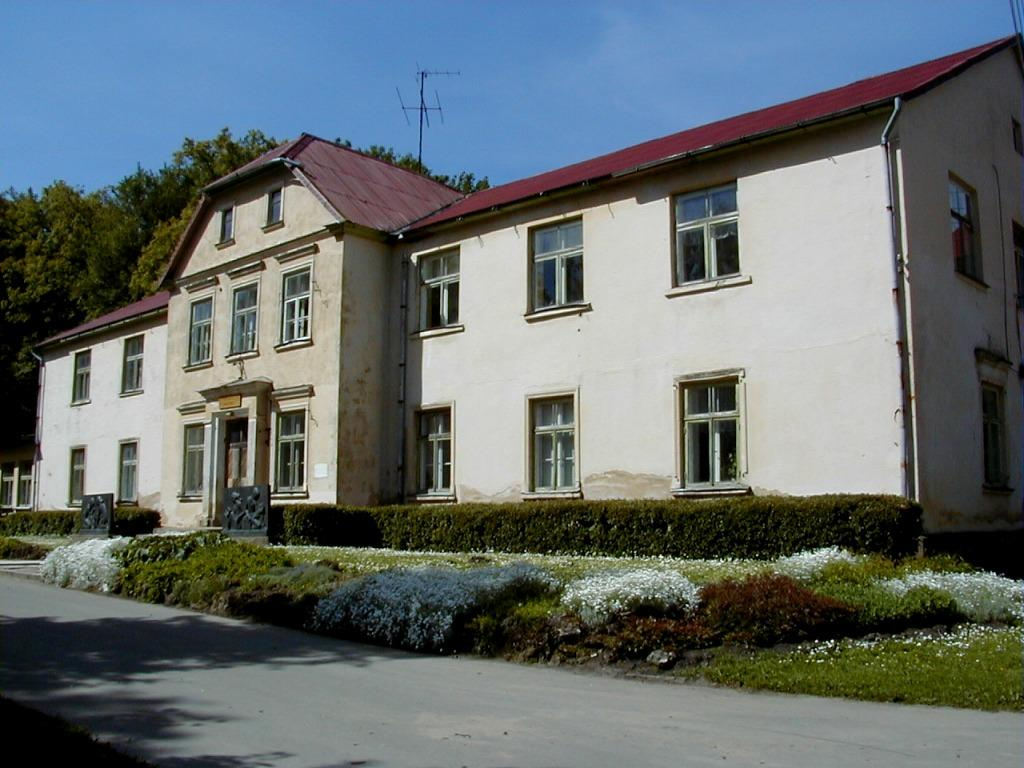
The Jaunmuiža Manor

== Education and culture ==
Between 1805 and 1840, education was provided by craftsman Otto Hercbergs, landlord of the "Christmas tree" Līze Lasis, and weaver Fridrihs Šube. From 1825 to 1890, there was a "ķesterskola" (lit. Chester school), where the Lutriņi parish ķesters worked. In 1840, a decision was made to establish a school in Lutriņi Parish. Until 1851, the school operated at the same time as the ķesterskola. In 1851, a new school building was built near the ķesters' house, allocating 20 plots of land from the manor (later increased by 30 plots). The school existed in this building until 1931. The school building was handed over to the parish, a shelter for the disabled was established there and it was named "Recreation". In 1840, another school started operating in "Rīkuti" on the other side of the parish. In 1885, a new house was built in the Silmaņi forest for the needs of educating these students. The school existed here until 1923, when it was added to Lutriņi 6th grade primary school in Jaunmuiza. The school was popularly called the Salmon School (teacher Gustavs Lasis). Lutriņi 6th grade primary school started operating in 1921 in the Lutriņi pastor's manor, because Jaunmuiza castle had not yet been handed over to the school. On December 17, 1923, the school was moved to Jaunmuiza Castle. O.
