= Žanis Bahs =

Latvian military personnel

- Born: 6 October 1885; Gaiķi Parish, Russian Empire
- Died: 16 October 1941 (aged 56); Kommunarka shooting ground, Moscow, Soviet Union
- Burial place: Kommunarka shooting ground
- Military career
- Allegiance: Russian Empire; Latvia
- Branch: Army
- Rank: General
- Commands: 4th. Zemgale infantry division
- Conflicts: World War I Latvian War of Independence
- Awards: Order of St. Stanislaus; Order of St. Anna; Order of Lāčplēsis; Order of the Three Stars; Order of Polonia Restituta; Estonian Cross of Liberty

Žanis Bahs (also Žanis Bachs; 6 October 1885 – 16 October 1941) was a Latvian general. He fought in World War I and later in the Latvian War of Independence, where he commanded a division in the Republic of Latvia. After the Soviet occupation of Latvia in 1940 Bahs was murdered by Soviet authorities.

== Early life ==
Žanis Bahs was born on 6 October 1885 in the Gaiķi Parish, Courland Governorate as an innkeeper's son. He studied at the commercial school in Riga and later started metallurgy studies at St. Petersburg Polytechnical Institute.

In 1912 he was drafted into the Russian Imperial Army and served in the 170th infantry regiment. He graduated the school of praporschik in 1913.

== World War I ==
After the start of the First World War Bahs served in the 174th and 540th infantry regiments. In December 1916, he was transferred to the Latvian Rifleman units and served in 2nd Riga Latvian rifleman regiment. After the Christmas Battles he was transferred back to the 540th infantry regiment in February 1917.

In August 1917 Bahs enlisted in the Russian academy of General staff and served in the headquarters of the 37th army corps as a poruchik.

In October 1917 he was promoted to the rank of stabskapitan. After the October Revolution Bahs was dismissed from the Red Army in February 1918 and returned to Latvia.

== Latvian War of Independence ==
Bahs enlisted in the newly formed Latvian Army on 13 December 1918. From April 1919 he served in the Northern Latvian brigade. After the Battle of Cēsis he was the Latvian military attache in Estonian-occupied Pskov. In July 1919 he was appointed commander of an Operative part of Latvian army. During the Bermontian attack Bahs served on the General Staff of the Latvian Army.

== Later life ==
After the Latvian War of Independence he served as a Latvian military attache in Soviet Russia in 1921-1922. In 1922 he was promoted to the rank of a colonel and appointed Chief of the Staff of the 2nd Vidzeme infantry division.

In 1934 he was appointed commander of the 5th Cēsis infantry regiment. In 1936 Bahs was promoted to the rank of a general and appointed commander of the 4th Zemgale infantry division and the Daugavpils city garrison.

After the Soviet occupation of Latvia, Bahs was arrested and deported to Moscow in December 1940. After long interrogations he was sentenced to death on 18 July 1941. He was shot and buried in Kommunarka shooting ground near Moscow on 16 October 1941.

Rehabilitated in April 1992 by the Prosecutor’s Office of the Russian Federation.

== See also ==
- List of Latvian Army generals
