= Remte Parish =

Parish of Latvia

- parish of Latvia
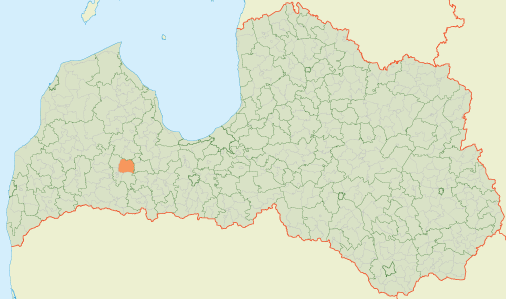
- 56°45′03″N 22°42′33″E
- Country: Latvia

Area
  - Total: 156.11 km^{2} (60.27 sq mi)
  - Land: 151.51 km^{2} (58.50 sq mi)
  - Water: 4.6 km^{2} (1.8 sq mi)

Population (1 January 2024)
  - Total: 599
  - Density: 3.8/km^{2} (9.9/sq mi)

Remte Parish (Latvian: Remtes pagasts) is an administrative unit of Saldus Municipality, Latvia. The administrative center is Remte village. It's located on the shore of Remtes Lake. The village was built around the Remte Manor.

== Towns, villages and settlements of Remte parish ==
- Kaulači
- Remte
- Smukas
- Stūrīši

== See also ==
- Remte Manor
