= Szabolcs Gál =

Hungarian footballer (born 1992)

Personal information
- Date of birth: 31 March 1992 (age 34)
- Place of birth: Budapest, Hungary
- Height: 1.86 m (6 ft 1 in)
- Position: Centre back

Team information
- Current team: Dunaföldvár

Youth career
- 2002–2008: Videoton
- 2008–2009: Ferencváros
- 2009–2010: Nyíregyháza
- 2010–2011: Diósgyőr

Senior career*
Years	Team	Apps	(Gls)
2010–2011	Diósgyőr	1	(0)
2011	Liberty Oradea		
2011–2012	Vasas	0	(0)
2012–2016	Ferencváros	0	(0)
2013	→ Velence SE (loan)	10	(3)
2013	→ Rákosmente (loan)	26	(1)
2014–2015	→ Pápa (loan)	6	(0)
2015–2016	→ Budaörs (loan)	10	(0)
2016–2017	Budaörs	10	(1)
2017	SZEOL	16	(0)
2017–2018	STC Salgótarján	15	(2)
2018	Putnok FC	12	(2)
2018–2019	SZEOL	27	(0)
2019–2020	Ózd FC	14	(0)
2020	Érdi VSE	2	(0)
2020–2022	Kecskemét	30	(7)
2022–2023	Kozármisleny	9	(1)
2023	Nyíregyháza Spartacus	4	(0)
2023–	Dunaföldvár	11	(3)
- * Club domestic league appearances and goals as of 15 October 2023

Szabolcs Gál (born 31 March 1992) is a Hungarian professional footballer who plays for Dunaföldvár.

== Career ==
On 14 July 2022, Gál joined Kozármisleny. On 24 February 2023, he moved to Nyíregyháza Spartacus on a contract until the end of the 2022–23 season.

== Career statistics ==
Appearances and goals by club, season and competition
Club	Season	League		Cup		League Cup		Europe		Total	
Club	Season	Apps	Goals	Apps	Goals	Apps	Goals	Apps	Goals	Apps	Goals
Nyíregyháza
Nyíregyháza	2009–10	0	0	0	0	1	0	0	0	1	0
Nyíregyháza	Total	0	0	0	0	1	0	0	0	1	0
Diósgyőr
Diósgyőr	2010–11	1	0	0	0	0	0	0	0	1	0
Diósgyőr	Total	1	0	0	0	0	0	0	0	1	0
Vasas
Vasas	2011–12	0	0	0	0	1	0	0	0	1	0
Vasas	Total	0	0	0	0	1	0	0	0	1	0
Velence
Velence	2012–13	12	3	3	0	0	0	0	0	15	3
Velence	Total	12	3	3	0	0	0	0	0	15	3
Rékosmente
Rékosmente	2013–14	26	1	1	0	0	0	0	0	27	1
Rékosmente	Total	26	1	1	0	0	0	0	0	27	1
Pápa
Pápa	2014–15	1	0	0	0	4	0	0	0	5	0
Pápa	Total	1	0	0	0	4	0	0	0	5	0
Career total		40	4	4	0	6	0	0	0	50	4

Updated to games played as of 18 November 2014.
