= Saša Popin =

Serbian footballer

Personal information
- Date of birth: 28 October 1989 (age 37)
- Place of birth: Bačka Topola, Yugoslavia
- Height: 2.02 m (6 ft 8 in)
- Position: Forward

Team information
- Current team: Vuteks-Sloga
- Number: 4

Senior career*
Years	Team	Apps	(Gls)
2008–2009	Mladost Apatin	12	(0)
2009	→ Veternik (loan)		
2010	Sliven 2000	0	(0)
2010–2011	Novi Sad	5	(0)
2012	Turnovo	15	(6)
2012	Novi Pazar	12	(1)
2013	Pandurii Târgu Jiu	3	(0)
2013	Săgeata Năvodari	3	(0)
2014–2015	Lombard-Pápa	26	(3)
2015–2017	Haladás Szombathely	14	(1)
2016	→ Sopron (loan)	4	(1)
2018	→ Sereď (loan)	13	(5)
2018	Nitra	0	(0)
2018	Zalaegerszeg	9	(0)
2019	Szeged-Csanád	8	(0)
2019–2020	Ermis Aradippou		
2020–	Vuteks-Sloga		
- * Club domestic league appearances and goals as of 00:00, 11 October 2021 (UTC)

Saša Popin (Serbian Cyrillic: Саша Попин; born 28 October 1989) is a Serbian footballer who plays for Vuteks-Sloga.

== Career ==
Popin was born in Bačka Topola, SR Serbia, back then still within Yugoslavia. After playing for numerous local clubs, he also played for Turnovo, FK Novi Sad, Mladost Apatin, Sliven 2000 and FK Novi Pazar. In the 2012/2013 season, he moved to FK Novi Pazar and played in Serbian SuperLiga. In 2012, he made his debut in Serbian SuperLiga playing against Radnički Kragujevac.

On 31 August 2019, Popin joined Cypriot club Ermis Aradippou.

== Honours ==
Pandurii

- Liga I: runner-up 2012–13
