= Máté Schmid =

Hungarian footballer

Personal information
- Full name: Máté Schmid
- Date of birth: 8 July 1996 (age 30)
- Place of birth: Budapest, Hungary
- Position: Forward

Team information
- Current team: Pápa
- Number: 61

Youth career
- 2010–2014: Újpest

Senior career*
Years	Team	Apps	(Gls)
2014–	Pápa	1	(0)
- * Club domestic league appearances and goals as of 30 November 2014

Máté Schmid (born 8 July 1996) is a Hungarian professional footballer who plays for Lombard-Pápa TFC.
