= Bálint Böröczky =

Hungarian footballer

Personal information
- Full name: Bálint Böröczky
- Date of birth: 18 March 1994 (age 32)
- Place of birth: Pápa, Hungary
- Height: 1.77 m (5 ft 10 in)
- Position: Midfielder

Team information
- Current team: FC Veszprém

Youth career
- 2005–2014: Pápa

Senior career*
| Years | Team | Apps | (Gls) |
| 2014–2015 | Pápa | 3 | (0) |
| 2015–2016 | Balatonfüredi | 31 | (1) |
| 2016– | FC Veszprém | 1 | (0) |
- * Club domestic league appearances and goals as of 24 August 2014

Bálint Böröczky (born 18 March 1994) is a Hungarian professional footballer who plays for FC Veszprém.
