= Martin Iványi =

Hungarian footballer

Personal information
- Full name: Martin Iványi
- Date of birth: 16 August 1995 (age 31)
- Place of birth: Pápa, Hungary
- Position: Midfielder

Team information
- Current team: Pápa
- Number: 63

Youth career
- 2005–2014: Pápa

Senior career*
Years	Team	Apps	(Gls)
2014–	Pápa	1	(0)
- * Club domestic league appearances and goals as of 6 December 2014

Martin Iványi (born 16 August 1995 in Pápa) is a Hungarian professional footballer who plays for Lombard-Pápa TFC.

== Career statistics ==
Appearances and goals by club, season and competition
Club	Season	League			Cup		League Cup		Europe		Total	
Club	Season	Division	Apps	Goals	Apps	Goals	Apps	Goals	Apps	Goals	Apps	Goals
Pápa	2014–15	Nemzeti Bajnokság I	1	0	0	0	3	0	0	0	4	0
Career total			1	0	0	0	3	0	0	0	4	0

Updated to games played as of 6 December 2014.
