= Remte Manor =

Manor house in Latvia

- Zemgale, Latvia
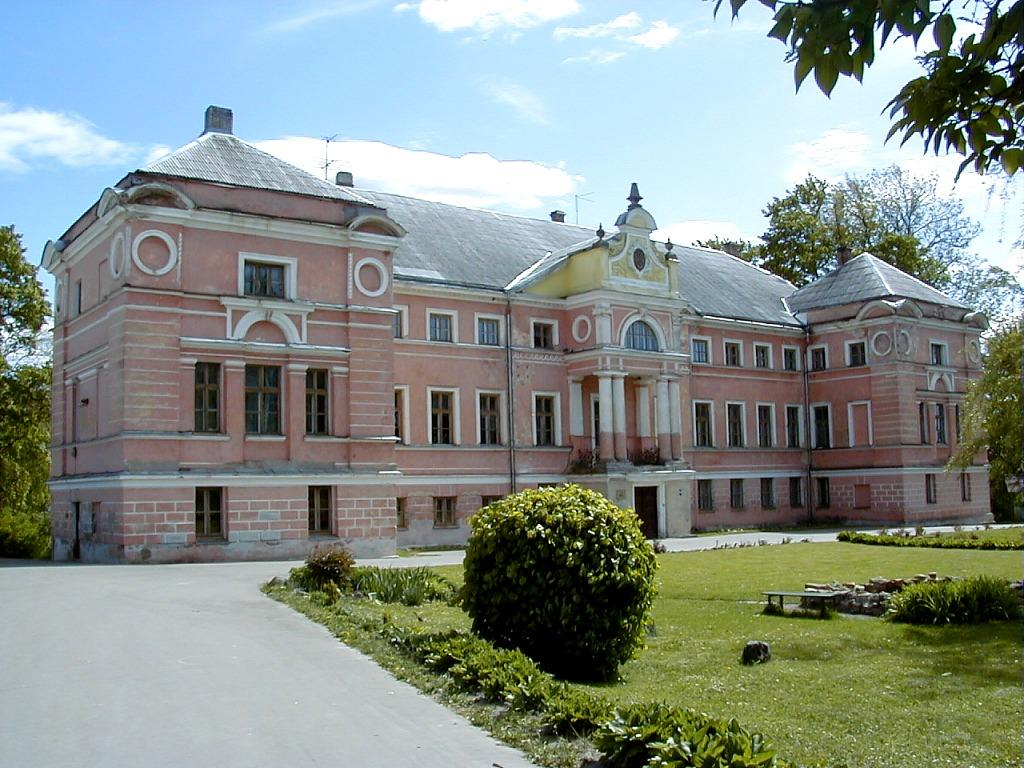

Site information
- Type: Manor

Location
- Coordinates: 56.7396°N 22.6941°E

Remte Manor (Latvian: Remtes muižas pils) is a manor house in the historical region of Courland, in Remte, Latvia. Originally built in 1800, it was modernized in 1880. The building currently houses the Remte primary school.

== History ==
The earliest records date back to 1509 when the manor was owned by Butlar. 190 years later the manor was taken over by the Brinckens, then by the Brucken. Since 1767 the manor belonged to Medem. The manor was expropriated from their family in 1920 and after that the Remte School is located there.

The manor was erected in 1800 Classicist style. In 1880 the manor was completely rebuilt so that the architectural style is now Neo-Renaissance. In 1893 the estates of Saldus telegraph line were introduced. The "Sphinx" relief at the manor was built in 1800. Gutted by fire in 1905, manor was restored in 1926.

The peaceful, scenic park around the manor has an alley called Swine Alley (Latvian: Cūku aleja ) which leads toward nearby Jaunpils. Park covers an area of 26 hectares. It is decorated with pavilions, columns, towers. The park has a system of ponds and canals.

== See also ==
- List of palaces and manor houses in Latvia
