= Pampāļi Parish =

Parish of Latvia

- parish of Latvia
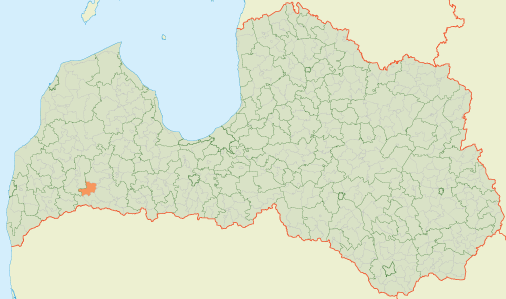
- 56°33′34″N 22°09′34″E
- Country: Latvia

Area
  - Total: 122.66 km^{2} (47.36 sq mi)
  - Land: 120.15 km^{2} (46.39 sq mi)
  - Water: 2.51 km^{2} (0.97 sq mi)

Population (1 January 2024)
  - Total: 495
  - Density: 4.0/km^{2} (10/sq mi)

Pampāļu Parish (Latvian: Pampāļu pagasts) is an administrative territorial entity of Saldus Municipality in the Courland region of Latvia.
