= Brocēni =

Town in Saldus Municipality, Latvia

- Town
- Flag Coat of arms

- Location in Latvia
- Coordinates: 56°40′N 22°34′E
- Country: Latvia
- Municipality: Saldus Municipality
- Town rights: 1992

Government
  - Mayor: Solvita Dūklava

Area
  - Total: 8.43 km^{2} (3.25 sq mi)
  - Land: 8.31 km^{2} (3.21 sq mi)
  - Water: 0.12 km^{2} (0.046 sq mi)
  - Rural territory: 100.349 km^{2} (38.745 sq mi)

Population (2026)
  - Total: 2,827
  - Density: 340/km^{2} (881/sq mi)
- Time zone: UTC+2 (EET)
  - Summer (DST): UTC+3 (EEST)
- Postal code: LV-3851; LV-3801
- Calling code: +371 638
- Number of city council members: 11
- Website: www.broceni.lv

Brocēni (German: Brotzen) is a town in Saldus Municipality in the Courland region of Latvia. The town is situated along the river Ciecere, near lake Cieceres, which contains a large deposit of limestone that is used in the manufacturing of cement. From 2009 to 2021, the town was the center of Brocēni Municipality.

A Portland cement and slate factory, currently the only one in Latvia, was built from 1936 to 1938 by the Riga-based A/S Ch. Schmit cement factory of H. H. Šmits. The initial capacity was 60 thousand tons of cement per year. In 1948, during the Soviet occupation of Latvia, operations were expanded with the start of the nationalized Brocēni Cement and Roofing Slate Plant, Brocēni Lime Plant and Saldus Brick Plant. After the restoration of the independence of Latvia, the factory continued work and in 2005 was acquired by Cemex. In 2019, Cemex sold its assets in the Baltic States and the Nordic countries to the German SCHWENK Zement GmbH & Co. KG.

Brocēni is also home to the Starts Brocēni football club and one of its successors, Brocēni NBJSS (Brocēni Municipality Children and Youth Sports School).

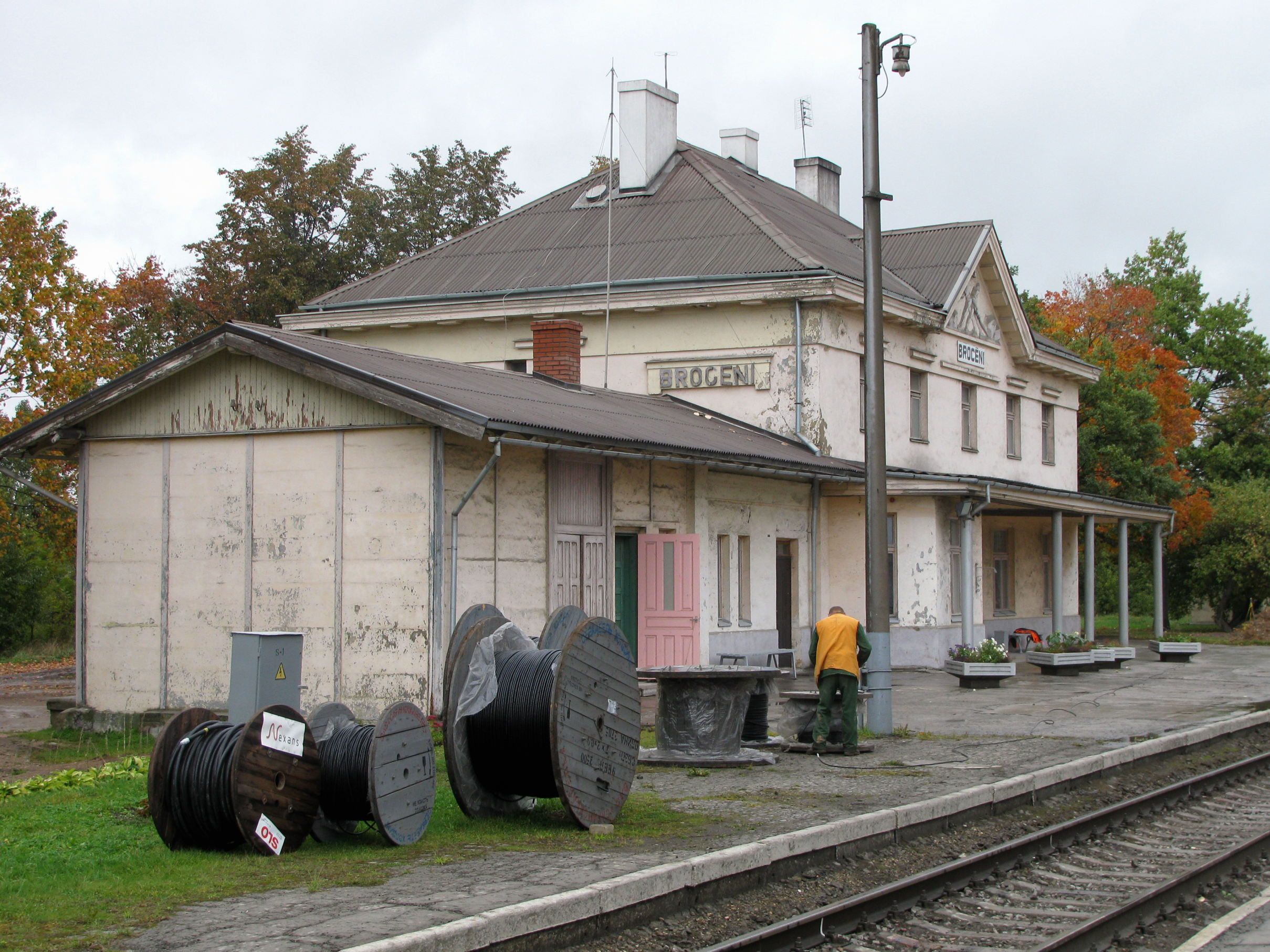
Brocēni train station

== Notable residents ==
- Vadims Žuļevs (born 1988), footballer
- Dons (singer) (born 1984), Latvia's representative for the Eurovision Song Contest 2024.

== See also ==
- List of cities and towns in Latvia
