= Saldus Parish =

Parish of Latvia

- parish of Latvia
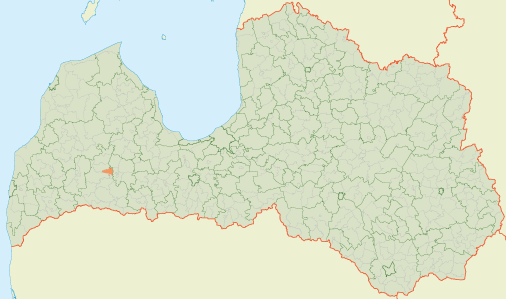
- 56°42′24″N 22°27′05″E
- Country: Latvia

Area
  - Total: 42.06 km^{2} (16.24 sq mi)
  - Land: 41.48 km^{2} (16.02 sq mi)
  - Water: 0.58 km^{2} (0.22 sq mi)

Population (1 January 2024)
  - Total: 1,331
  - Density: 32/km^{2} (82/sq mi)

Saldus Parish (Latvian: Saldus pagasts) is an administrative unit of Saldus Municipality in the Courland region of Latvia. It borders the town of Saldus and its administrative center, Druva.

Historically, the area was a part of the land of Kumbri Manor (German: Gut Kumbern), the center of which was located in modern-day Druva.

The parish is the birthplace of 19th century Latvian painter Janis Rozentāls. Rozentāls painted many portraits.

== Villages and settlements of Saldus Parish ==
- Druva (parish seat)
- Tiruļi
- Ziedonis
- Lagzdiņas
