= Nīgrande Parish =

Parish of Latvia

- parish of Latvia
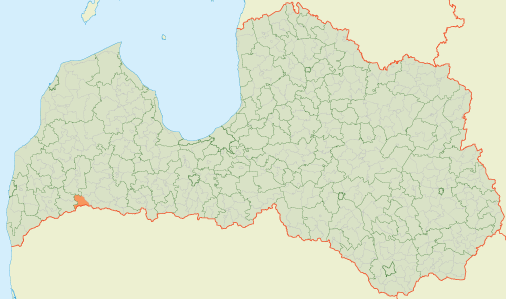
- 56°27′28″N 22°02′58″E
- Country: Latvia

Area
  - Total: 95.32 km^{2} (36.80 sq mi)
  - Land: 95.32 km^{2} (36.80 sq mi)
  - Water: 2.16 km^{2} (0.83 sq mi)

Population (1 January 2024)
  - Total: 1,039
  - Density: 11/km^{2} (28/sq mi)

Nīgrande Parish (Latvian: Nīgrandes pagasts) is an administrative unit of Saldus Municipality, in the Courland region of Latvia.

== Towns, villages and settlements of Nīgrande Parish ==
- Nīgrande
- Alši
- Atvari
- Dziras
- Kalni
- Meldzere
