= Ezere Parish =

Parish of Latvia

- parish of Latvia
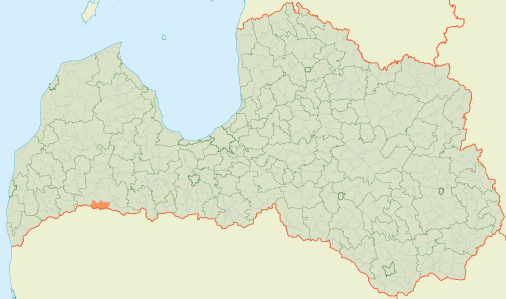
- 56°25′59″N 22°20′11″E
- Country: Latvia

Area
  - Total: 97.06 km^{2} (37.48 sq mi)
  - Land: 94.35 km^{2} (36.43 sq mi)
  - Water: 2.71 km^{2} (1.05 sq mi)

Population (1 January 2026)
  - Total: 892
  - Density: 9.45/km^{2} (24.5/sq mi)

Ezere Parish (Latvian: Ezeres pagasts) is an administrative unit of Saldus Municipality in the Courland region of Latvia. Its longitude is 22.3 and latitude is 56.4.
