= Zaņa Parish =

Parish of Latvia

- parish of Latvia
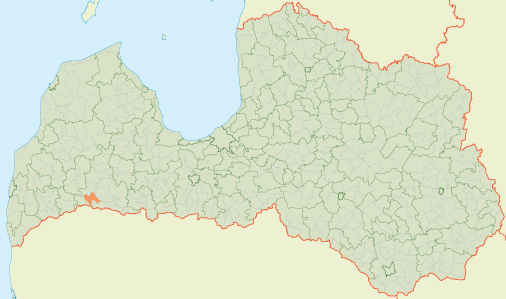
- 56°29′00″N 22°12′28″E
- Country: Latvia

Area
  - Total: 87.15 km^{2} (33.65 sq mi)
  - Land: 84.85 km^{2} (32.76 sq mi)
  - Water: 2.3 km^{2} (0.9 sq mi)

Population (1 January 2024)
  - Total: 477
  - Density: 5.5/km^{2} (14/sq mi)

Zaņa Parish (Latvian: Zaņas pagasts) is an administrative unit of Saldus Municipality in the Courland region of Latvia.
