= Vadims Žuļevs =

Latvian footballer

Personal information
- Date of birth: 1 March 1988 (age 38)
- Place of birth: Brocēni, Latvian SSR, Soviet Union (now Republic of Latvia)
- Height: 1.74 m (5 ft 9 in)
- Position: Right back

Youth career
- Brocēni

Senior career*
Years	Team	Apps	(Gls)
2006–2008	FC Daugava	39	(0)
2008–2009	Daugava Riga	13	(1)
2009–2011	Lombard-Pápa TFC	28	(0)
2012–2013	Jūrmala	28	(2)
2013–2014	Jelgava	37	(2)
2014–2015	Lombard-Pápa TFC	20	(1)
2015–2018	Ventspils	72	(1)
2019–2022	Liepāja	47	(1)

International career
2004–2005	Latvia U-17	9	(2)
2006–2007	Latvia U-19	7	(0)
2008–2010	Latvia U-21	22	(1)
2018	Latvia	1	(0)
- * Club domestic league appearances and goals

Vadims Žuļevs (born 1 March 1988) is a Latvian former footballer.

== Club career ==
As a youth player Žuļevs played in his home-town Brocēni, signing his first professional contract in 2006 with FK Daugava Daugavpils. Žuļevs played there for 2 years until 2008, making 24 league appearances and scoring no goals. In 2008, he left, signing with FK Daugava Riga. During 1 season there he played 13 matches, scoring 1 goal. In 2009, he went on trial with Nemzeti Bajnokság I club Lombard-Pápa TFC in Hungary and signed a contract with them, leaving Latvian Higher League. All over 3 seasons Žuļevs played 28 games for the Hungarian side. He left in 2012, joining FC Jūrmala in the Latvian Higher League. Žuļevs played 28 matches and scored 2 goals for Jūrmala in the 2012 season, finishing in the sixth place of the league table. In February 2013 he joined the Latvian Higher League club FK Jelgava. In May 2014 Žuļevs helped Jelgava win the Latvian Cup. In July 2014 Žuļevs returned to Hungary, signing a two-year contract with his previous club Lombard-Pápa TFC.

Žuļevs signed with FK Liepāja in the beginning of January 2019.

== International career ==
Žuļevs has made 22 appearances and scored one goal for Latvia U-21. He made his debut for Latvia national football team on 16 October 2018 in a 2018–19 UEFA Nations League D game against Georgia.

== Honours ==
- Latvian Cup winner (2): 2008, 2014
