= Novadnieki Parish =

Parish of Latvia

- parish of Latvia
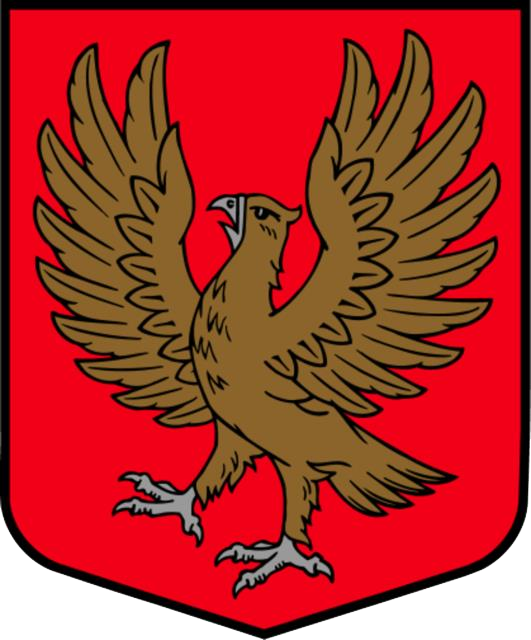
- Coat of arms

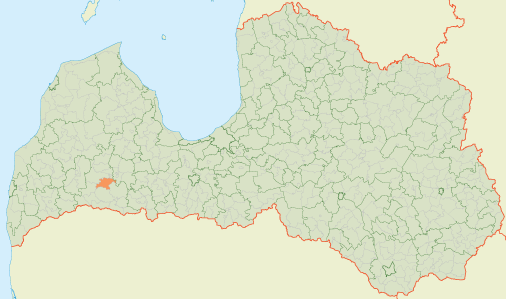
- 56°36′39″N 22°24′31″E
- Country: Latvia

Area
  - Total: 108.09 km^{2} (41.73 sq mi)
  - Land: 97.89 km^{2} (37.80 sq mi)
  - Water: 10.2 km^{2} (3.9 sq mi)

Population (1 January 2024)
  - Total: 1,491
  - Density: 14/km^{2} (36/sq mi)

Novadnieki Parish (Latvian: Novadnieku pagasts) is an administrative unit of Saldus Municipality in the Courland region of Latvia.
