= Šķēde Parish =

Parish of Latvia

- parish of Latvia
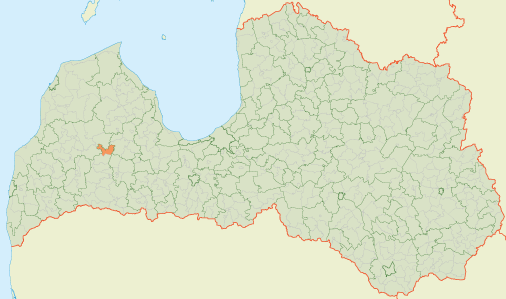
- 56°52′53″N 22°24′44″E
- Country: Latvia

Area
  - Total: 87.93 km^{2} (33.95 sq mi)
  - Land: 86.22 km^{2} (33.29 sq mi)
  - Water: 1.71 km^{2} (0.66 sq mi)

Population (1 January 2024)
  - Total: 430
  - Density: 4.9/km^{2} (13/sq mi)

Šķēde Parish (Latvian: Šķēdes pagasts) is an administrative unit of Saldus Municipality in the Courland region of Latvia.
