= Kursīši Parish =

Parish of Latvia

- parish of Latvia
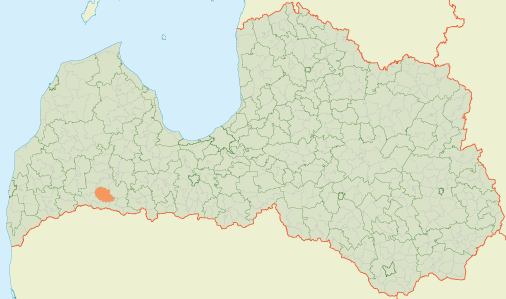
- 56°30′53″N 22°23′23″E
- Country: Latvia

Area
  - Total: 171.13 km^{2} (66.07 sq mi)
  - Land: 168.31 km^{2} (64.98 sq mi)
  - Water: 2.82 km^{2} (1.09 sq mi)

Population (1 January 2024)
  - Total: 660
  - Density: 3.9/km^{2} (10.0/sq mi)

Kursīši Parish (Latvian: Kursišu pagasts) is an administrative unit of Saldus Municipality in the Courland region of Latvia.
