= Blīdene Parish =

Parish of Latvia

- parish of Latvia
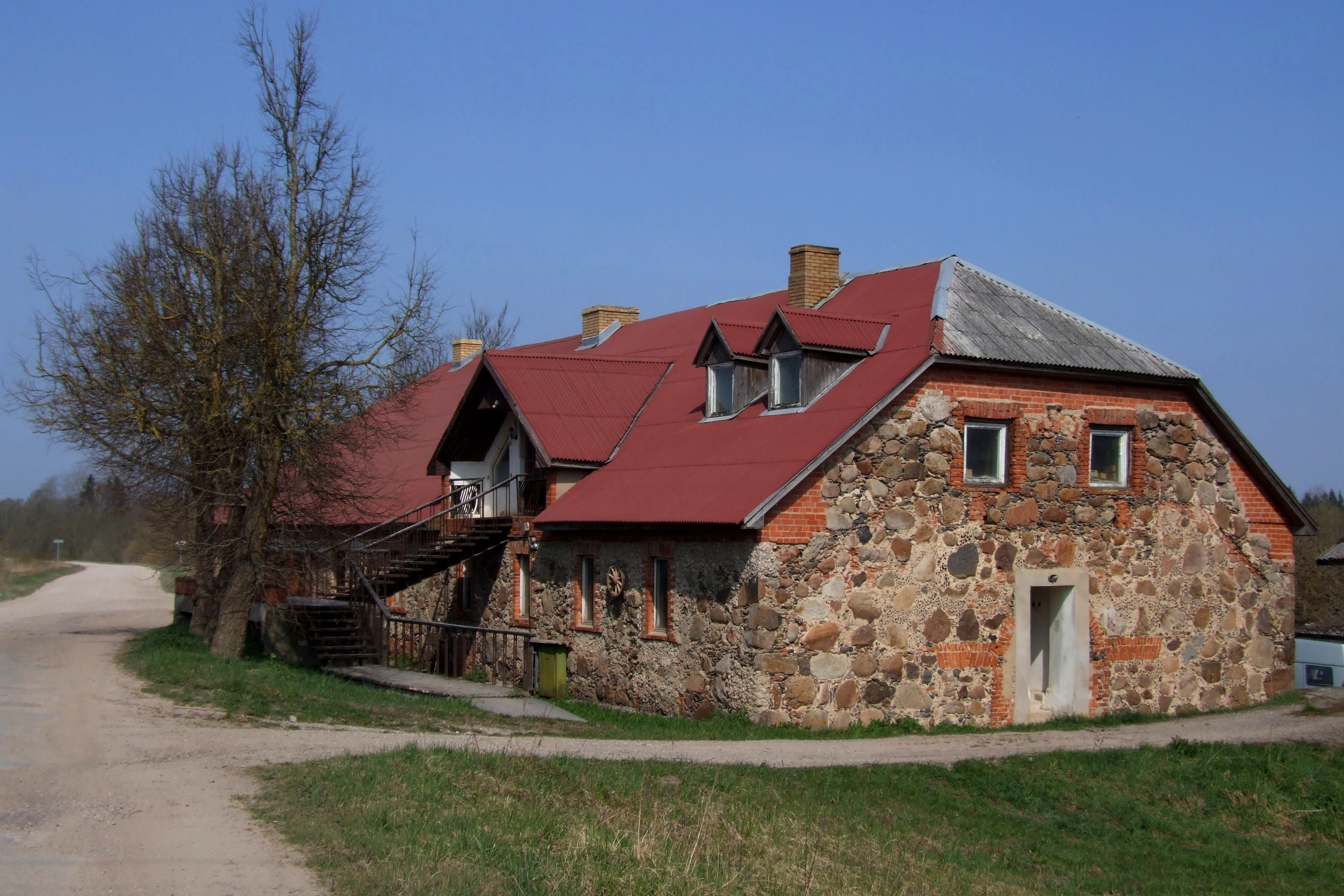

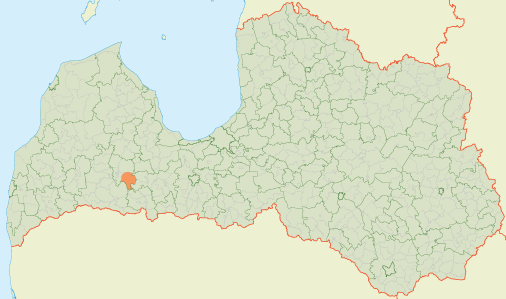
- 56°38′36″N 22°44′48″E
- Country: Latvia

Area
  - Total: 134.44 km^{2} (51.91 sq mi)
  - Land: 134.44 km^{2} (51.91 sq mi)
  - Water: 3.65 km^{2} (1.41 sq mi)

Population (1 January 2024)
  - Total: 594
  - Density: 4.4/km^{2} (11/sq mi)

Blīdene Parish (Latvian: Blīdenes pagasts) is an administrative unit of Saldus Municipality in the Courland region of Latvia. The administrative center is Blīdene village.

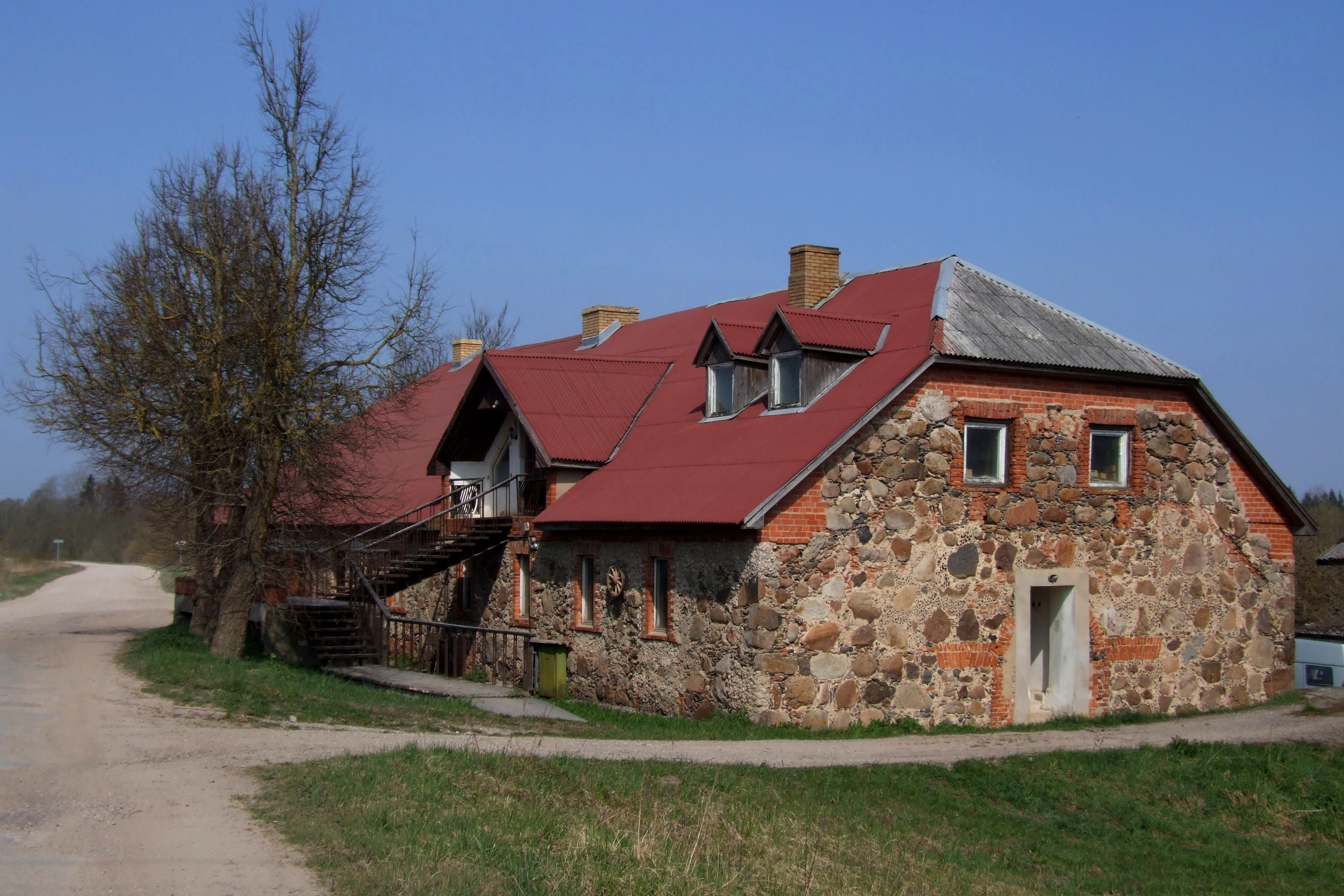
Old roadside tavern in Blīdene

== Towns, villages and settlements of Blīdene parish ==
- Blīdene
- Pilsblīdene
- Stūri
