= Vadakste Parish =

Parish of Latvia

- parish of Latvia
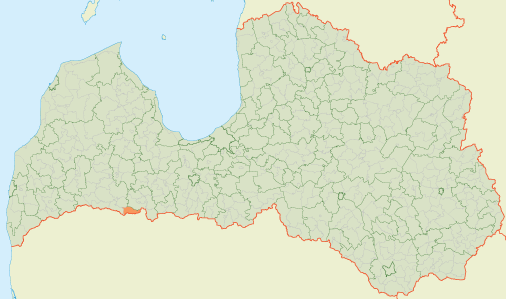
- 56°23′29″N 22°46′46″E
- Country: Latvia

Area
  - Total: 72.05 km^{2} (27.82 sq mi)
  - Land: 70.33 km^{2} (27.15 sq mi)
  - Water: 1.72 km^{2} (0.66 sq mi)

Population (1 January 2024)
  - Total: 283
  - Density: 3.9/km^{2} (10/sq mi)

Vadakste Parish (Latvian: Vadakstes pagasts) is an administrative unit of Saldus Municipality in the Semigallia region of Latvia.
