= Gaiķi Parish =

Parish of Latvia

- parish of Latvia
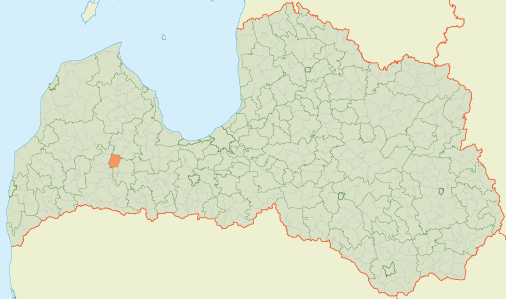
- 56°47′30″N 22°32′18″E
- Country: Latvia

Area
  - Total: 105.75 km^{2} (40.83 sq mi)
  - Land: 104.29 km^{2} (40.27 sq mi)
  - Water: 1.46 km^{2} (0.56 sq mi)

Population (1 January 2024)
  - Total: 592
  - Density: 5.6/km^{2} (14/sq mi)

Gaiķi Parish (Latvian: Gaiķu pagasts) is an administrative unit of Saldus Municipality in the Courland region of Latvia. The administrative center is Satiķi village.

== Towns, villages and settlements of Gaiķi parish ==
- Gaiķi
- Lielsatiķi
- Muižciems
- Satiķi
- Vecgaiķi
