= Lake Ciecere =

Lake in Latvia

- Cieceres ezers (Latvian)
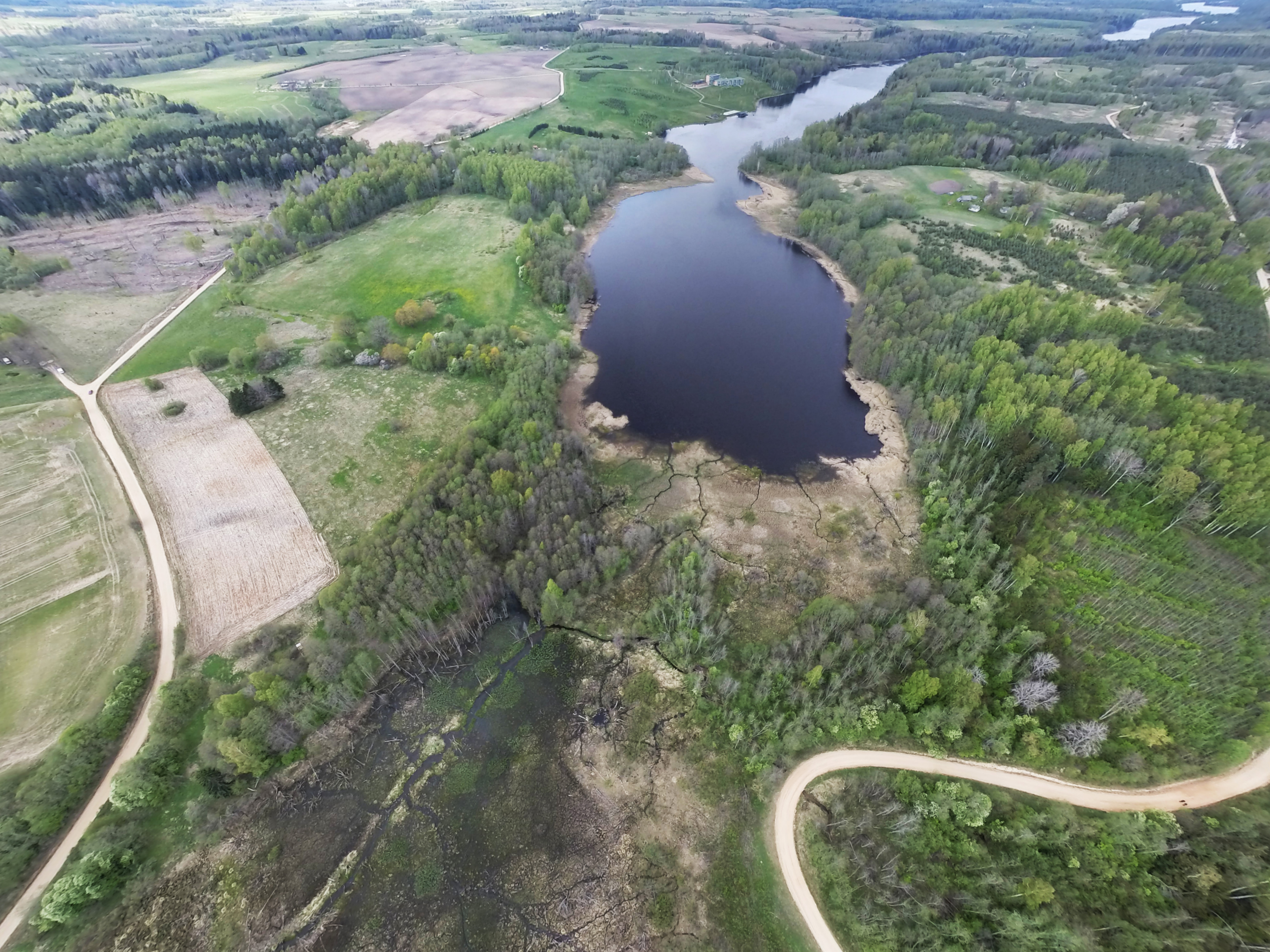
- Aerial view of Lake Ciecere

- Location within Latvia
- Location: Saldus Municipality
- Coordinates: 56°39′21″N 22°33′38″E
- Primary inflows: Dūņupe, Mazupe
- Primary outflows: Ciecere
- Basin countries: Latvia
- Max. length: 9.5 km (5.9 mi)
- Max. width: 0.4 km (0.25 mi)
- Surface area: 2.768 km^{2} (1.069 sq mi)
- Average depth: 7.2 m (24 ft)
- Max. depth: 22 m (72 ft)
- Surface elevation: 100.3 m (329 ft)
- Islands: Oak Island
- Settlements: Brocēni

Lake Ciecere (Latvian: Cieceres ezers) is a lake in the southern part of Latvia, near the town of Brocēni in Saldus Municipality, Latvia. The lake has the status of a nature reserve.

== Geography ==
The area of the lake is 276.8 hectares. The lake is stretched from north to south; its length is 9.5 km, and its maximum width is 0.4 km.

It is a proglacial lake located in a furrow and is the most expressive example of this type of lake in Latvia. In some places the lake is reminiscent of a river. It is sandy and muddy. Its shores are in places cliffs. One large island is Oak Island (Latvian: Ozolu), which has an area of 14 hectares.

From 1923 to 1977 this island had the status of a natural monument, and from 1977 to 1999 it was a botanical reserve.

The rivers Dunupe and Mazupe flow into the lake, and the river Ciecere flows out of it.

Previously, it was believed that lake has a maximum depth of 50 m, but measurements carried out in 2000 showed that it is no deeper than 22 m.

== Fauna ==
There are seven species of fish in the lake, including common carp, northern pike, European eel, and zander.
