= Ruba Parish =

Parish of Latvia

- parish of Latvia
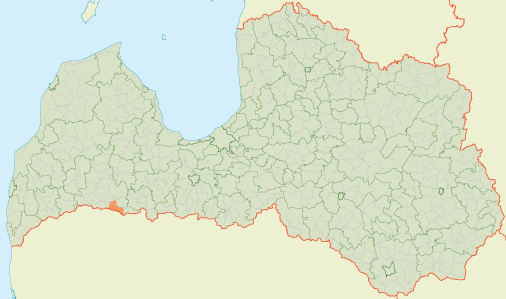
- 56°24′59″N 22°34′00″E
- Country: Latvia

Area
  - Total: 85.22 km^{2} (32.90 sq mi)
  - Land: 85.22 km^{2} (32.90 sq mi)
  - Water: 1.55 km^{2} (0.60 sq mi)

Population (1 January 2025)
  - Total: 568
  - Density: 6.67/km^{2} (17.3/sq mi)

Ruba Parish (Latvian: Rubas pagasts) is an administrative unit of Saldus Municipality in the Semigallia region of Latvia.
