= Zirņi Parish =

Parish of Latvia

- parish of Latvia
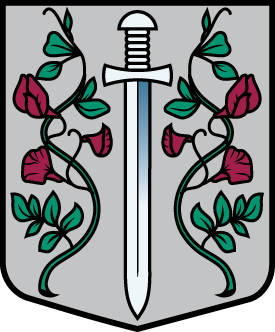
- Coat of arms

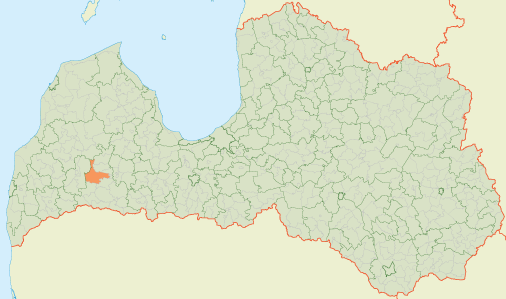
- 56°40′27″N 22°15′09″E
- Country: Latvia

Area
  - Total: 200.26 km^{2} (77.32 sq mi)
  - Land: 200.26 km^{2} (77.32 sq mi)
  - Water: 5.18 km^{2} (2.00 sq mi)

Population (1 January 2024)
  - Total: 1,311
  - Density: 6.5/km^{2} (17/sq mi)

Zirņi Parish (Latvian: Zirņu pagasts) is an administrative unit of Saldus Municipality in the Courland region of Latvia.
