= Lutriņi Parish =

Parish of Latvia

- parish of Latvia
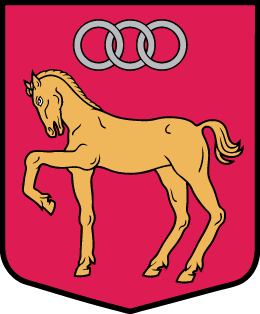
- Coat of arms

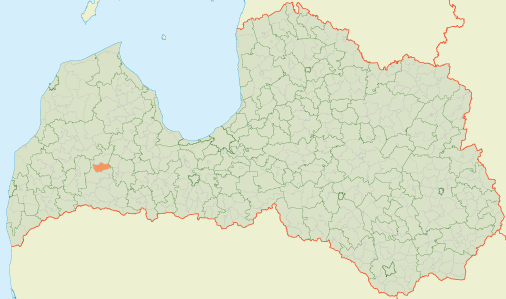
- 56°44′19″N 22°20′10″E
- Country: Latvia

Area
  - Total: 90.43 km^{2} (34.92 sq mi)
  - Land: 87.71 km^{2} (33.87 sq mi)
  - Water: 2.72 km^{2} (1.05 sq mi)

Population (1 January 2024)
  - Total: 1,066
  - Density: 12/km^{2} (31/sq mi)

Lutriņi Parish (Latvian: Lutriņu pagasts) is an administrative unit of Saldus Municipality in the Courland region of Latvia.

== Towns, villages and settlements of Lutriņi Parish ==
- Lašupe
- Lutriņi - parish administrative center
- Namiķi
