= Jaunauce Parish =

Parish of Latvia

- parish of Latvia
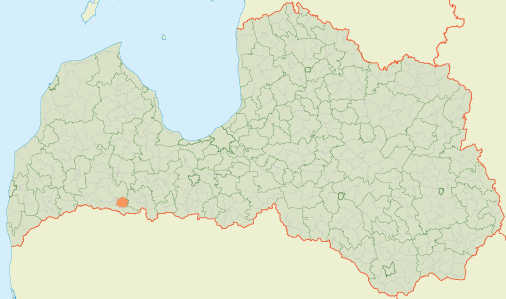
- 56°27′26″N 22°39′32″E
- Country: Latvia

Area
  - Total: 81.76 km^{2} (31.57 sq mi)
  - Land: 81.76 km^{2} (31.57 sq mi)
  - Water: 1.41 km^{2} (0.54 sq mi)

Population (1 January 2024)
  - Total: 251
  - Density: 3.1/km^{2} (8.0/sq mi)

Jaunauce Parish (Latvian: Jaunauces pagasts) is an administrative unit of Saldus Municipality in the Semigallia region of Latvia.
