= Saldus Municipality =

Municipality of Latvia

Coordinates: 56°40′N 22°30′E

Saldus Municipality Saldus novads
- Municipality
- Flag Coat of arms

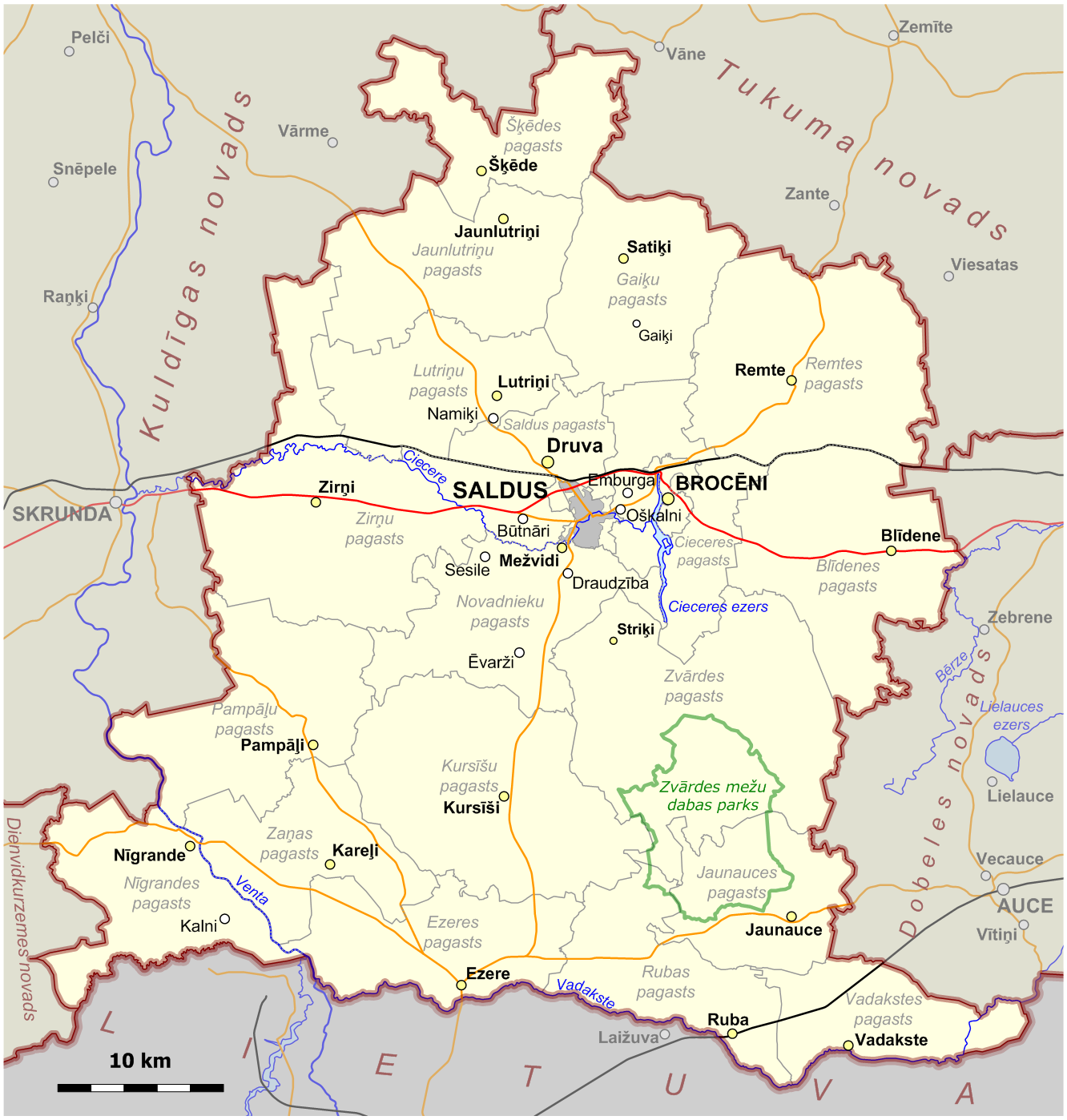
- Country: Latvia
- Merged: 2021
- Centre: Saldus

Government
  - Council Chair: Māris Zusts (LZP)

Area
  - Total: 2,179.4 km^{2} (841.5 sq mi)

Population (2021)
  - Total: 27,110
  - Density: 12.44/km^{2} (32.22/sq mi)
- Postal code: LV-3801
- Website: saldus.lv

Saldus Municipality (Latvian: Saldus novads) is a municipality in Courland, Latvia. The municipality was formed in 2021 by merging the former Saldus Municipality and Brocēni Municipality. Its centre is the town of Saldus.

It contains 19 parishes and 2 towns/cities - Saldus and Brocēni. The population in 2021 was 27,110.

The municipality has an international partnership with Bakhmut urban hromada in Ukraine. It borders Lithuania.

== History ==
The municipality, previously a part of Kuldīga county, was first created during the Soviet occupation of Latvia in 1949 as Saldus district. The district was divided up during the administrative-territorial reform in 2009 into Brocēni Municipality and Saldus Municipality. In 2021 they were merged again into a current Saldus Municipality.

== Administrative units and population ==
Territorial unit	Population (year)
Ezere Parish	972 (2021)
Jaunauce Parish	277 (2021)
Jaunlutriņi Parish	656 (2021)
Kursīši Parish	697 (2021)
Lutriņi Parish	1,072 (2021)
Nīgrande Parish	1,099 (2021)
Novadnieki Parish	1,504 (2021)
Pampāļi Parish	521 (2021)
Ruba Parish	609 (2021)
Saldus	9,679 (2021)
Saldus Parish	1,359 (2021)
Šķēde Parish	453 (2021)
Vadakste Parish	300 (2021)
Zaņa Parish	539 (2021)
Zirņi Parish	1,372 (2021)
Zvārde Parish	329 (2021)
Brocēni	2,830 (2021)
Ciecere Parish	898 (2021)
Gaiķi Parish	675 (2021)
Remte Parish	618 (2021)
Blīdene Parish	651 (2021)

== Patron of the University of Latvia ==
Saldus Municipality is a silver patron of the University of Latvia Foundation. Supported the University of Latvia in 2013-2019, when it established a scholarship “Medusmaize”, which is intended for young people of their region who, after graduating from high school, start basic studies in one of the Latvian universities. If the criteria are met, support is provided throughout the bachelor's degree.

== Notable people ==
- Emil Bretschneider (1833 in Benkavas muiža – 1901), a Baltic German sinologist, physician and diplomat
- Adolf Strümpell (1853 in Jaunauce Parish – 1925), was a Baltic German neurologist.
- Karl Hans Bernewitz (1858 in Blīdene – 1934), a Baltic German sculptor.
- Karlis Irbe (1861 in Brocēni – 1934), prelate, the first bishop of the Evangelical Lutheran Church of Latvia, 1922 to 1931.
- Janis Rozentāls (1866 in Bebri Farmstead – 1916), an Impressionism and Art Nouveau painter.
- Žanis Bahs (1885 in Gaiķi Parish – 1941), a Latvian general.
- Jānis Rudzutaks (1887 in Kursīši Parish – 1938). a Latvian Bolshevik revolutionary and a Soviet politician.
- Kārlis Kļava (1907 in Zvārde Parish – 1943), military officer and sports shooter, competed in the 1936 Summer Olympics.
- Jānis Klovāns (1935 in Ruba Parish – 2010), chess player who held the FIDE title of Grandmaster
- Dons (born 1984 in Brocēni), singer and songwriter, real name Artūrs Šingirejs
- Vadims Žuļevs (born 1988 in Brocēni), a Latvian footballer who played 250 games

== See also ==
- Administrative divisions of Latvia
