= Jānis Matulis =

Lutheran bishop in Latvia (1911–1985)

The Most Reverend Jānis Matulis
- Archbishop of Riga
- Church: Evangelical Lutheran Church of Latvia
- Archdiocese: Riga
- See: Riga
- Elected: 22 February 1969
- In office: 1969–1985
- Predecessor: Gustavs Tūrs
- Successor: Ēriks Mesters

Orders
- Ordination: 9 June 1943
- Consecration: 14 September 1969 by Sven Danell

Personal details
- Born: 21 February 1911 Kaluga, Russian Empire
- Died: 19 August 1985 (aged 74) Riga, Latvian SSR
- Occupation: Archbishop

Jānis Matulis (21 February 1911 – 19 August 1985) was a Latvian prelate of the Evangelical Lutheran Church of Latvia and Archbishop of Riga from 1969 to 1985.

== Biography ==
Matulis was born on 21 February 1911 in Kaluga, in the Russian Empire in present-day Russia, to a family of servants. In 1919, he attended school in Latvia. In 1925, he graduated from elementary school and passed the competition at the Riga Teachers' Institute and graduated in 1930. From 1932 to 1936 he worked in several schools in Riga, studying at the Department of Mathematics at the University of Latvia in the Department of Natural Sciences. From 1936 to 1943 he studied theology on a scale cum laude, by the Faculty work "Kāds EVED-JAHVE problēmas atrisinājuma mēģinājums".

On 9 June 1943 he was ordained in St John's church. In 1944 Matulis became the parish priest of Kandava church. In 1946 he was transferred to Talsi where he remained for 22 years. In 1965, Archbishop Gustavs Tūrs gave him the title of superintendent. On 22 February 1969, during an Extraordinary General Synod of the Evangelical Lutheran Church after the death of Archbishop Elect Pēteris Kleperis, Matulis was elected as Archbishop of Riga and the Evangelical Lutheran Church of Latvia. Sven Danell, the Bishop of Skara in Sweden, consecrated him on 14 September 1969 and consequently restored the apostolic succession in the Latvian church. Mutalis received the staff of the first bishop of restored Archbishopric of Riga, Kārļa Irbes. On 3 June 1972 Mutalis lost his wife Margarita. He was awarded two theological doctorate "honora causa" (honorary doctorate) degrees – in 1973 from the Budapest Theological Academy and in 1980 – University of Erlangen. Archbishop Mutalis is mostly remembered for his decision to ordain women to the priesthood in the Church of Latvia in 1975. This decision was reversed in 2016 by the current archbishop, Jānis Vanags. Archbishop Jānis Matulis died on 19 August 1985.
