= Teodors Grīnbergs =

Latvian theologian (1870–1962)

The Most Reverend Teodors Grīnbergs
- Archbishop of Riga
- Church: Evangelical Lutheran Church of Latvia
- Archdiocese: Riga
- See: Riga
- Elected: 1932
- In office: 1932–1944
- Predecessor: Kārlis Irbe
- Successor: Gustavs Tūrs

Orders
- Ordination: 21 May 1899

Personal details
- Born: 2 April 1870 Ģibzde, Courland Governorate, Russian Empire
- Died: 14 June 1962 (aged 92) Esslingen am Neckar, West Germany
- Occupation: Archbishop
- Education: University of Tartu

Teodors Grīnbergs (2 April 1870 - 14 June 1962) was a Latvian prelate of the Evangelical Lutheran Church of Latvia and its first archbishop from 1932. He was forcibly taken into exile in Germany in 1944. He continued to serve as archbishop of the Evangelical Lutheran Church of Latvia in exile (later officially known as The Evangelical Lutheran Church of Latvia in Exile, and after that as The Latvian Evangelical Lutheran Church Abroad) at which post he served until his death.

== Biography ==
Grīnbergs was born into a family of farmers in Ģibzdes manor in "Mazlejas" (now Valdgale Parish) of Dundaga parish. He studied in Pope, Ģibzde, Talsi and Jelgava. From 1891 to 1896 he studied Theology at the University of Tartu. He became a member of the oldest Latvian student corporation Lettonia. From 1899 to 1932 he served as a pastor in Lutrīne and Ventspils. Along with his duties in the church he also worked as a teacher in Ventspils and even as Chairman of the City Council.

In 1929 the Faculty of Theology of the University of Latvia awarded Grīnbergs an honorary doctorate, and in 1932 he was elected as an external professor. In the same year he was elected Archbishop of the Evangelical Lutheran Church of Latvia, the first prelate with this title. His predecessor, Bishop Kārlis Irbe, was known as the bishop in charge of the Evangelical Lutheran Church of Latvia. However, due to an ongoing dispute concerning the ownership of the Rīga Dom. which prompted the resignation of his predecessor in 1932, Grīnbergs was not consecrated as Bishop, but rather inducted by his fellow pastors. Archbishop Eidem of Uppsala wished Kārlis Irbe to take part in the consecration that was planned, but he refused. For this reason Archbishop Eidem never performed the consecration. Grīnbergs retained the title of archbishop in 1944 when he went into exile. During his term in office, a new Hymn Book and a new edition of the New Testament were issued. In July 1938, an agreement for intercommunion with the Anglican Church of England was achieved . In the second half of 1944, the occupying German authorities exiled the archbishop, along with the leaders of other churches to Germany. Archbishop Grīnbergs continued to lead the church in exile until his death at Esslingen am Neckar in West Germany on 14 June 1962.

He was a recipient of the Order of the Three Stars.
