= Gailītis =

Family name

Origin
- Origin: Latvian
- Meaning: "rooster"
- Region of origin: Latvia

Other names
- Variant form: Gailis

Gailītis (feminine: Gailīte) is a Latvian masculine surname, a diminutive of the word gailis, meaning "rooster/cockerel".

Individuals with the surname include:

- Alfrēds Gailītis (1900–1980), Latvian politician
- Guntis Gailītis (born 1949), Latvian theatre director
- Jānis Gailītis (born 1985), Latvian basketball player and coach
- Kārlis Gailītis (1936–1992), Latvian Lutheran archbishop
- Markuss Gailītis (1882–1942), Latvian politician
- Pauls Gailītis (1869—1943), Latvian Lutheran clergyman, politician and public figure
