= Latvian Evangelical Lutheran Church in America =

- Latviešu evaņģēliski luteriskā baznīca Amerikā
- Abbreviation: LELBA
- Classification: Lutheran
- Associations: Latvian Evangelical Lutheran Church Worldwide
- Region: United States
- Origin: 1957/1972; Milwaukee, Wisconsin
- Congregations: 68 (2007)
- Members: 12,000 (2007)
- Official website: https://www.lelba.org/

The Latvian Evangelical Lutheran Church in America (Latvian: Latviešu evaņģēliski luteriskā baznīca Amerikā, abbreviated LELBA) is a Lutheran denomination, formed in 1957 as a federation, and reorganized in 1975 as a formal denomination. In 1978, Lauma Lagzdins Zusevics was ordained as the first woman to serve as a full-time minister for the LELBA. In 2014 she became the first female Lutheran bishop in Latvian history, as the Evangelical Lutheran Church of Latvia proper does not recognize women's ordination.

As of 2007, 12,000 congregants and 68 congregations of the church were present in the United States. It is headquartered in Milwaukee, Wisconsin.

== See also ==
- Latvian Evangelical Lutheran Church Abroad
