= Auziņš =

Family name

Origin
- Origin: Latvian
- Meaning: "oats"

Auziņš (feminine: Auziņa) is a Latvian masculine surname, derived from the Latvian word for "oats" (auzas). Individuals with the surname include:

- Aleksejs Auziņš (1910–1997), Latvian footballer
- Igor Auzins (born 1949), Australian filmmaker
- Imants Auziņš (1937–2013), Latvian poet and literary critic
- Mārcis Auziņš (born 1956), Latvian physicist
