= Church of Christ, Riga =

Church building in Riga, Latvia

Church of Christ
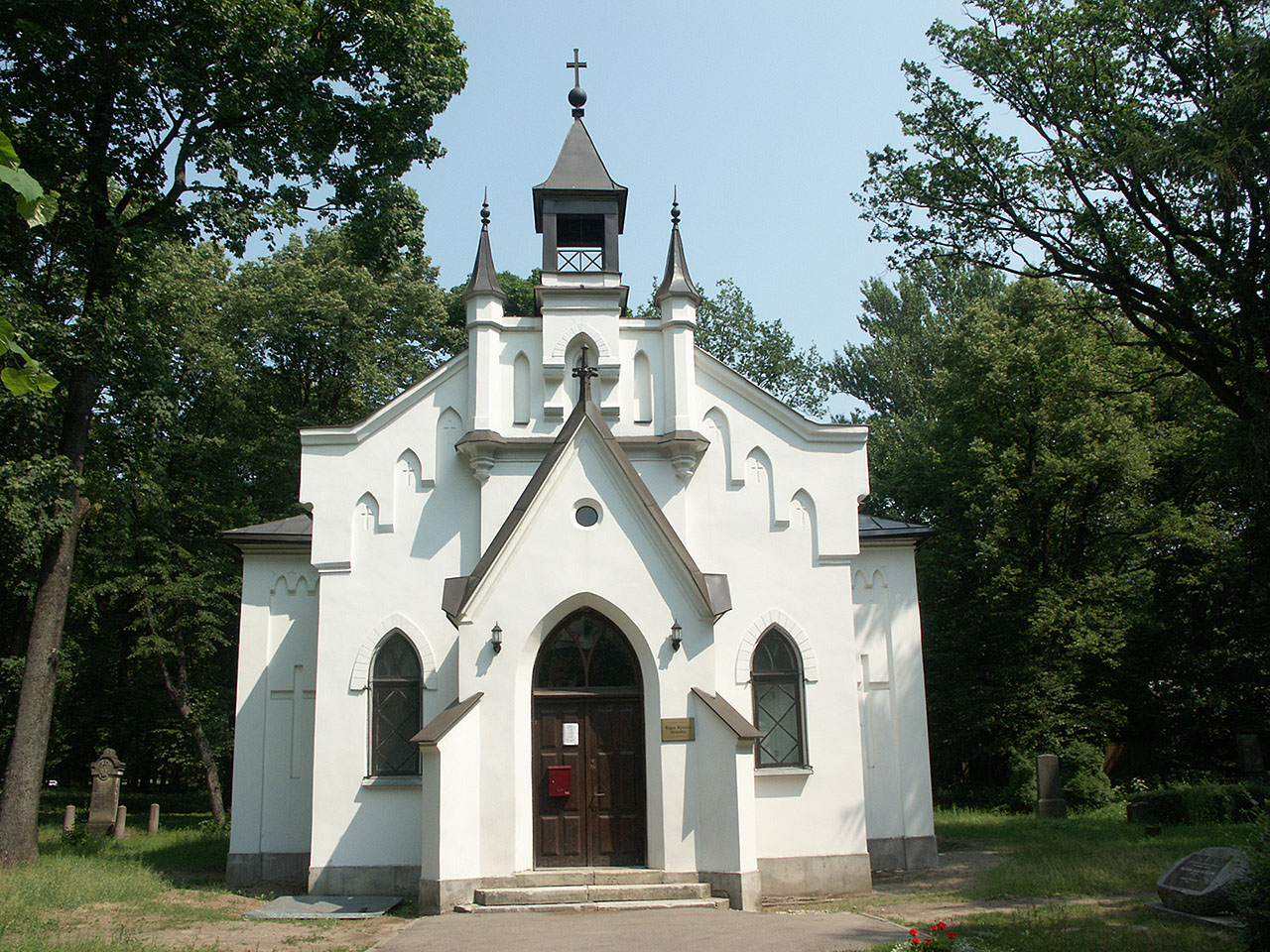

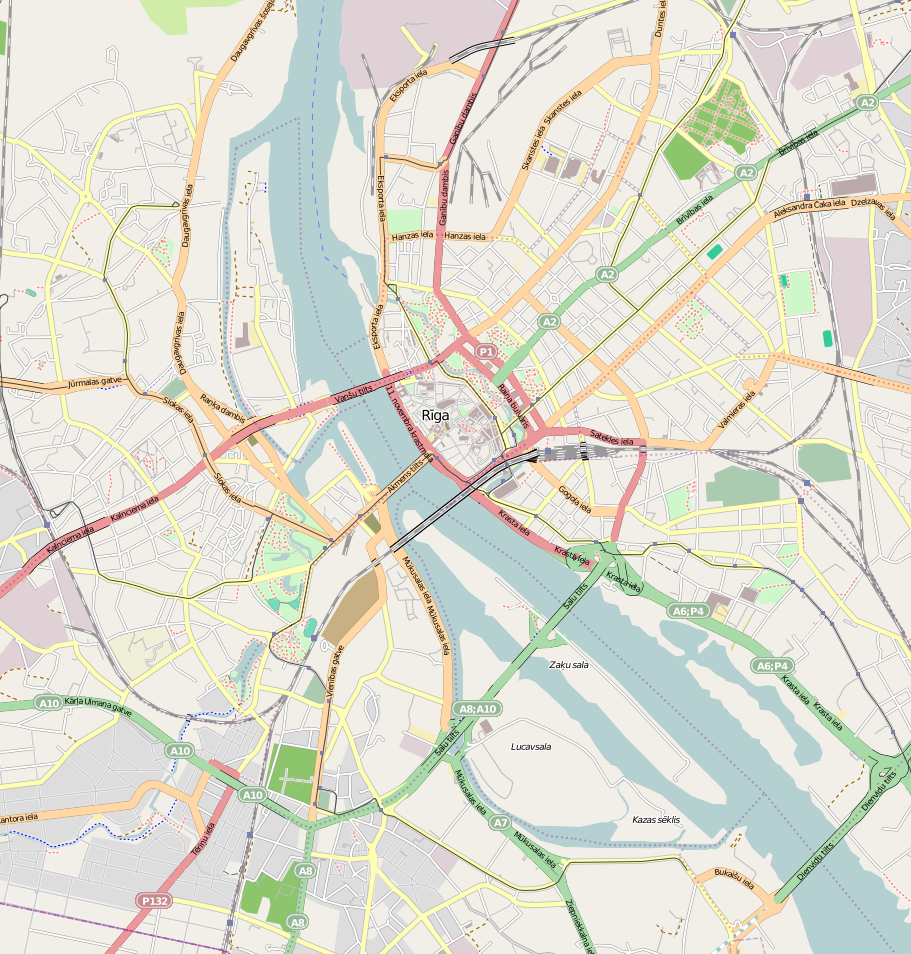
- Location within Riga
- 56°58′7.81″N 24°8′14.92″E
- Location: Riga
- Country: Latvia
- Denomination: Lutheran

Church of Christ (Latvian: Kristus Evaņģēliski luteriskā baznīca) is a Lutheran church in Riga, the capital of Latvia. It is a parish church of the Evangelical Lutheran Church of Latvia, under the episcopal authority of the Archbishop of Riga. The location where the church meets is situated at the address 1 Mēness Street.
