= Jaunciems Lutheran Church =

Church building in Riga, Latvia

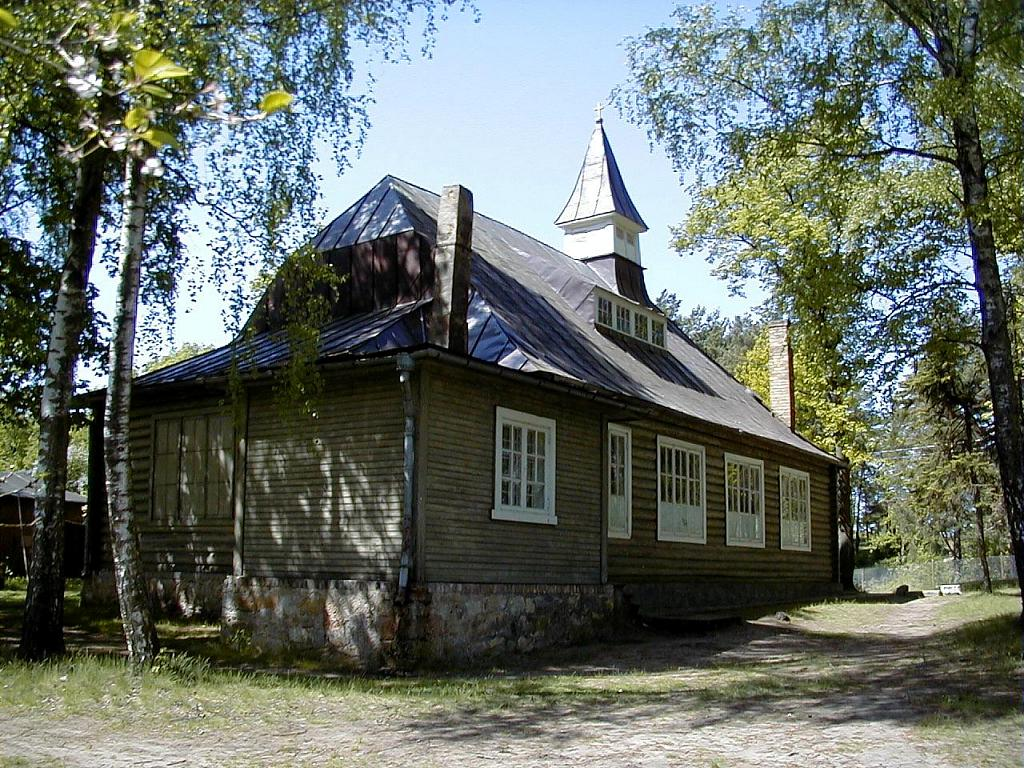
- Jaunciems Lutheran Church in 2002

- Location within Latvia Riga metropolitan
- 57°2′30.78″N 24°10′44.45″E
- Location: Riga
- Country: Latvia
- Denomination: Lutheran

Jaunciems Lutheran Church (Latvian: Jaunciema evaņģēliski luteriskā baznīca) is a Lutheran church in Riga, the capital of Latvia. It is a parish church of the Evangelical Lutheran Church of Latvia. The church is situated at the address 6/8 Jaunciema 5. šķērslīnija.

Church building was built in 1911-13 by the project of Baltic German architect Wilhelm Rossler. It is wooden building in national romantic style. It was reconstructed in 1930s. After Second world war church was closed and building transformed as apartment building. Lutheran parish regained building in early 1990s.
