= Bolderāja Lutheran Church =

Church building in Latvia

Coordinates: 57°02′02″N 24°02′16″E

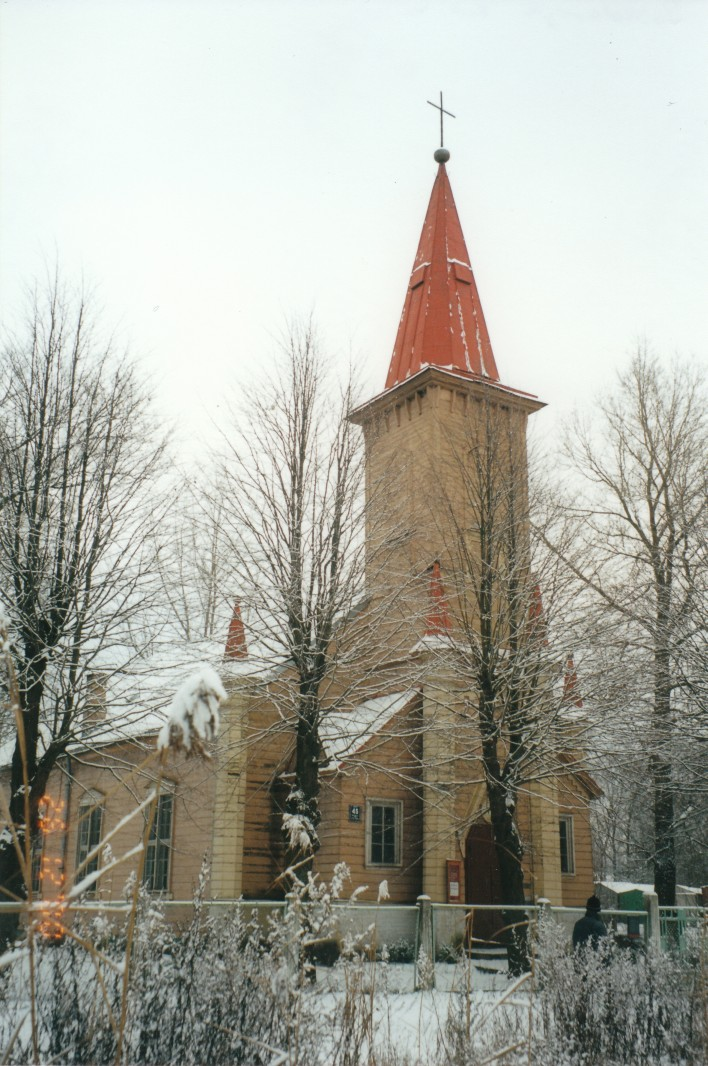
Bolderāja Lutheran Church

Bolderāja Lutheran Church (Latvian: Bolderājas evaņģēliski luteriskā baznīca) is a Lutheran church in Riga, the capital of Latvia. It is a parish church of the Evangelical Lutheran Church of Latvia. The building is situated at the address Lielā iela 45. The wooden church was built in 1875.
