= Ēriks Mesters =

The Most Reverend Ēriks Mesters
- Archbishop of Riga
- Church: Evangelical Lutheran Church of Latvia
- Archdiocese: Riga
- See: Riga
- Elected: 15 April 1986
- In office: 1986–1989
- Predecessor: Jānis Matulis
- Successor: Kārlis Gailītis

Orders
- Ordination: 8 June 1968
- Consecration: 24 August 1986 by Olof Sundby

Personal details
- Born: 20 December 1926 Kalnāji, Jelgava, Latvia
- Died: 8 November 2009 (aged 82) Riga, Latvia
- Occupation: Lutheran Archbishop

Ēriks Mesters (20 December 1926 – 8 November 2009) was a Latvian theologian and archbishop of the Evangelical Lutheran Church of Latvia and Archbishop of Riga from 1986 to 1989.

== Biography ==
Ēriks Mesters was a soldier of the Red Army during WWII. Between 1956 and 1959 he worked as a consultant for the National Economic Council of the Latvian SSR. From 1960 to 1967 he studied theology at the seminary of the Evangelical Lutheran Church of Latvia in Riga. On 8 June 1969 he was ordained a priest in Holy Trinity Lutheran Church, Riga, to which he had been a vicar since 1968. From 1969 to 1986 he was pastor of Holy Trinity Church and from 1972 to 1986 also of the parish of Dalbe. From 1980 he was a member of the Consistory of the Latvian Church.

Mesters was elected archbishop of Riga on 15 April 1986 during the extraordinary synod of the Latvian Evangelical Lutheran Church. He thus succeeded Jānis Matulis, who died in August 1985. On 24 August he was consecrated by Olof Sundby Archbishop emeritus of Uppsala in St. Gertrude New Church, Riga. From 1986 to 1989, Mesters taught ethics at the theological seminary in Riga.

Ēriks Mesters was known as a supporter of the existing Soviet order. In the turbulent eighties in the Baltic states, when young people from the three countries in particular called for independence, Mesters supported the Soviet government. Within the Consistory (administration) of the Latvian Church his attitude was not undisputed and this probably led to his retirement in 1989.

In 2005 a book about the history of the Latvian Church was published. In the years before he wrote some biographies of Lutheran archbishops. Mesters died at the age of 82 on 8 November 2009 in Riga.
