= Libraries of the University of Latvia =

Library in Riga, Latvia

The Library of the University of Latvia is the main study and research centre of the University of Latvia. It is also the largest library of institution of higher education in Latvia. The Library serves needs of students and staff of the University of Latvia. The users of the Library can access more than 1.7 million information resources in different scientific disciplines. Library provides qualitative, varied and contemporary services; electronic and printed resources; and united service in the Central library and all 11 branch libraries of the University of Latvia.

== History ==
The history of the Library of University of Latvia dates back to 1862 when the first higher education institution in the country - Riga Polytechnic, was founded. In 1919, the University of Latvia was founded on the basis of the Riga Polytechnical Institute. Initially, the faculty libraries were created, while the Central Library of the University of Latvia was established in 1920.

== Premises ==
The Kalpaka Boulevard Library was built in 1874 for the mayor of Riga Ludwig Wilhelm Kerkoviuss (1931-1904). The building was constructed by the first Latvian architect Janis Baumanis (1834–1891). J. Baumanis is the author of almost the third part of all buildings built in Boulevards in the centre of Riga. The first organizations to occupy the building were the City art gallery and Art promotional association back in 1879. It is known that in year 1925 an illegal automobile workshop was located at Kalpaka Blvd. 4. In 1934 different lectures and sessions of the Latvian cancer contain association were organized by Museum of hygiene. Also in the thirties the Health promotion office was located in the building. In 1936 the third floor of the building was rented out to student corporation "Imeria". The Library moved in 1941 when a decision to transfer the Central library of the Library of the University of Latvia from its previous location in the university's main building in Raina Blvd 19 was made. However Library was forced to leave the building in 1942 by the ruling political power. In 1957 the Library retrieved the premises in Kalpaka Blvd. 4 and the Central library of the University of Latvia has been located in Kalpaka Blvd. 4 since then. The libraries of the 11 faculties are located in the buildings of the faculties.

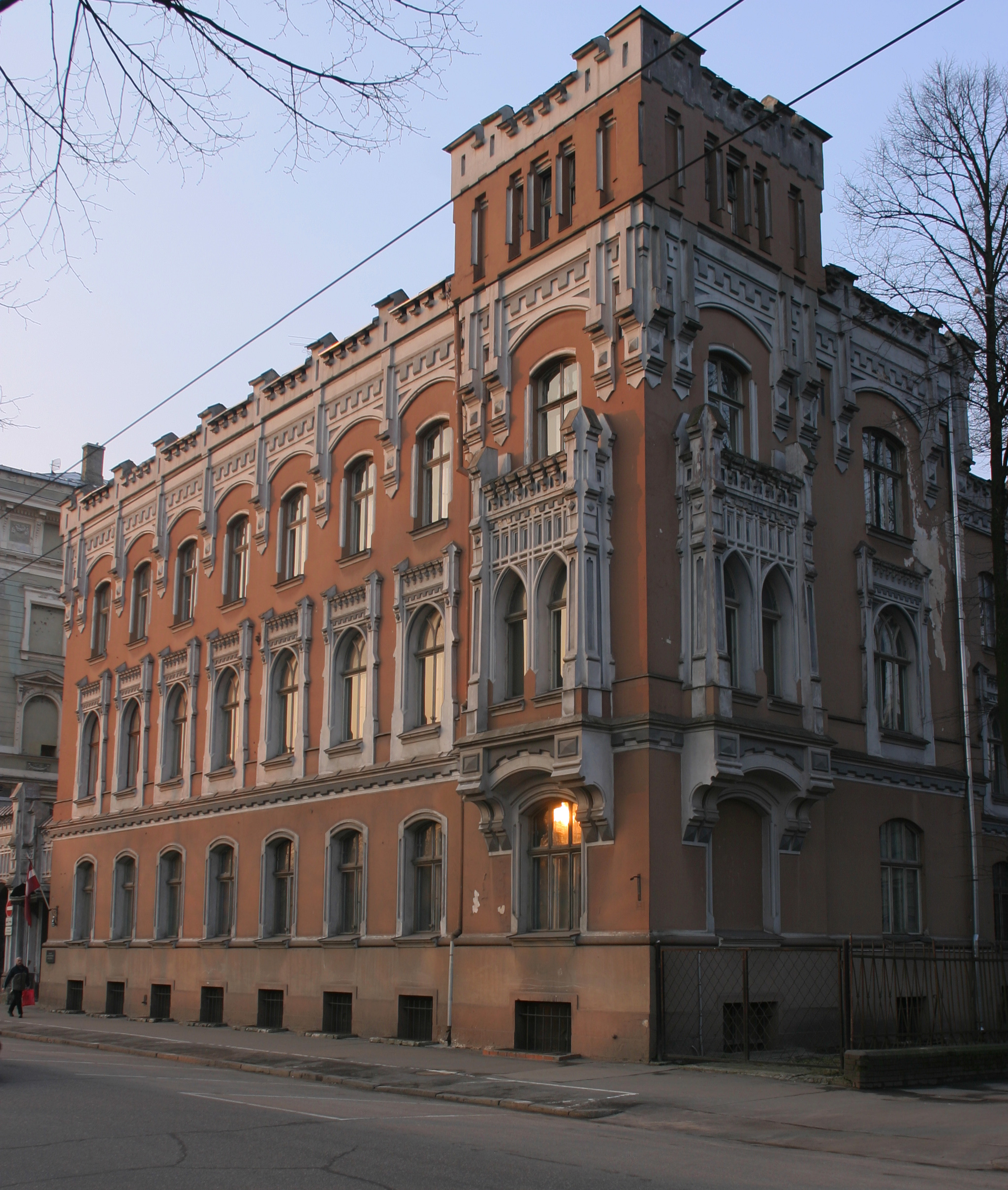
Building of the library

Some important architectural elements like windows with lancet arch, the original oaken stairs, that was renovated in year 2000, the original doors and interesting plafonds made in 1890 are still visible at Kalpaka Boulevard 4.

== Central library ==
The Central library of the Library of University of Latvia is multidisciplinary information resources collection, that contains broad collection of publications from Latvia, Scientific Papers from University of Latvia, dissertations from University of Latvia since the early days of the university until nowadays, continued publications in all scientific disciplines, periodicals, fiction etc.

== Branch libraries ==
- Library of Biology
- Library of Chemical Sciences
- Library of Economics
- Library of Education and Psychology
- Library of Geography and Earth Sciences
- Library of History and Philosophy Sciences
- Library of Medicine
- Library of the Faculty of Physics and Mathematics
- Library of the Faculty of Social Sciences
- Library of the Humanities
- Multidisciplinary Library: Computer Science, Law and Theology

== Collection ==
Collection comprises over 2 million units and is continually expanded. The Library offers books, periodicals, audiovisual materials, unpublished documents, electronic publications and other resources in various fields of science in Latvian and foreign languages. The Library has both open and closed stock facilities with all of the materials available to every user of the Library. There is a wide range of rich and qualitative electronic resources available. Those include e-books, e-journals, databases of reference, juridical information, dissertations and other kind of e-resources. Library provides access to more than 40 subscribed databases with over 100 000 e-resources in different fields of science available at the premises. Faculty and students of the university may access the resources remotely.

=== Special collections ===
The Library is proud of several collections of Rare Editions and Manuscripts that include fragments of medieval manuscripts, manuscripts of prominent figures of Latvian culture, reproductions and books from the 13th century up until our day. The Library has received several collections donated by outstanding world scientists: Embriks Strands, Ernests Felsbergs, Pēteris Šmits, Helmut Winter, Samuels Knohs and others.

== Local databases ==
Access to aggregate information of the results of academic and research activities at the University of Latvia is available via bibliographic databases created at the Library: University of Latvia research publications and history; University of Latvia graduation thesis and a database of dissertations elaborated and defended at the university. Resources may be accessed via the union catalogue online and the card catalogue located at the Central Library.

== See also ==
- List of libraries in Latvia
