= Gustavs Tūrs =

Latvian cleric

The Most Reverend Gustavs Turss (Tūrs)
- Archbishop of Riga
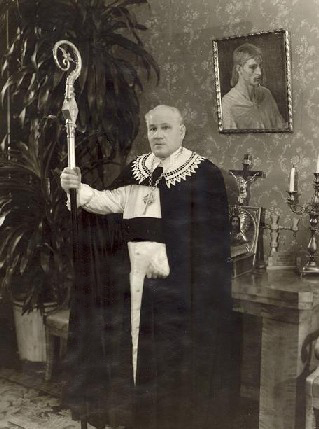
- Church: Evangelical Lutheran Church of Latvia
- Archdiocese: Riga
- See: Riga
- Elected: 14 March 1948
- In office: 1948–1968
- Predecessor: Teodors Grīnbergs
- Successor: Jānis Matulis

Orders
- Ordination: 20 June 1920

Personal details
- Born: 24 May 1890 Prauliena Parish, Russian Empire
- Died: 16 March 1973 (aged 82) Riga, Latvian SSR
- Buried: Forest Cemetery, Riga
- Parents: Gustavs Turss; Anna Tursa
- Occupation: Archbishop

Gustavs Tūrs (24 May 1890 — 16 March 1973) was a Latvian prelate of the Evangelical Lutheran Church of Latvia and Archbishop of Riga from 1948 to 1968.

== Biography ==
He was born on 24 May 1890 to Gustavs and Anna Tursa in Prauliena Parish "Silnieki". The family had eight children. He studied at the Lazdon Parish School (Gustavs'kola), at the Aleksander Boys' Gymnasium and St. Petersburg Alexei Gymnasium (1907-1910). He studied jurisprudence and later theology from 1910 to 1918 at the University of Tartu.

On 20 June 1920 he was ordained to the priesthood in St James' Church in Riga, when it was still a Lutheran church. For a short time he served as a pastor in Latgale in the parishes of Sīķele, Borne, Kalupe, Preiļi and Krāslava. Since 1921 he has served as a teacher in Bauska and as a pastor in the Bauska parish, having been there for 24 years. He also served in areas surrounding Bauska such as Cod, Mezotne and Budberga. During and after World War II he was a pastor of St. John's Church, Riga and of Alūksne, Sātu and Zemītes.

On 14 March 1948 he was elected Archbishop of the LELB however he was never consecrated due to ongoing political issues. In 1959, Leipzig University's Faculty of Theology bestowed him with an honorary doctorate. On 23 March 1968, at the 11th General Synod, Tūrs resigned from his post as Archbishop of Riga and Primate of the Church of Latvia. He died on 16 March 1973 in Riga. He was buried on 24 March 1973 in Forest Cemetery, Riga.
