= List of libraries in Latvia =

This is a list of libraries in Latvia.

== Libraries ==
- Ādžūni Library
- Baloži Library
- Bauska Central Library
- Gostiņi Library
- Jelgava City Library
- Libraries of the University of Latvia
  - Kalpaka Boulevard Library, Riga
- Library of the Saeima of Latvia (parliamentary library)
- Liepaja Central Scientific Library
- Līvāni Central Library
- Ludza Town Library
- National Library of Latvia
- Nītaures Parish Library
- Popes Library
- Pūre Parish Library
- Pureņi Parish Library
- Riga Central Library
- Riga Stradiņš University Library
- Riga Technical University Scientific Library
- Staļģene Library
- Turība Business School Library
- Ugāle Library
- Usma Library
- Užava Library
- Valle Library
- Vilkene Parish Library
- Ziras Library
- Zlēkas Library

== See also ==
- Latvian literature
- Mass media in Latvia

in other languages

- Copyright in Latvia (in Russian)
- Libraries in Sigulda (in Latvian)
- Library Association of Latvia (in Latvian)
- National Archives of Latvia (in Latvian)
- Latvian State Historical Archives (in Latvian)
