= Holy Trinity Lutheran Church, Riga =

Church building in Riga, Latvia

Holy Trinity Lutheran Church
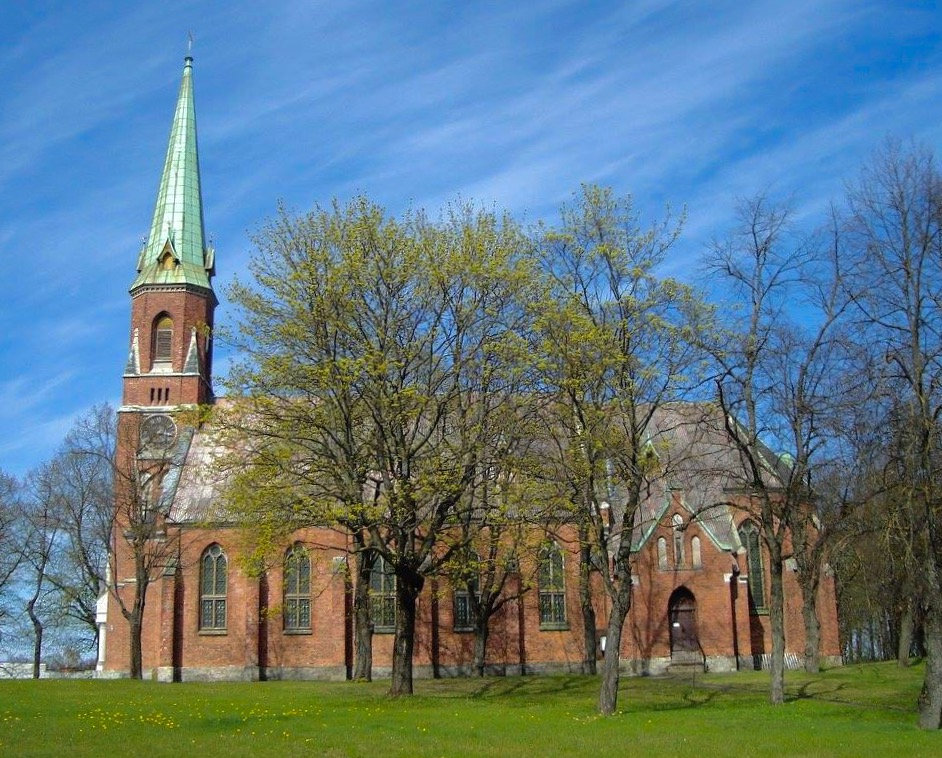

- Location within Latvia Riga metropolitan
- 56°59′52.23″N 24°7′29.79″E
- Location: Riga
- Country: Latvia
- Denomination: Lutheran

Holy Trinity Lutheran Church (Latvian: Svētās Trīsvienības evaņģēliski luteriskā baznīca) is a Lutheran church in Riga, the capital of Latvia. It is a parish church of the Evangelical Lutheran Church of Latvia. The church is situated at the address 10 Sarkandaugavas Street.
