= Martin Luther Cathedral, Daugavpils =

Church building in Daugavpils, Latvia

Coordinates: 55°52′15″N 26°32′27″E

Daugavpils Martin Luther Cathedral
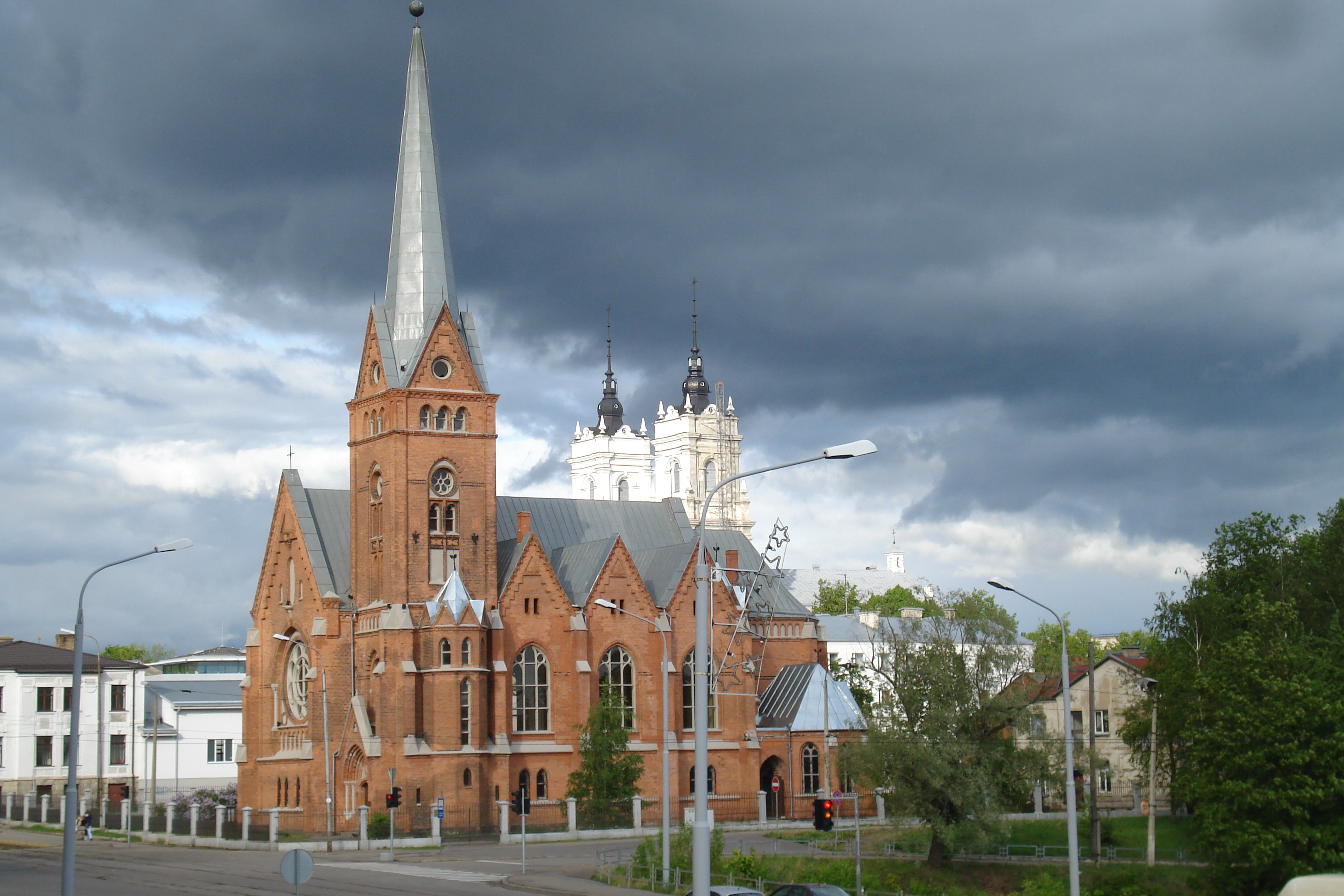
- Location: Daugavpils
- Country: Latvia
- Denomination: Lutheran

Architecture
- Architect: Wilhelm Neumann
- Style: Neo Gothic
- Years built: 1893

Administration
- Diocese: Daugavpils

The Evangelical Lutheran Church of Martin Luther (Latvian: Mārtiņa Lutera evaņģēliski luteriskā baznīca) or Martin Luther Cathedral is an Evangelical Lutheran cathedral in Daugavpils, Latvia.

== Design ==
The cathedral was designed by Wilhelm Neumann, one of the most influential architects in the current landscape of Daugavpils. It is built in a brick neogothic style and was completed in 1893.

== Diocese of Daugavpils ==
The cathedral is the seat of the Lutheran Bishop of Daugavpils in the Evangelical Lutheran Church of Latvia. The current bishop is Einārs Alpe, born 11 November 1963, who was ordained in the Lutheran Church in 1991, and was consecrated and enthroned as Bishop of Daugavpils on 13 October 2007.

== Gallery ==
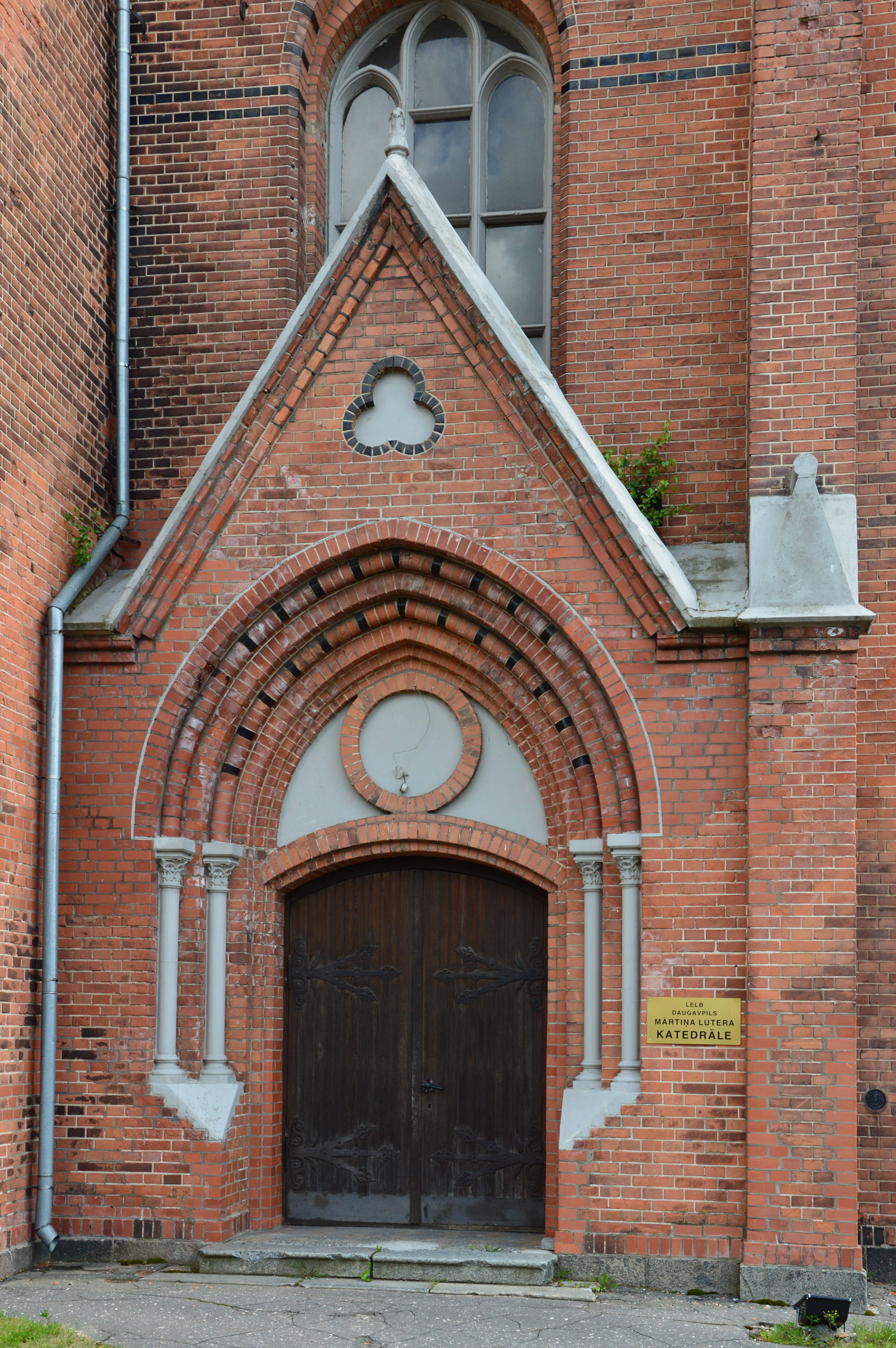
Cathedral doors

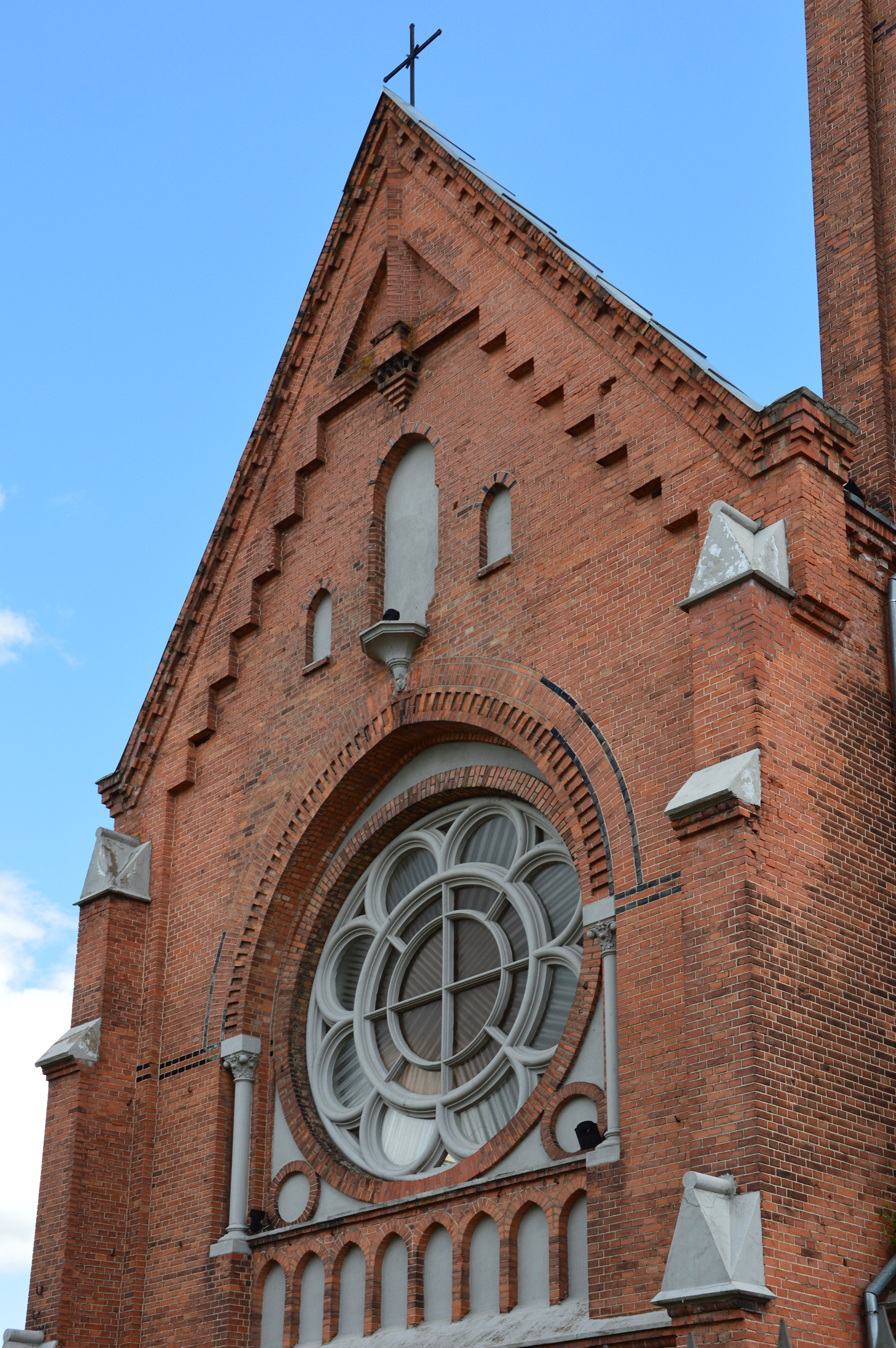

== See also ==
- Ss. Boris and Gleb Cathedral, Daugavpils
