= University of Latvia =

University in Riga, Latvia

Coordinates: 56°57′02″N 24°06′58″E

- Latvijas Universitāte
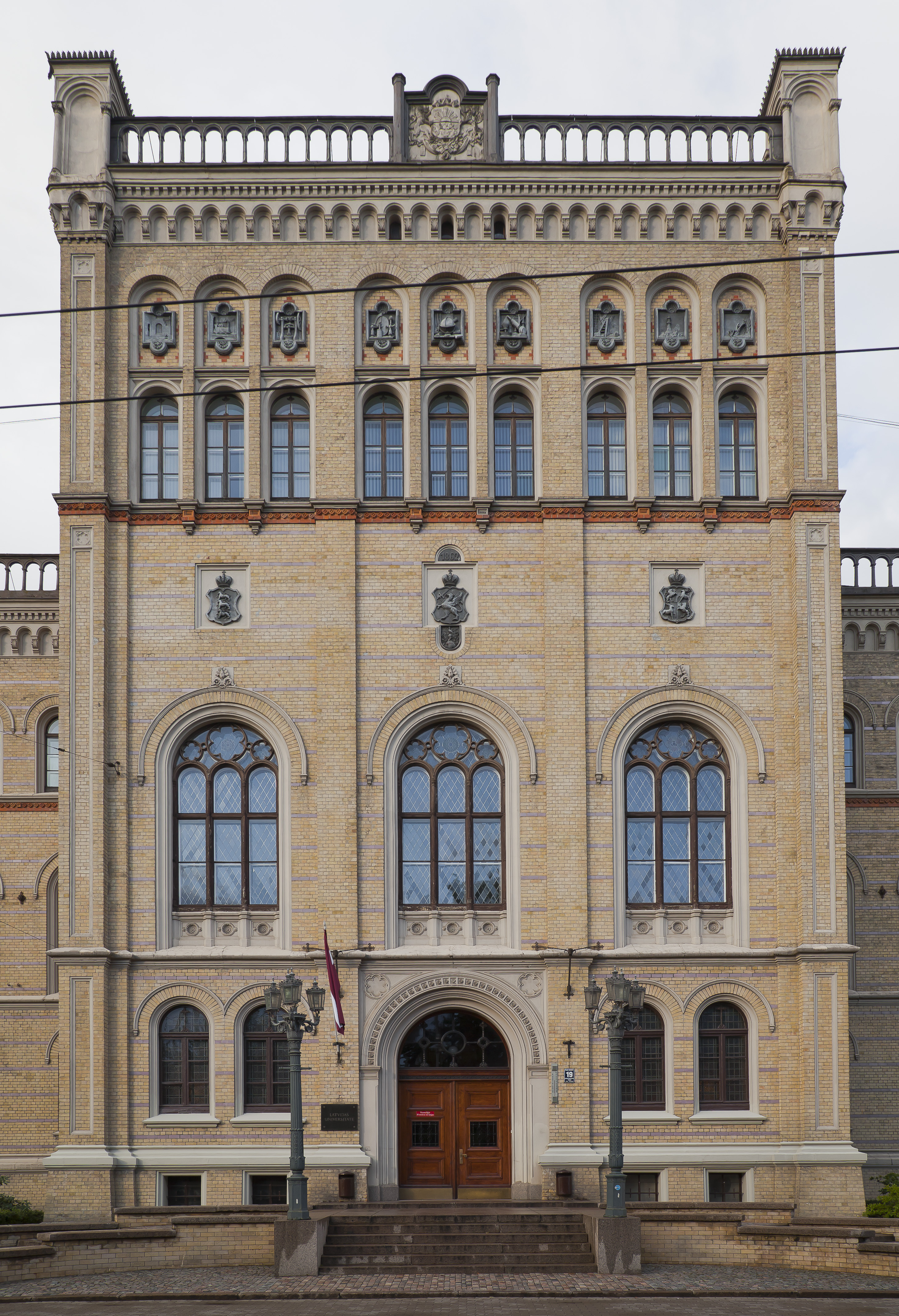
- Main entrance on Rainis Boulevard
- Latin: Universitas Latviensis
- Motto: Scientiae et patriae (For science and fatherland)
- Type: Public
- Established: 1919; 107 years ago
- Affiliations: Campus Europae, Utrecht Network, EUA, UNICA, IAU, AUF, Talloires, Educause
- Rector: Gundars Bērziņš
- Students: 15,200 (2018)
- Undergraduates: 9,680 (2014)
- Postgraduates: 3,536 (2014)
- Doctoral students: 118 (2018)
- Location: Raiņa bulvāris 19, Riga, Latvia
- Website: www.lu.lv

University rankings

Global – Overall
- QS World: 801–850 (2024)
- THE World: 1001–1200 (2026)
- USNWR Global: =1022 (2023)

University of Latvia (Latvian: Latvijas Universitāte, shortened LU) is a public research university located in Riga, Latvia. The university was established in 1919. It is one of the largest and most prestigious higher education institutions in the Baltic States.

== History ==
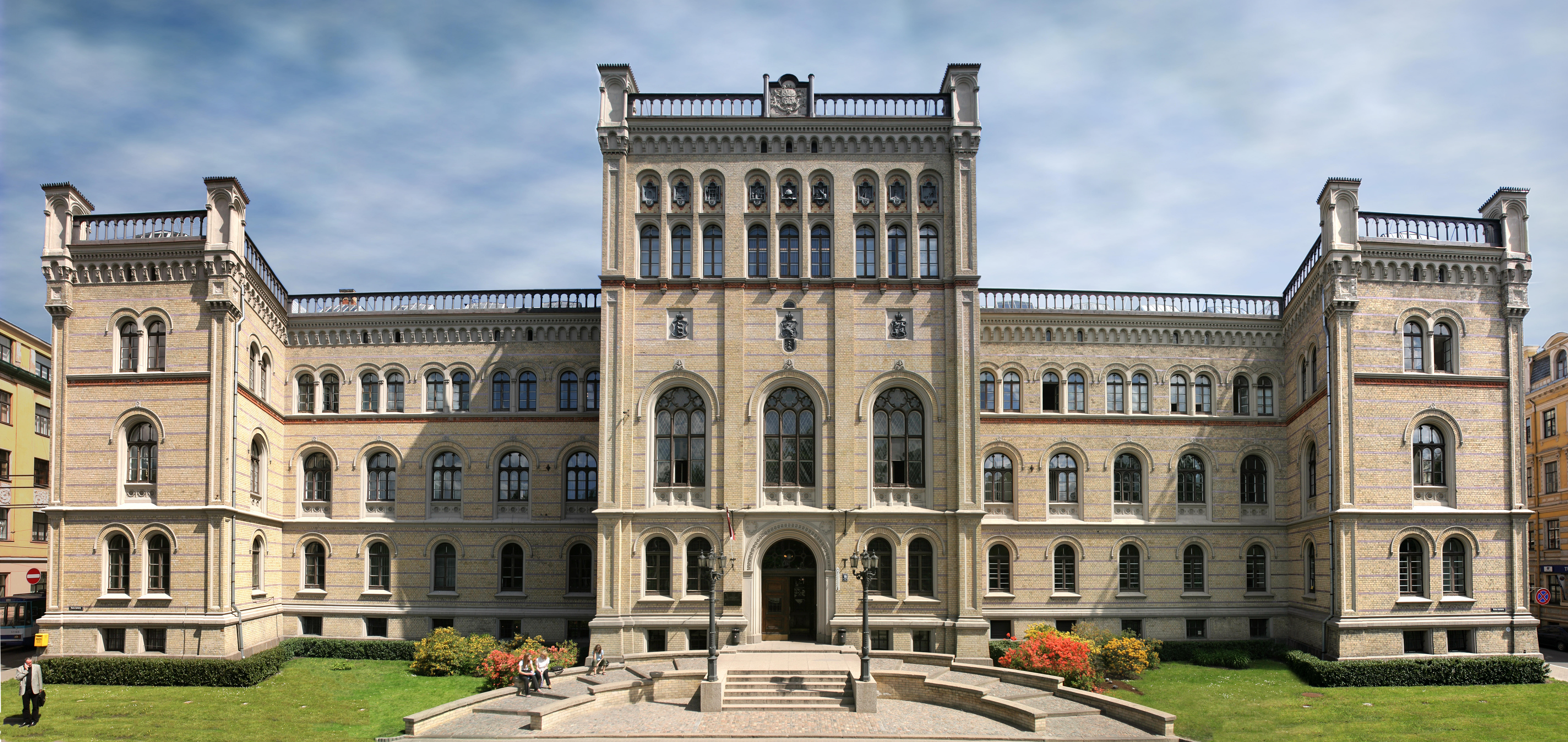
Central building, originally constructed for the Riga Polytechnic.

The University of Latvia, initially named as the Higher School of Latvia (Latvian: Latvijas Augstskola) was founded on September 28, 1919, on the basis of the former Riga Polytechnic (founded in 1862). The first rector of the university was chemist Paul Walden. In 1923, the school received its current name with the approval of its constitution, the University of Latvia (Universitas Latviensis).

In the period between 1919 and 1940, the University of Latvia was the main centre of higher education, science and culture in the Republic of Latvia. The former building of the Riga Polytechnic on Raiņa bulvāris 19 serves as the university's main building. In the pre-WWII years, it was possible to gain higher academic education not only at the University of Latvia but also at the Latvian State Conservatory and Academy of Arts.

With the beginning of the Soviet occupation, the university was renamed as the Latvian State University (LVU, Latvian: Latvijas Valsts Universitāte) from 1940 to 1941 and from 1944/1945 to 1958. Under the Nazi occupation, from 1942 to 1944/1945 its name was the University of Riga (Latvian: Rīgas Universitāte). After World War II, over time the Latvian University of Agriculture, Riga Stradiņš University, and Riga Technical University separated from the University of Latvia and became well-known centres of education and research in their own right. In 1958, the university was renamed as the Pēteris Stučka Latvian State University (Latvian: Pētera Stučkas Latvijas Valsts Universitāte), which was its official name until 1990.

With Latvia regaining independence, the Supreme Council of the Republic of Latvia reconfirmed the Constitution of the University of Latvia on September 18, 1991. It stated that the institution is "a state establishment of academic education, science and culture which serves the needs of Latvia and its people". Alongside the Constitution (the Satversme of the UoL), the flag, the anthem, the university's emblem, the rector's chain, and the official garments for the rector, vice-rector and deans were re-adopted as attributes of the University of Latvia.

The EuroFaculty, created by the CBSS to support reforms at the universities in Tartu, Riga, and Vilnius, was organized with its headquarters at the University of Latvia from 1993 to 2005. The Riga Teacher Training and Educational Management Academy was merged into the university in 2017.

In recent years, the university has often faced serious reputational problems. Several professors have been caught plagiarizing. The current rector and his former deputy have been charged with serious crimes. A criminal investigation into the embezzlement of European funds in the project led by the former chairman of the Constituent Assembly of the university is underway.

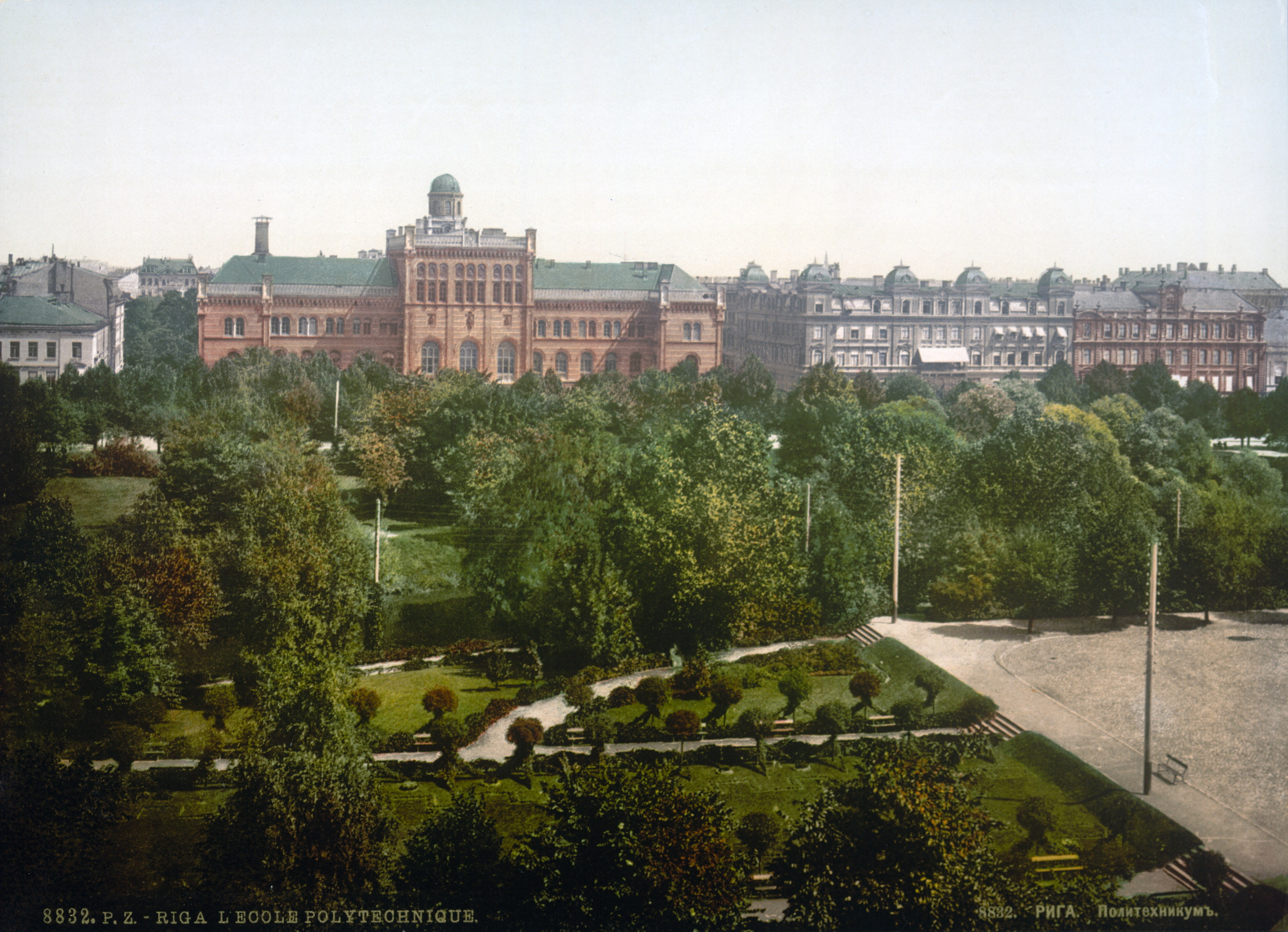
University of Latvia main building in the 1890s

== Enrollment ==
The University of Latvia offers undergraduate, graduate, and doctoral levels of study and in October 2014 more than 14,000 students, including Ph.D. and exchange students, had enrolled in various study programs. Almost one third of them studied in business and economics related programs.

== Organisation ==
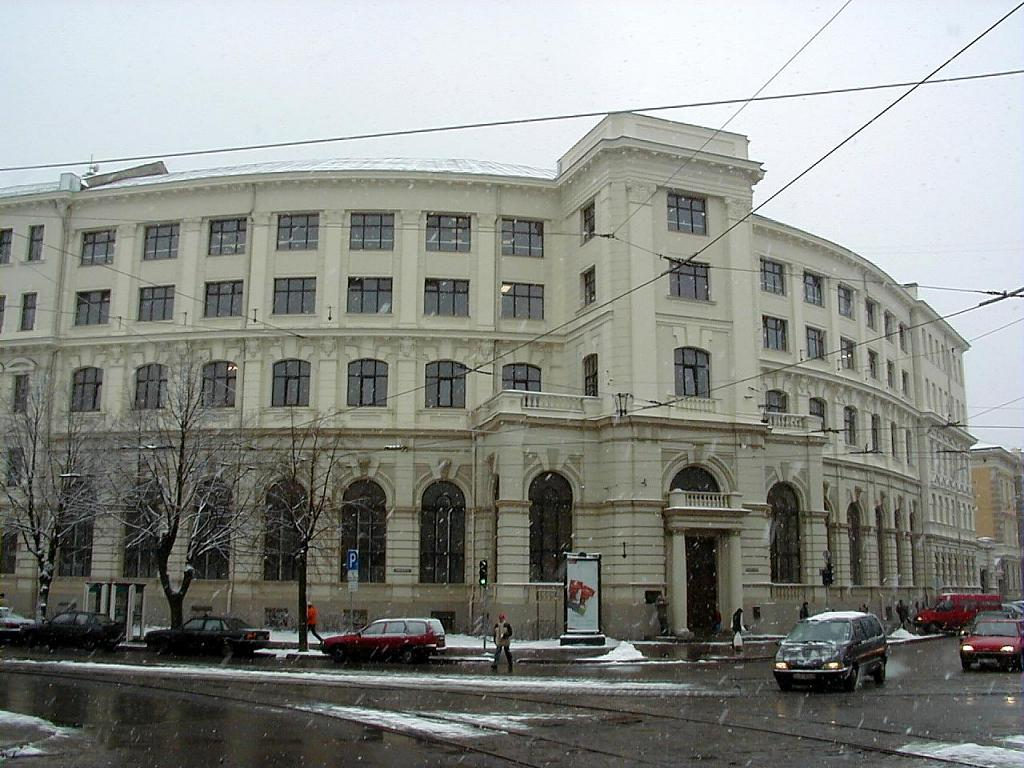
Faculty of Economics and Social Sciences

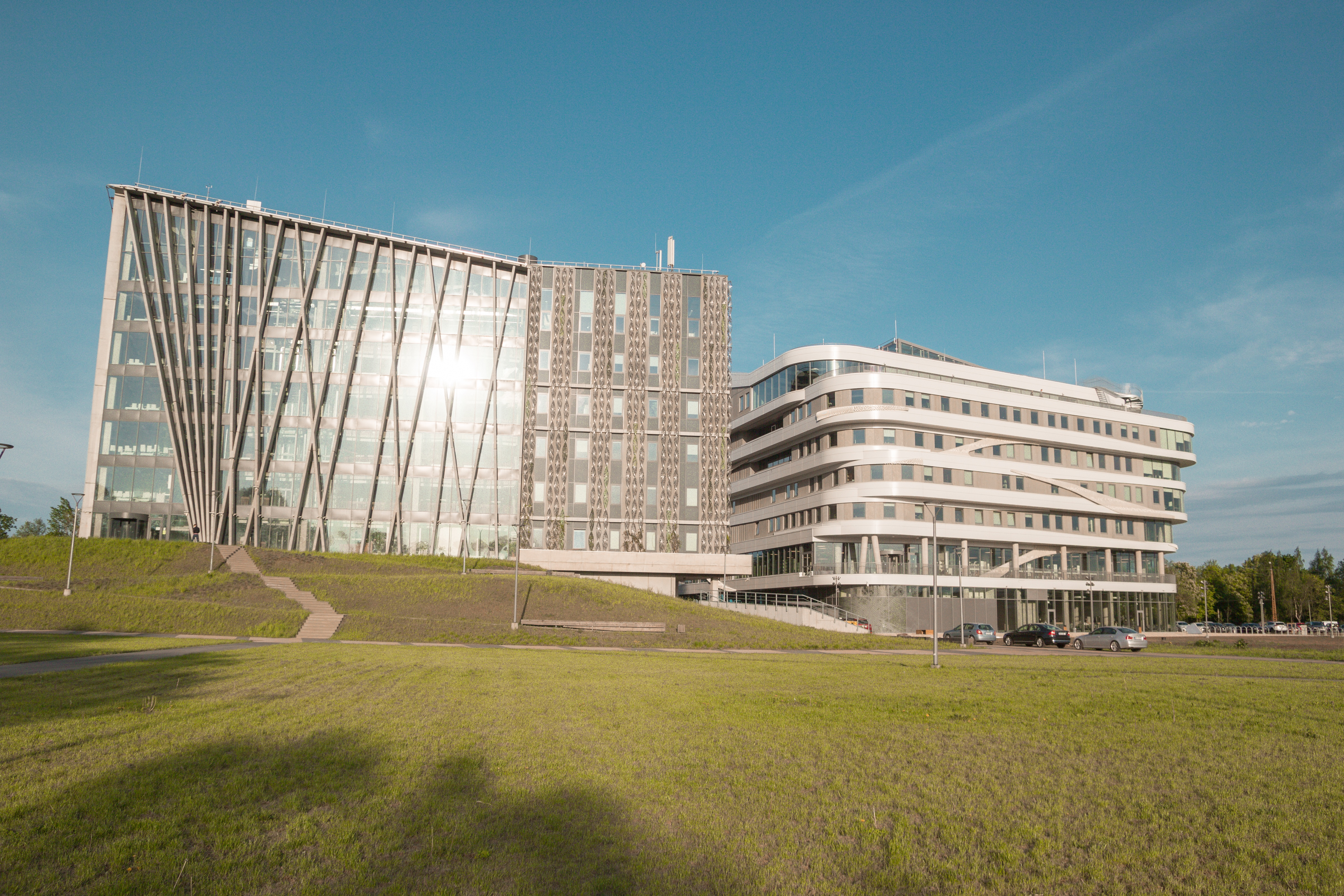
The new campus of the University of Latvia in Torņakalns neighbourhood (Jelgavas iela, Riga). The House of Nature (left) and the House of Science (built 2019). The House of Writing is currently under construction.

The university consists of 6 faculties:

- Faculty of Medicine and Life Sciences

- Department of Plant Physiology
- Department of Botany and Ecology
- Department of Human and Animal Physiology
- Department of Hydrobiology
- Department of Microbiology and Biotechnology
- Department of Molecular Biology
- Department of Zoology and Animal Ecology
- Department of Inorganic Chemistry
- Department of Analytical Chemistry
- Department of Organic Chemistry
- Department of Physical Chemistry
- Centre of Food Chemistry
- Centre of Chemistry Didactics
- Centre of Health Management and Informatics
- Department of Anatomy and Histology
- Centre of Experimental Surgery
- Department of Pharmacology
- Department of Internal Medicine
- Department of Medical Biochemistry
- Department of Medical Pedagogy, Ethics and History
- Department of Dentistry
- Department of Oncology
- Department of Surgery
- Department of Pathology
- Department of Pediatrics
- Centre of Social Pediatrics

- Faculty of Science and Technology

- Department of Optometry and Vision Science
- Department of Mathematics
- Department of Physics
- Laser Centre of the University of Latvia
- Extramural Mathematics School of A. Liepa
- Chair of Computer Science
- Chair of Programming
- Chair of Mathematical Foundations of Computer Science
- Chair of Informatics Lifelong Learning
- Methodological Laboratory of Computer Science Studies
- Methodological Laboratory of Computing Studies – the Linux Centre
- Department of Geography
- Department of Geology
- Department of Environmental Science

- Faculty of Economics and Social Sciences

- Department of Global Economics Interdisciplinary Studies
- Department of Economics
- Department of Finance and Accounting
- Department of Management Sciences
- Department of Information and Library Studies
- Department of Communications Studies
- Department of Political Science
- Department of Sociology
- Center for the Cognitive Sciences and Semantics

- Faculty of Education Sciences and Psychology

- Department of Education Sciences
- Department of Pedagogy
- Department of Psychology
- Department of Teacher Training
- Sports Centre
- Centre of Adult Pedagogical Education

- Faculty of Law

- Centre for Further Legal Education and Professional Improvement
- Chair of Civil Law
- Chair of Constitutional Law
- Chair of Criminal Law
- Chair of International and European law
- Chair of Legal Theory and History
- Legal Clinic of the Faculty of Law

- Faculty of Humanities

- Department of Asian Studies
- Department of Contrastive Linguistics, Translation and Interpreting
- Department of Classical Philology and Anthropology Studies
- Department of English Studies
- Department of Germanic Studies
- Department of Latvian and Baltic Studies
- Department of Romance Studies
- Department of Russian and Slavonic Studies
- Department of History and Archaeology
- Department of Philosophy and Ethics
- Department of Systematic and Practical Theology
- Department of Church History and History of Religions
- Department of Biblical Theology

In addition to the university's various faculties, the Student Council and its medical wing, the Riga Medical College (Rīgas Medicīnas koledža), the University of Latvia offers most of the resources traditionally associated with accredited universities, including several libraries, research facilities, study centres, a language school, and a career centre. The faculties are currently undergoing restructuring and will be reduced in number.

== Institute of Mathematics and Computer Science ==
The Institute of Mathematics and Computer Science of the University of Latvia (Latvian: Matemātikas un informātikas institūts, IMCS) was founded in 1959 as a computer research centre, now consisting of about 200 researchers, assistants, engineers, and software developers.

== Institute of Geodesy and Geoinformatics ==
The Institute of Geodesy and Geoinformatics (GGI) of the University of Latvia (Latvian: Ģeodēzijas un ģeoinformātikas institūts) is the reestablishment of the Institute of Geodesy since 1994. The researchers of the Institute of Geodesy (1924-1944) worked successfully on the research and education in many advanced topics of that time – development and adjustment of National geodetic networks, photogrammetry, studies of vertical Earth movement and research in gravimetric and magnetic measurements. Currently, the research areas are developed in satellite geodesy and geoinformatics. The main topic is the development of satellite laser ranging systems (SLR), both the hardware and control software. Two SLR prototypes were developed until 2010 by spending low expenditures. The third most improved model is under development now. All the knowledge and experience of the staff gained since 1975 is applied. Younger colleagues are involved in the development process.

The prototype digital zenith camera for studies of vertical deflection has been developed recently. The test results reach a precision of 0.1 arc second which is very promising for the improvement of the quality of the National model of Latvia gravity field modelling. The recent version of the National gravity field developed at the Institute of Geodesy and Geoinformatics has achieved a precision of about 2 cm which is much higher than the previous model (7–8 cm) used in Latvia. The high precision gravity field model is very important for practice. It gives the possibility to achieve correspondingly high precision of normal height determination using Global Navigation Satellite Systems (GNSS) in geodetic measurements.

There has been achieved at the Institute of Geodesy and Geoinformatics the high precision results in studies of vertical and horizontal motion of the Earth in Latvia by carrying out the analysis of the 7 year GNSS observations at the LatPos and EUPOS-RIGA permanent station networks.

There are developed the GIS database for Latvia and cities of Latvia, developed digital terrain models.

== Amateur Art Activities ==
The university has a number of amateur choirs, orchestras and dance groups, as well as a student theatre. University's mixed choir Juventus is the oldest university choir in Latvia. Minjona is a women's choir based at the University of Latvia.

== People ==
=== Notable professors and lecturers ===
- Andris Ambainis, computer scientist
- Mārcis Auziņš, physicist
- Kārlis Balodis, economist
- Konstantīns Čakste, legal theorist and LCP Chairman, son of Latvian president Jānis Čakste
- Jānis Endzelīns, linguist
- Teodors Grīnbergs, was a professor and Latvian prelate of the Evangelical Lutheran Church of Latvia and its first archbishop from 1932. He was forcibly taken into exile in Germany in 1944. He continued to serve as archbishop of the Evangelical Lutheran Church of Latvia in exile
- Karlis Kaufmanis, astronomer
- Augusts Kirhenšteins, microbiologist
- Eižens Laube, architect
- Jānis Maizītis, lawyer and second prosecutor general of Latvia
- Valdis Muktupāvels, ethnomusicologist and doctor of art criticism
- Velta Ruke-Dravina linguist, folklorist

=== Notable alumni ===
- Māris Čaklais, Latvian poet
- Valdis Dombrovskis, Latvian politician, European Commissioner for Economic and Monetary Affairs and the Euro, former prime minister of Latvia
- Klāvs Elsbergs, Latvian poet
- Ivars Godmanis, Latvian politician, former prime minister of Latvia, MeP
- Uldis Ģērmanis, Latvian historian and writer
- Rinalds Grants, archbishop of the Evangelical Lutheran Church of Latvia
- Ivars Kalviņš, Latvian chemist, has worked on the foundation of mildronate
- Valdemārs Klētnieks, Latvian writer and national Scout Commissioner
- Guntars Krasts, Latvian politician, former prime minister of Latvia, MeP
- Hugo Teodors Krūmiņš, Latvian playwright and poet
- Kirovs Lipmans, Latvian business person and ice hockey executive
- Zenta Mauriņa, Latvian writer
- George Nagobads, Latvian-born American physician
- Artis Pabriks, Latvian politician, former Latvian minister of foreign affairs
- Andris Piebalgs, Latvian politician and diplomat, former European Commissioner for Energy
- Ilmārs Poikāns, Latvian AI researcher, hacker
- Einars Repše, Latvian politician, former prime minister of Latvia
- Eliyahu Rips, Israeli mathematician
- Alfred Rosenberg, race theorist and an influential ideologue of the Nazi Party.
- Aminata Savadogo, Latvian singer, songwriter, finalist in Eurovision Song Contest 2015
- Evika Siliņa, Prime Minister of Latvia
- Knuts Skujenieks, Latvian poet, journalist
- Mikhail Tal, Soviet-Latvian chess grandmaster and eighth World Chess Champion, nicknamed "The Magician from Riga"
- Daina Taimiņa, Latvian mathematician
- Kristīne Ulberga, novelist, winner of the Raimonds Gerkens Prize.
- Guntis Ulmanis, Latvian politician, former president of Latvia
- Jānis Vanags, archbishop of the Evangelical Lutheran Church of Latvia
- Raimonds Vējonis, the 9th president of Latvia
- Lato Lapsa, publicist, journalist and anti-corruption activist
- Antonija Vilcāne, Latvian medieval archaeologist

== See also ==
- Libraries of the University of Latvia
- List of universities in Latvia
- Utrecht Network
- List of modern universities in Europe (1801–1945)
- Kalpaka Boulevard Library
