= Jānis Vanags =

Latvian Lutheran bishop (born 1958)

The Most Reverend Jānis Vanags
- Archbishop of Riga
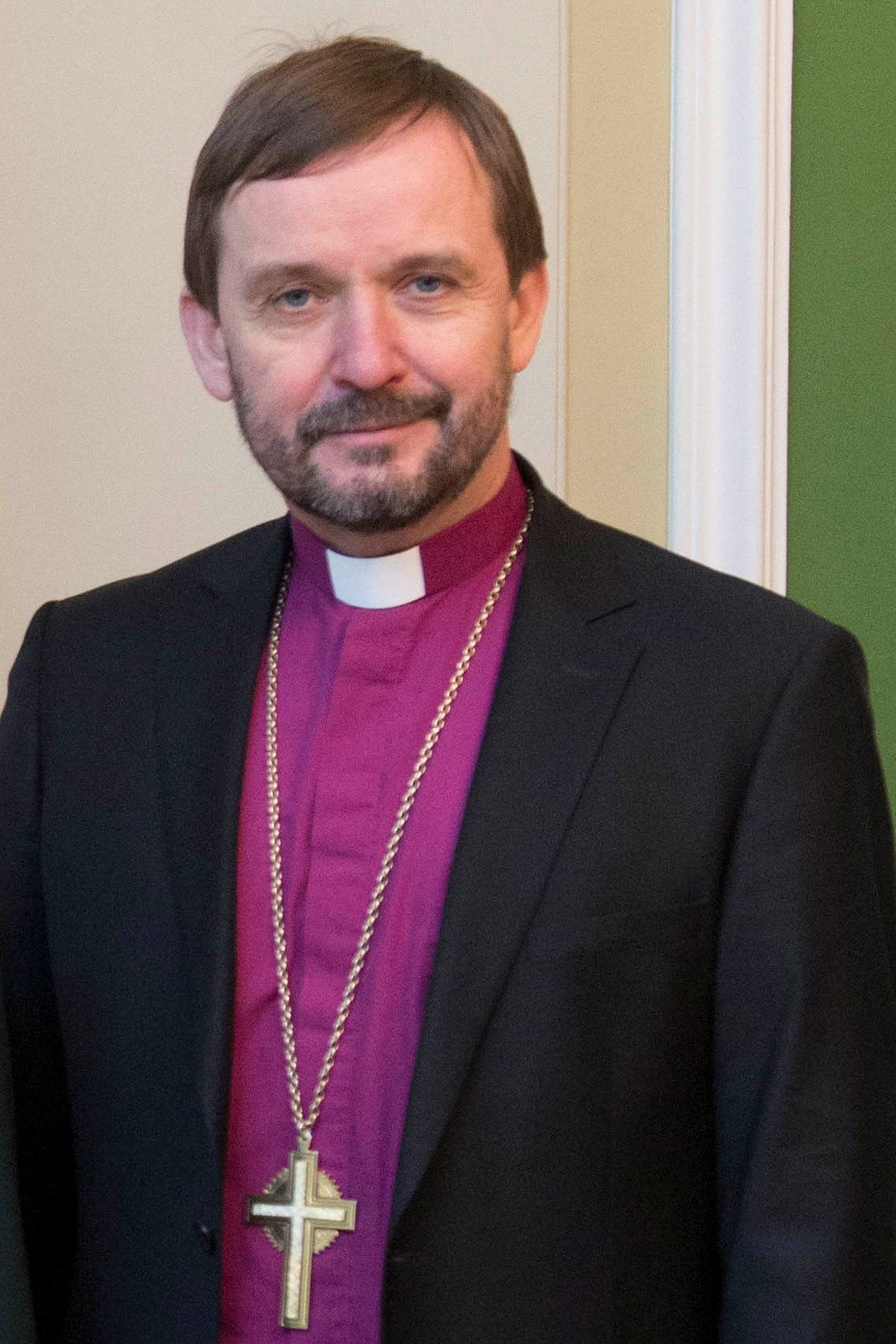
- Vanags in 2015
- Church: Evangelical Lutheran Church of Latvia
- Archdiocese: Riga
- See: Riga
- Elected: 26 January 1993
- In office: 1993-2025
- Predecessor: Kārlis Gailītis
- Successor: Rinalds Grants

Orders
- Ordination: 1 December 1985
- Consecration: 29 August 1993 by Henrik Svenungsson

Personal details
- Born: 25 May 1958 (age 68) Liepāja, Latvian SSR
- Spouse: Baiba Vanaga
- Children: 3
- Occupation: Lutheran bishop

Jānis Vanags (born 25 May 1958) is a Latvian retired Lutheran bishop. He was Archbishop of Riga in the Evangelical Lutheran Church of Latvia from 1993 until his retirement in 2025.

Vanags is seen as conservative on theological or moral issues and opposes women's ordination. He also opposes abortion and euthanasia, and encourages homosexual people to be chaste. He presided over the agreement of fellowship with the Lutheran Church–Missouri Synod of the United States.

== Background and education ==
Vanags studied at Liepaja 5th High School (1965–1976), the Latvian State University Chemistry Department (1976–1982), and the Lutheran Theological Seminar (1984–1989). He worked as a chemistry teacher in Riga Vilis Lacis 31st High School (1982–1985).

== Religious career ==
Vanags was ordained as a pastor in 1985. He was appointed by the synod to lead the Evangelical Lutheran Church of Latvia in 1993, following the death of Kārlis Gailītis, the previous archbishop, in a car crash. He was consecrated to the episcopate by the Lutheran Bishop of Stockholm, Henrik Svenungsson, on 29 August 1993, bringing the Swedish line of apostolic succession to the Evangelical Lutheran Church of Latvia.

Lutheranism is the leading religious tradition in Latvia, with a quarter of the country's 2.4 million population counted by the church as active members. Vanags has returned to the historic practice of the Lutheran Church by refusing to ordain women since his appointment in 1993. The ordination of women was formally banned by the synod in 2016.

He retired on 30 August 2025 during a service in Riga Cathedral where he laid his crozier and pectoral cross on the altar of the cathedral.

== Homosexuality controversy ==
Vanags has been criticised for his perceived homophobia, particularly when he deposed (defrocked) 36-year-old pastor Maris Sants from holy orders. Sants was known for ministering to AIDS patients, but Vanags deposed the priest "due to his promotion of a tolerant attitude to homosexuality". Through a statement by Mara Grigola, secretary to Vanags, he accused Sants of expressing in public "information that is against Lutheran doctrine". He also stated, "Persons who accept homosexual orientation as normal cannot work in the Latvian Evangelical Lutheran Church." Sants told AFP that his dismissal came without warning, following an interview he gave with Radio Free Europe/Radio Liberty in which he discussed his own homosexuality. "It's the practice in our church to dismiss people and not consult them. The church is not only conservative, but going backwards" said Sants, who added that he had been criticised by church officials for ministering to AIDS sufferers.

Vanags contributed an essay to the 2002 anti-homosexuality book Homoseksuālisms - cilvēces negods un posts, edited by Aivars Garda, the founder of the ultranationalist Latvian National Front. "Now homosexuals are recognized as a minority so in principle after them pedophiles may also be recognized as a minority", Vanags was quoted as saying in a January 2002 article in the daily Rīgas Balss. He is also quoted as saying, "What we could actually say to our brothers and sisters who are in this homosexual orientation, is that they're welcome to receive all that the Gospel means for the church, but we cannot accept their homosexual relationships as a normal alternative to marriage".
