= Kārlis Irbe =

Latvian politician

The Most Reverend Kārlis Irbe
- Bishop of the LELB
- Church: Evangelical Lutheran Church of Latvia
- See: Riga
- Elected: 24 February 1922
- In office: 1922–1931
- Successor: Teodors Grīnbergs

Orders
- Ordination: 13 April 1887
- Consecration: 16 July 1922 by Nathan Söderblom

Personal details
- Born: 7 August 1861 Lielsatiķu (now Saldus Municipality), Courland Governorate, Russian Empire
- Died: 23 March 1934 (aged 72) Riga, Latvia
- Buried: Forest Cemetery, Riga
- Parents: Kristaps Irbe; Lavīze Dišlere
- Education: University of Tartu

Karlis Irbe (7 August 1861 – 23 March 1934) was a Latvian prelate of the Evangelical Lutheran Church of Latvia and the first bishop of the Evangelical Lutheran Church of Latvia from 1922 until his resignation in 1931.

== Biography ==
Irbe was born in Lielsatiķu “Sīļos” (now Brocēni in Gaiķi Parish, Saldus Municipality) in the Courland Governorate of the Russian Empire. His father was Kristaps Irbe and his mother Lavīze (born Dišlere). He received his first education in Gaiķu and Aizupes primary schools and in Horna private school in Saldū. From 1881 to 1886 he studied Theology at the University of Tartu. He was a member of student society "Lettonia". After completing his studies, he served in the parish of Smiltene. In 1887 he went to Moscow to continue his training and minister to the German community at the church of Sts Peter and Paul where he was ordained on April 13 of the same year. He was then appointed as pastor of Drustu draudzes parish where he remained till 1902. In 1902 he was elected Dean of the Cesis District however he resigned some time later. In 1905 he accepted a post at the Maldonian Girls' school in Riga.

During the First World War he lived in Russia and Ukraine where in 1915 he became pastor in Kharkiv to the Latvian refugee congregation. In 1917 he returned to Moscow and founded the first Latvian Church in Moscow. In 1917 he also began work on the establishing the Latvian Lutheran Church. With the permission for the establishment of the Consistory, the Russian Ministry of Justice appointed Kārlis Irbis as the President of the Latvian Evangelical Lutheran Consistory with the right of the General Principle. In 1920 Irbe returned to Latvia and participated in the creation of the constitution of the Latvian church. The 2nd Sinode of Pastors and Presenters of the Evangelical Lutheran Church of Latvia took place in Riga between 21 and 24 February 1922. In a secret election, Irbe was elected bishop of the Evangelical Lutheran Church of Latvia with 347 votes in favor. He was consecrated bishop by the Archbishop of Uppsala Nathan Söderblom on 16 July 1922 in St James's Church in Riga.

During his time as bishop, Irbe accomplished a number of things notably the creation of the church's constitution, the creation of a new hymnal and the establishment of the liturgical calendar. Irbe was awarded the Order of the Polar Star. Nonetheless, Irbe encountered significant problems during his term as bishop notably the mutual intolerance and oppression of the German and Latvian Lutherans, the loss of the Church of St. James (since 1923 the Cathedral of the "new" Roman Catholic Archdiocese of Riga) and issues with Riga Cathedral. Irbe actively, but unsuccessfully, opposed the return of the Church of St James to the Latvian Roman Catholic Church and the transfer of the Dome Church to the Latvian church from the German-speaking Lutherans. On 10 November 1931 Bishop Irbe convened an extraordinary synod in which he announced his resignation, the reason being that the government passed laws which interfered with church autonomy. He spent the last years actively working on the development of the youth industry. He died on 23 March 1934 at his desk in Riga. He was buried in Riga Forest Cemetery.
