= Lato Lapsa =

- Born: May 16, 1969 (age 57); Riga, Latvian Soviet Socialist Republic
- Education: University of Latvia, Faculty of History and Philosophy
- Years active: 1990-present
- Known for: Anti-corruption activism
- Website: latolapsa.com

Lato Lapsa (born May 16, 1969, in Riga) is a Latvian publicist, investigative journalist, anti-corruption activist and book author known for his works about Latvian politics and his travels in various Asian, African and American countries.

Lapsa, founder of the online portal Pietiek.com, has published books critically analyzing several well-known politicians, including Latvia's unofficial oligarchic trio—Aivars Lembergs, Andris Šķēle, and Ainārs Šlesers.

Lapsa's journalism has been controversial and has sparked heated public debate. He has been sued for defamation, including a case filed by Parex Bank in 2011. Lapsa has also taken legal action against others, such as Kārlis Zuiks for defamation and Einars Repše for allegedly making false income declarations.

== Early life ==
Born to geographers Vito and Tamāra Lapsa, Lato Lapsa studied at the University of Latvia's Faculty of History and Philosophy.

== Career ==
Lapsa began his journalism career in May 1990 with the newspaper Diena after returning from military service in the Soviet Army. From 1998 to 2000, he served as the editor-in-chief of the news agency LETA but resigned due to workload pressures to focus on writing books and publicist activities. In 2001, he was also editor of the men's magazine Klubs.

Lato Lapsa began compiling annual lists of Latvian millionaires in 1997, using information from open sources.

In May 2006, Lapsa, together with Kristīne Jančevska, published the book "Kas ir Lembergs? Ventspils mēra ceļš uz naudu un varu" (Who is Lembergs? The Ventspils Mayor's Path to Money and Power). The book examined the political and financial activities of Aivars Lembergs, the long-time mayor of Ventspils. During the book's development, Lapsa reported receiving threats. He turned to the Security Police after finding an anonymous letter in his mailbox warning that if he continued working on the book, he and his co-author risked "ending up disabled or dead." Lembergs denied any involvement and dismissed the book as part of a politically motivated campaign against him.

In 2007, Lato Lapsa published Litigation Kitchen, a controversial book that included transcripts of allegedly wiretapped phone conversations originating in the office of leading lawyer Andris Grutups between 1998 and 2000, which raised serious questions about the integrity of the Latvian judiciary. The book accused some judges of unethical and illegal behavior, including discussing cases outside of court and being influenced by political and business elites. In response, a special parliamentary commission was formed to investigate the claims. While the commission's interim report did not confirm the specific allegations, it acknowledged improvements in the judiciary. Three judges resigned, but no charges were filed.

In March 2008, Lapsa and Kristīne Jančevska published "Kampējs. Stāsts par Andri Šķēli un vērdiņu" (The Grabber: A Story About Andris Šķēle and the Money). The book focused on the political and business activities of former Latvian Prime Minister Andris Šķēle, particularly his role in the privatization process following the collapse of the USSR and Latvia's independence.

In 2010 Lapsa gained attention for his access to extensive documentation related to a criminal investigation involving politician and Ventspils mayor Aivars Lembergs. On September 12, 2010, he announced his decision to leave Latvia and shut down his websites, including one described as a Latvian equivalent of "Wikileaks Lite".

His investigative journalism has frequently led to controversy and legal disputes. In January 2011, Parex Bank sued him for defamation. Lapsa has also taken legal action against several individuals, including Kārlis Zuika and Einars Repše, for defamation and inaccuracies in their financial declarations.

=== Parex bank ===
In 2010, Lapsa leaked a Nomura report on his website Kargins.com, revealing alleged financial misconduct involving the Latvian government and the European Bank for Reconstruction and Development (EBRD) in the handling of Parex Bank's collapse. The report suggested that taxpayers were burdened with the losses while also compensating the EBRD for its role in the cover-up. Following the leak, Lapsa was pressured by the State Security Service and took down the website. Fragments of the report have survived, and allegations of a continued cover-up persist in 2024 with Parex's successor, Citadele Bank.

=== Arrest in 2015 ===
On April 29, 2015, days before Riga hosted the World Press Freedom Awards, Lapsa was detained by the State Security Service (DP). Lapsa, known for exposing corruption and running the whistleblowing website Pietiek.com, was held after entering the DP headquarters with a recording device. He stated that officers provided no explanation beyond claiming recorders were not allowed and threatened to use force if he resisted.

Lapsa had intended to deliver a deposition to DP chief Normunds Mežviets. His detention followed a recent incident where his website published a transcript of a previous visit to the DP office, during which officers failed to provide certification for the scanning equipment they used on him.

During his detention, Lapsa reported hearing his colleague, investigative journalist Agnese Margevica, being questioned about the sale of Citadele Bank. The incident drew criticism, as it coincided with an international event celebrating press freedom.

=== Detention in 2025 ===
On January 30, 2025, Lapsa was detained by the Latvian State Police on suspicion of violating restrictions on the reproduction and distribution of a criminal case, unlawful handling of personal data, money laundering, and defamation. The arrest was reported by Latvian Television on January 31.

Lapsa has been under law enforcement scrutiny for some time. In May 2024, he was convicted of harassing and defaming lawyer Romualds Vonsovičs in connection with his book Kolaborants (in English: Collaborationist) and was sentenced to 300 hours of community service. He began serving his sentence in late 2024, reportedly conducting archival research for a new book. His recent social media posts indicate that he has been working on a publication about Latvian riflemen.
