= Rinalds Grants =

Latvian Lutheran archbishop (born 1974)

The Most Reverend Rinalds Grants
- Archbishop of Riga
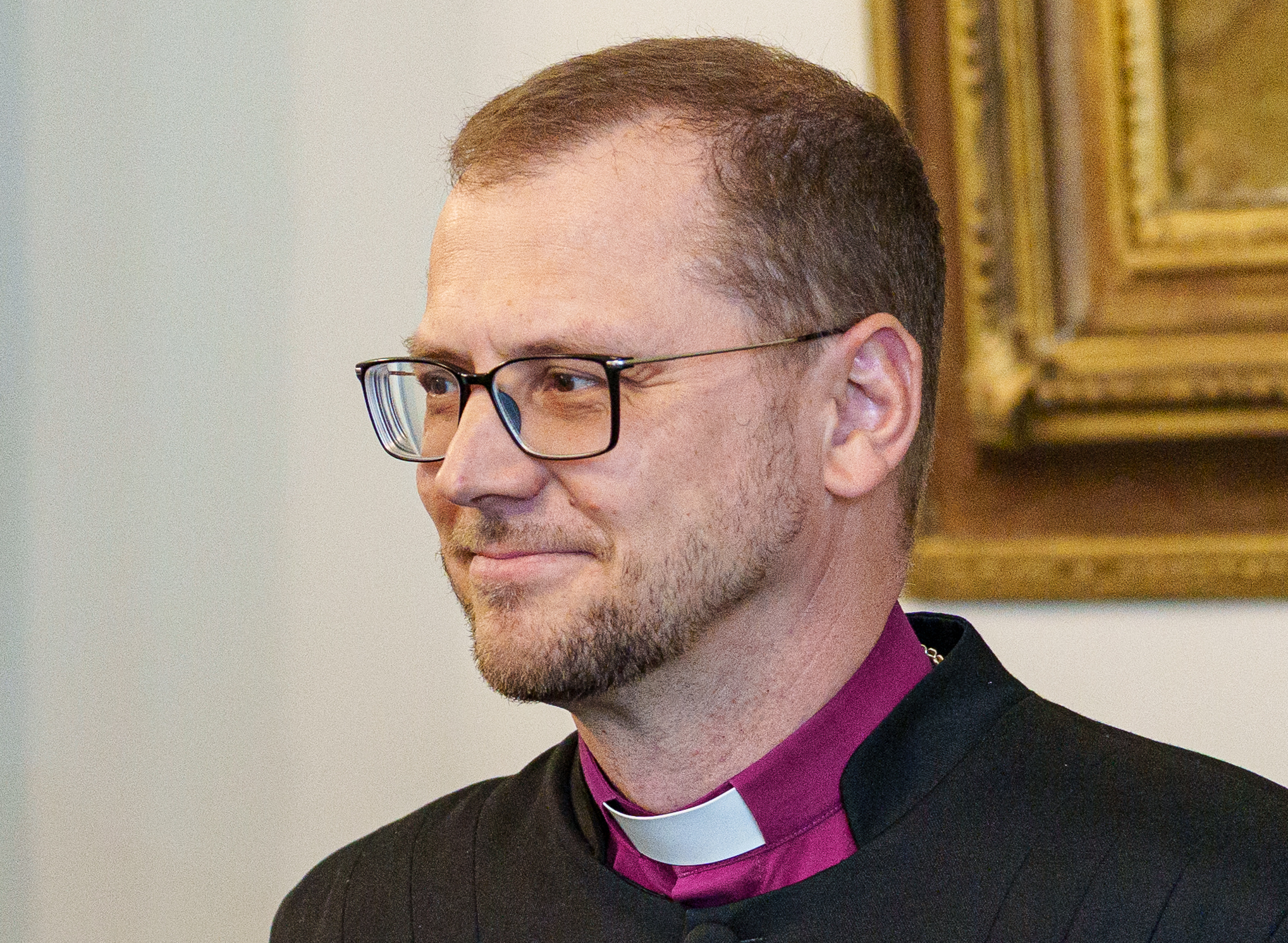
- Grants in 2025
- Church: Evangelical Lutheran Church of Latvia
- Archdiocese: Riga
- Elected: 7 June 2025
- In office: Since 30 August 2025
- Predecessor: Jānis Vanags
- Other post: Auxiliary bishop of Riga (2022–2025)

Orders
- Ordination: 30 April 2001
- Consecration: 16 July 2022 by Jānis Vanags

Personal details
- Born: July 10, 1974 (age 51) Saldus, Latvian SSR, USSR
- Denomination: Lutheran
- Spouse: Ieva Vilmani
- Children: 4
- Education: Latvian Police Academy, University of Latvia

Rinalds Grants (born 10 July 1974) is a Latvian Lutheran bishop. Since 2025, he has been archbishop of Riga and primate of the Evangelical Lutheran Church of Latvia (LELB). He began his career as a criminal investigator before attending theological school and pursuing ordination as a priest. Following service as pastor of Old St. Gertrude's Church in Riga, he became auxiliary bishop of the diocese in 2022, then was elected and installed as archbishop in 2025.

== Early life, education and career ==
Grants was born in Saldus in 1974. He began his career in policing, working as a criminal investigator in Saldus from 1993 to 1994 and from 1998 to 2001 as a senior inspector for Interpol in Latvia. Grants also received a bachelor's degree from the Latvian Police Academy, a qualification as a lawyer and a master's degree from the University of Latvia's Faculty of Theology. He converted to Christianity during his youth and experienced a call to ordained ministry during his years at the police academy. After completing his police studies, he enrolled in Luther Academy, the seminary of the LELB, while continuing his work in law enforcement.

== Ordained ministry ==
After training for ministry, Grants became a pastor at Old St. Gertrude's Church in Riga in 2000. While there, he ran a course for fathers and led the growth of the population of young adults and young families in the church. In 2017, he was additionally named vice-rector of Luther Academy. He was elected and consecrated as auxiliary bishop of the Archdiocese of Riga in 2022. He was consecrated at Riga Cathedral alongside Uldis Gailītis in a service that also marked the 500th anniversary of the Protestant Reformation in Latvia. As archbishop of the Anglican Church in North America, an ecumenical partner of the LELB, Foley Beach was a co-consecrator.

In June 2025, Grants won a majority of votes in the LELB's synod and became archbishop-elect, succeeding Jānis Vanags, who was scheduled to retire. In press interviews, Grants said that he did not intend to change the LELB's policies on ordination of women, which was rejected under his predecessor, nor the ordination of LGBT clergy and same-sex marriage, which the LELB prohibits. Grants was installed as archbishop of Riga at Riga Cathedral on 30 August 2025. ACNA bishops Ray Sutton and Ryan Reed participated in the installation service.

== Personal life ==
Grants is married to Ieva, and they have three sons and one daughter.
