= Rīgas Balss =

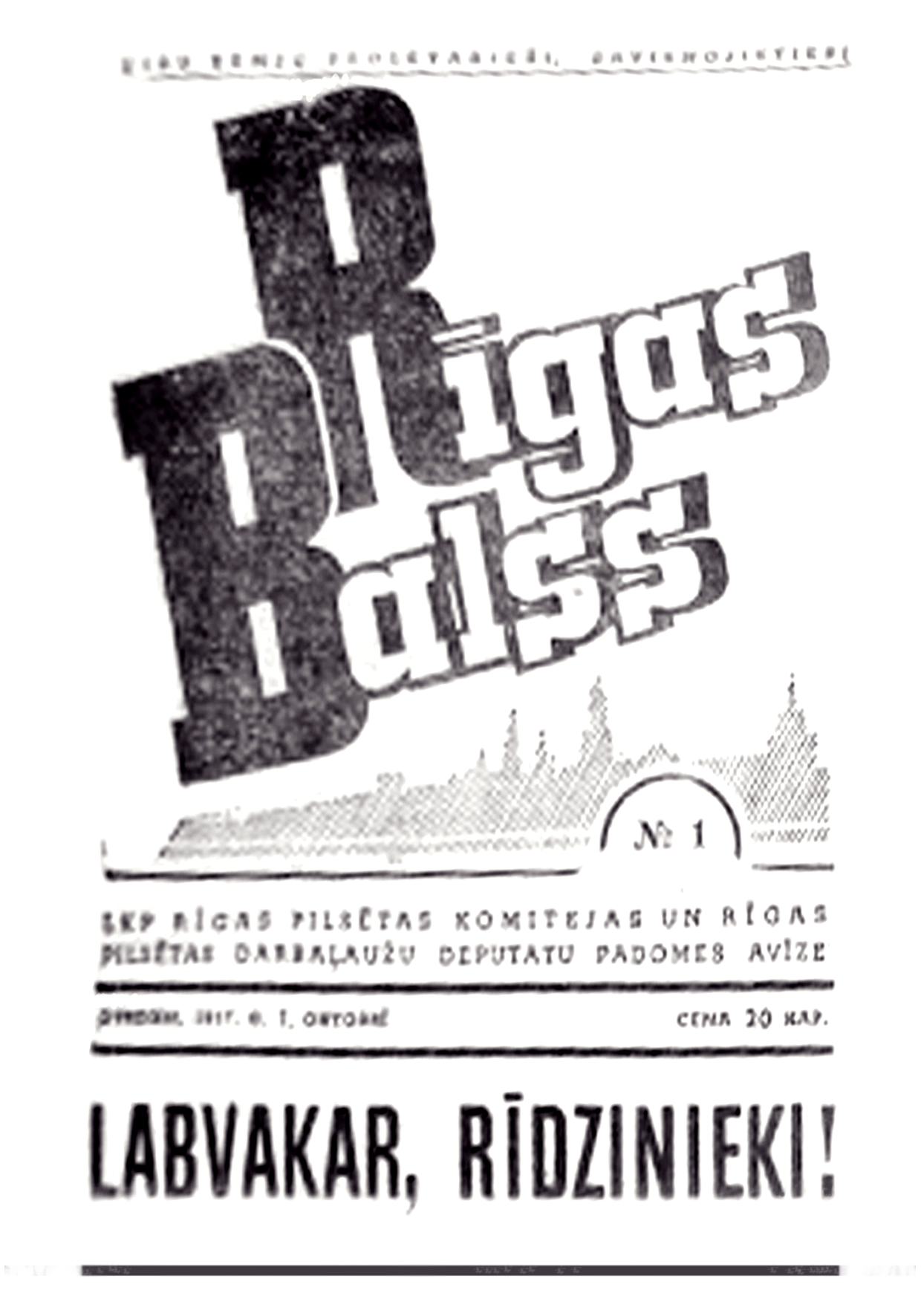
- Founded: 1957
- Ceased publication: 2009
- Language: Latvian, Russian
- Headquarters: Riga

Rīgas Balss (Russian: Ригас Балсс) was a tabloid newspaper published in Riga, Latvia, and published in both the Latvian and Russian languages. The Russian edition became Vechernyaya Riga in 2001 and ceased publication in 2004. The Latvian edition has turned into a magazine in 2008 and ceased publication in 2009.
