= Lutheran Church in Norway =

Church body in Norway

The Lutheran Church in Norway and Iceland
- Classification: Protestant
- Orientation: Confessional Lutheranism
- Polity: Episcopal
- Primate: Bishop Torkild Masvie
- Associations: International Lutheran Council
- Region: Norway
- Origin: 2005
- Separated from: Church of Norway

The Lutheran Church in Norway and Iceland (LKNI) (Norwegian: Den Lutherske Kirke i Norge og Island Icelandic: Lúterska kirkjan í Noregi og á Íslandi) is a small confessional Lutheran Church body in Norway with a congregation in Iceland. It is a member of International Lutheran Council.
