= Latvian Evangelical Lutheran Church Worldwide =

Lutheran Christian denomination

- Abbreviation: LELBP
- Classification: Christian
- Orientation: Protestant
- Theology: Lutheranism
- Polity: Episcopal
- Archbishop: Kārlis Žols
- Associations: Lutheran World Federation, World Council of Churches, Conference of European Churches, Porvoo Communion
- Region: Australia, Belgium, Brazil, Canada, Germany, Republic of Ireland, Latvia, Netherlands, Sweden, United Kingdom, United States, Venezuela
- Origin: 1922
- Members: 25,000
- Official website: www.lelbpasaule.lv

The Latvian Evangelical Lutheran Church Worldwide (Latvian: Latvijas Evaņģēliski luteriskā baznīca pasaulē, abbreviated LELBP) is a Lutheran denomination with a presence in Australia, Belgium, Brazil, Canada, Germany, Ireland, Latvia, the Netherlands, Sweden, the United Kingdom, the United States, and Venezuela. Until 2020 it was known as the Latvian Evangelical Lutheran Church Abroad (Latvian: Latvijas Evaņģēliski luteriskā baznīca ārpus Latvijas (LELBāL)).

It is a member of the Lutheran World Federation, which it joined in 1947. It is also a member of the World Council of Churches and the Conference of European Churches and part of the Porvoo Communion. The church was originally established in 1922. During the Second World War, when Latvia was occupied and incorporated into the Soviet Union, the archbishop and 131 (being 55%) of the clergy went to exile.

In 2014, Lauma Lagzdiņš Zuševics, a Latvian American, was the first woman elected Archbishop of the Latvian Evangelical Lutheran Church Abroad. The current Archbishop of the LELBP is Kārlis Žols.

In 2016, the church established itself within Latvia, and Archbishop Zuševics stated that it would have to change its name accordingly. Later that year the Evangelical Cross Congregation of Liepāja left the Evangelical Lutheran Church of Latvia (LELB/ELCL) and joined the LELBA/LELCA instead due to its support for the ordination of women which the LELB/ELCL had banned the previous week. The split between the two churches thus became less geographic and more theological. In October 2020, the church changed its name to the Latvian Evangelical Lutheran Church Worldwide.
