= Prauliena Parish =

Parish of Latvia

- parish of Latvia
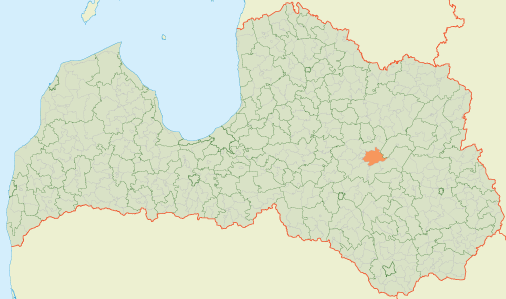
- 56°48′31″N 26°22′15″E

- Location within Latvia
- Country: Latvia

Area
  - Total: 197.28 km^{2} (76.17 sq mi)
  - Land: 191.1 km^{2} (73.8 sq mi)
  - Water: 6.18 km^{2} (2.39 sq mi)

Population (1 January 2026)
  - Total: 1,304
  - Density: 6.824/km^{2} (17.67/sq mi)
- Website: www.prauliena.lv

Prauliena parish (Latvian: Praulienas pagasts) is an administrative unit of Madona Municipality, Latvia.
