= Mārcis Auziņš =

Latvian physicist

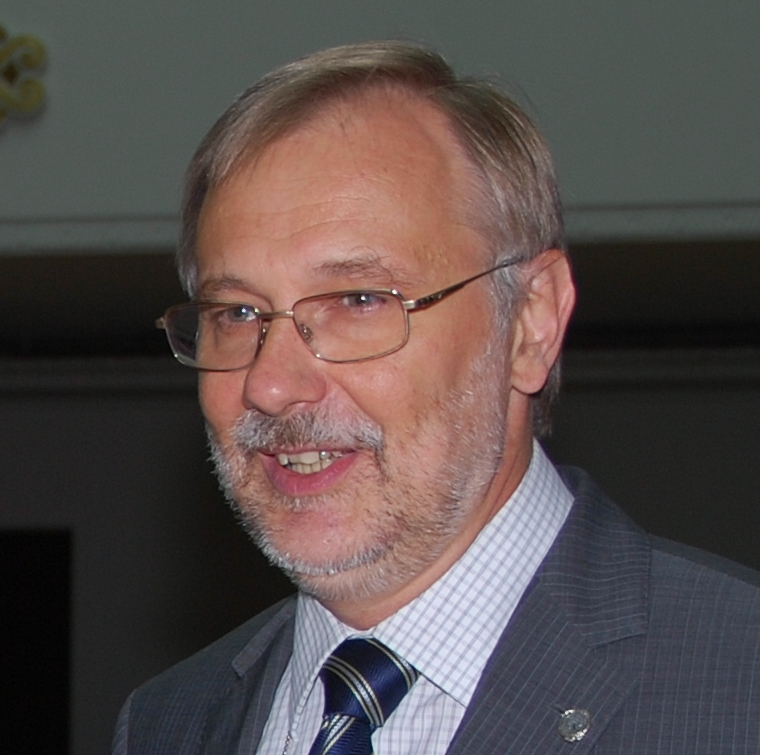
- Born: 11 January 1956 (age 70); Riga, Latvian SSR
- Education: University of Latvia
- Occupation: Physicist

Mārcis Auziņš (born 11 January 1956) is a Latvian physicist. From 2007 to 2015 he served as the rector of the University of Latvia. In 1998, Auziņš was also elected a member of the Latvian Academy of Sciences. In 2005 he was a visiting Miller professor at University of California, Berkeley

== Education ==
- University of Latvia (Faculty of Mathematics and Physics) 1979
- Dr.phys (cand. Phys. Math. Sciences), Saint Petersburg State University, 1986
- Dr. habil. phys., University of Latvia, 1995
