= Kalpaka Boulevard Library =

Former mansion and current university library in Latvia

- Bibliotēka Kalpaka bulvārī
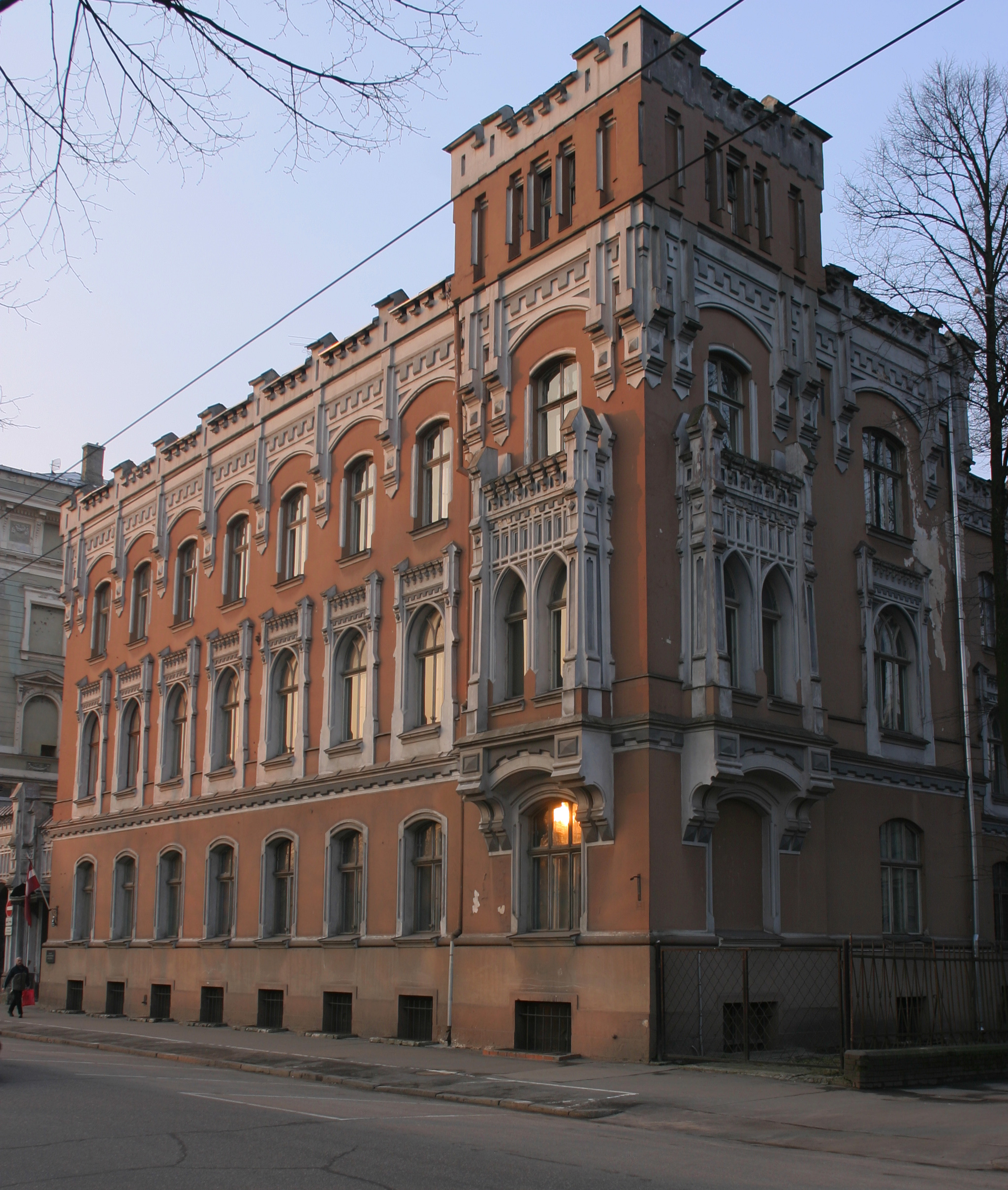
- Interactive map of the Kalpaka Boulevard Library area

General information
- Type: Private residence (original), library (current)
- Architectural style: Gothic revival
- Location: Riga, Latvia
- Coordinates: 56°57′11″N 24°6′50″E
- Construction started: 1874
- Completed: 1878
- Client: Ludwig Wilhelm Kerkovius

Technical details
- Structural system: masonry

Design and construction
- Architect: Jānis Frīdrihs Baumanis

The Kalpaka Boulevard Library (Latvian: Bibliotēka Kalpaka bulvārī) is a branch of the University of Latvia libraries located on its eponymous street in central Riga, Latvia. It is housed in a historic mansion built between 1874 and 1878 to designs of Jānis Frīdrihs Baumanis. It is technically the newest branch library of the University of Latvia, and is used primarily for research by the Center for Humanities and Social Sciences.

== Design and history ==
The project for the Karkovius House on what was originally Totlbena (now Kalpaka) boulevard 4 dates back to 1874, but the construction was completed only in 1878. J. F. Baumanis, one of Riga's more prominent nineteenth-century architects, designed it as a mansion for Ludwig Wilhelm Kerkovius (1831–1904), a successful lumber merchant and Mayor of Riga, and his family of nine children. The three-story building is designed in an expressive Gothic-revival style, following the asymmetrical structure of Gothic castles. The building is designed as a typical mansion of its time with two entrances and two courtyards. The first is a small closed garden with an entrance only from the owner's apartment, while the second consists of a yard that originally served the stables and the carriage servants. The structures rests on a vaulted cellar, and the layout of each of the floors was identical with ten rooms each.

The facades of the building (both towards Kalpaka Boulevard and both side facades) are articulated elaborately in plaster in the English Gothic tradition. Despite the height of the second floor created by the tall lancet windows, the facade of the building is nonetheless topped by a wide attic. The initial painting of the façade, found at the level of the first floor, was yellow, while the plinth of the building was painted brown. The building has ten different types of windows and nine types of doors. All the original windows with the first equipment have been preserved in the façade facing Kalpaka Boulevard, as well as all the original internal shutters on the first floor. The original external sash of the windows have been preserved in the courtyard facade. Stylistically analogous profiling has been created for the replaced sashes and frames.

Most of the original doors in the building have been preserved with neo-Gothic decor. The entrance to the subsidiary building is next to the large (second) courtyard gate, but the main entrance and the "black" (servant's) staircase are from the courtyard. In this courtyard there used to be an attached horse stable for four horses and a carriage. On the second floor of the extension there were two living quarters for servants and a storage warehouse.

The oak spiral staircase is made of turned balusters and use wall-mounted brackets and metal steps. The interior includes luxurious, historic doors with baroque iron ornaments and expressive wood carvings. The main staircase and lobby feature rich dark red wall paintings and multi-colored ceiling paintings. Oak parquet has been preserved in several rooms, which reveals various and different pattern compositions in each room: in the reception room on the first floor, the parquet is in the pattern of a chessboard, while the parquet in the hall contains star-type marquetry.

The traditional cellar was used for various economic purposes. In the twentieth century there were at one point 20–30 apartments in the basement. The renovation of 2012–13 renovated the basement, but preserved the original wooden wall panels. The upper floors are actually outfitted in an Art Deco style reminiscent of the 1930s, with floors covered with parquet in a herringbone pattern.

While the house was still used as a residence, before the 1940s, there was a large, well-equipped ten-room apartment on each of the three floors with a separate "black" or backyard staircase and a maid's room by the kitchen. The owners lived on the first floor and rented out the apartments on the second and third levels.

The design of the building also discloses the functions of the ground floor rooms – anteroom, office, waiting room, hall, fireplace room, winter garden, central dining room, four bedrooms, a kitchen, maid's room, bathroom and two toilets. The building was originally heated by an oven, but only one round white-tiled stove has survived, which is currently located in the main staircase. In 1908, the building was added to the city's sewer system.

== Residents ==
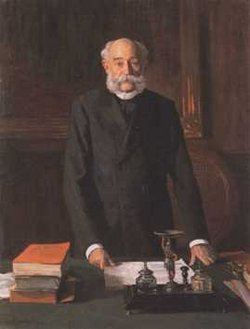
Ludwig Wilhelm Kerkovius (1831–1904), the original owner of the mansion.

The history of the Riga Art Promotion Society ("Rigasche Kunstverein") and the Riga City Painting Gallery is connected with the house on Kalpaka Boulevard. Until 1878, the collections of these two organizations were housed in unsuitable conditions in the hall of the Riga Polytechnic (now in the main building of the University of Latvia at Raina Boulevard 19). From 1879, it was decided to rent the premises in the Kerkovius House, where they remained until 1905, when the city's Art Museum was completed.

After the death of L.W. Kerkovius, the building was maintained by his heirs, but from 1920 to 1940 a portion of the house remained subdivided into apartments, with part of the space rented to the Health Care Museum, the joint-stock company Ķieģelis, the student corporation Imerija, and other organizations. There were five residential apartments in the building, three of which were one-room apartments without a kitchen, in the basement; one one-room apartment with a kitchen was located above the garage and there was one two-room apartment in the attic.

In 1940, the University of Latvia became interested in the property, and on July 15, the university asked the Minister of Education to allocate new premises for the needs of its Central Library, since the lot of the Karkovius house at Raina Boulevard 9 already abutted the premises of the main university library. This might have been complicated since by that time, in the middle of the Second World War, the property no longer belonged entirely to Karkovius' heirs, who were themselves German citizens; one part was owned by Latvijas Kredītbanka. Additionally, the portion of the property along Raina Boulevard 9 was owned by a certain N. Menzendorf, who was then living in Switzerland. However, any potential problems were avoided since all the owners agreed to sell their various stakes in the property. In the ensuing transformations under the auspices of the University of Latvia, the interiors were modified to accommodate bookstacks and reading rooms, a process which mostly involved removing the original partitions. Hence the house continues to honor the legacy of its original inhabitants in that it continues in service to the city.

== Adaptation and renovation ==
The building was again renovated in 2012–13. These renovations replaced the rear buildings with a modern structure.

In the luxurious anteroom of the first floor of the historic building, there are fragments of the original ceiling that have been preserved, which gives the opportunity to see the painting, both as it was when the building was built and later, when renovated in the 1890s. Kerkovius' former office now contains a self-service coat-check for visitors.

The modernized building contains a multifunctional reading room, which also hosts conferences, seminars, training sessions, presentations, book opening parties and other events. At one time, this room was a luxurious guest hall and waiting room, hence the history of the building can be seen in the samples of the parquet floor remaining. As Kerkovius was himself a great admirer and supporter of art, the structure has historically served at least partially as gallery space. Continuing in this tradition, the Library of the University of Latvia also exhibits artworks there. Currently, visitors can admire paintings of Velga Zvirgzdiņa; watercolors of Monika Oce; paintings of Roberts Muža, and drawings by Olafs Muižnieks.

The decoration of the small fireplace room is an excellent glimpse into a period domestic interior. The room features restored original Moorish-style murals with stencil techniques, which testify to the high level of craftsmanship involved in its creation. The decoration here is very luxurious, as the lower part of the wall is illusively painted with a plinth, while the upper part of the walls is decorated with an intricate carpet ornament with a wicker motif, and the ceiling is painted in an intricate design containing an eight-pointed star in the center. The polychrome paint uses brown, blue and pink tones. The original fireplace itself, however, has not survived.

The library's recreation room, located in place of the former main kitchen, is a favorite place for visitors, with its white furniture interior accented by blue floral ornament. The black-and-white photographs disclose the timeline of the Library's history. The Kerkovius family's dining area now houses the Library's service area.

The renovated mahogany closet in the conservatory houses part of a collection of books donated by the Kerkovius family, who now live in many countries around the world on all continents. After a family reunion in Riga in 2001, the University of Latvia received from them a valuable donation of books, most of which consists of fiction, publications in literary studies and philosophy, along with works on sociology, anthropology, linguistics, art and history. In total, the collection contains 926 books – editions from 1856 to 1997, mainly from the twentieth century. Some of the books are in German, published in the 1960s and 1970s.

After visiting the Kalpaka Boulevard Library in 2014, Joyce Kerkovius Heggli, the granddaughter of L.W. Kerkovius, presented the University of Latvia with a portrait of her ancestor, the original owner, painted in Riga in 1903 by the German portraitist Theodor Kraus.

== Library services ==
The Kalpaka Boulevard Library provides a full range of services required for academic work. Reference materials, encyclopedias, dictionaries, free basic library services and paid services are available in the service area on the second floor. The new building has an open access reading room, which houses the most popular publications in the humanities and social sciences in the last 10 years. For the convenience of researchers, six individual carrels have been set up, with views of the Esplanade, the site of Kerkovius's former rose garden, and the linden trees. Conference rooms for 30 or 70 people are also available.

For the first time since the initial renovation of the building in 1940, the LU Library has an exhibition space with a permanent display; it features parchments, engravings, and rare items from special collections, such as picture editions, maps, manuscripts and other unique period objects. An important place in the exhibition is the collection of the first rector of the University of Latvia, Professor Ernest Felsberg (1866–1928), as well as the treasures of the famous Sinologist Professor Peter Schmidt (1869–1938), which include Chinese and Manchurian books and manuscripts, especially xylographs. The exhibition hall is open to the public free of charge during the Library's opening hours. The University of Latvia additionally offers public tours of the Kalpaka Boulevard Library.

== See also ==
- List of libraries in Latvia
