= Kārlis Gailītis =

20th-century Latvian Lutheran bishop

The Most Reverend Kārlis Gailītis
- Archbishop of Riga
- Archdiocese: Archdiocese of Riga
- Elected: 12 April 1989
- In office: 1989–1992
- Predecessor: Ēriks Mesters
- Successor: Jānis Vanags

Orders
- Ordination: 1976
- Consecration: 3 September 1989

Personal details
- Born: March 3, 1936 Latvia
- Died: November 22, 1992 (aged 56) Sabile, Latvia
- Denomination: Evangelical Lutheran Church of Latvia
- Occupation: Lutheran archbishop

Kārlis Gailītis (3 March 1936 – Sabile, 22 November 1992) was a Latvian Lutheran archbishop. He was the archbishop of the Evangelical Lutheran Church of Latvia, from 1989 to 1992, when he died in a car accident.

== Life and career ==
Gailītis was born in a family of teachers. He studied at the Evangelical Lutheran Theological Seminary, from 1971 to 1976. In September 1976, he was ordained a pastor. He started working afterwards at the Luther Church, in Riga, where he would serve until his election as archbishop. He worked as Secretary of the Consistory from 1981. In 1986, he obtained a master's degree in theology. He was a professor of comparative religion in the Theological Seminary for several years.

Gailītis was involved in the "revival and renewal" in the final years of the Soviet Union. He was elected archbishop at the XIV Synod of the Evangelical Lutheran Church of Latvia, at 12 April 1989, in Riga. He witnessed the final years of the Soviet Union as Latvia struggled for independence in 1991. In April 1992, he was reelected archbishop, at the XV Synod. He died in a car accident on 22 November 1992.
