= Evangelical Lutheran Church of Latvia =

Lutheran denomination in Latvia

- Classification: Protestant
- Orientation: Lutheran
- Scripture: Bible
- Theology: High church Lutheranism; Confessional Lutheranism
- Polity: Episcopal
- Primate: Rinalds Grants, Archbishop of Riga
- Altar and pulpit fellowship: Lutheran Church – Missouri Synod; Lutheran Church in Norway
- Associations: Lutheran World Federation; World Council of Churches; Conference of European Churches; Porvoo Communion (observer); International Lutheran Council
- Region: Latvia
- Independence: 1922
- Separated from: Catholic Church
- Congregations: 293
- Members: 250,000
- Official website: http://www.lelb.lv/

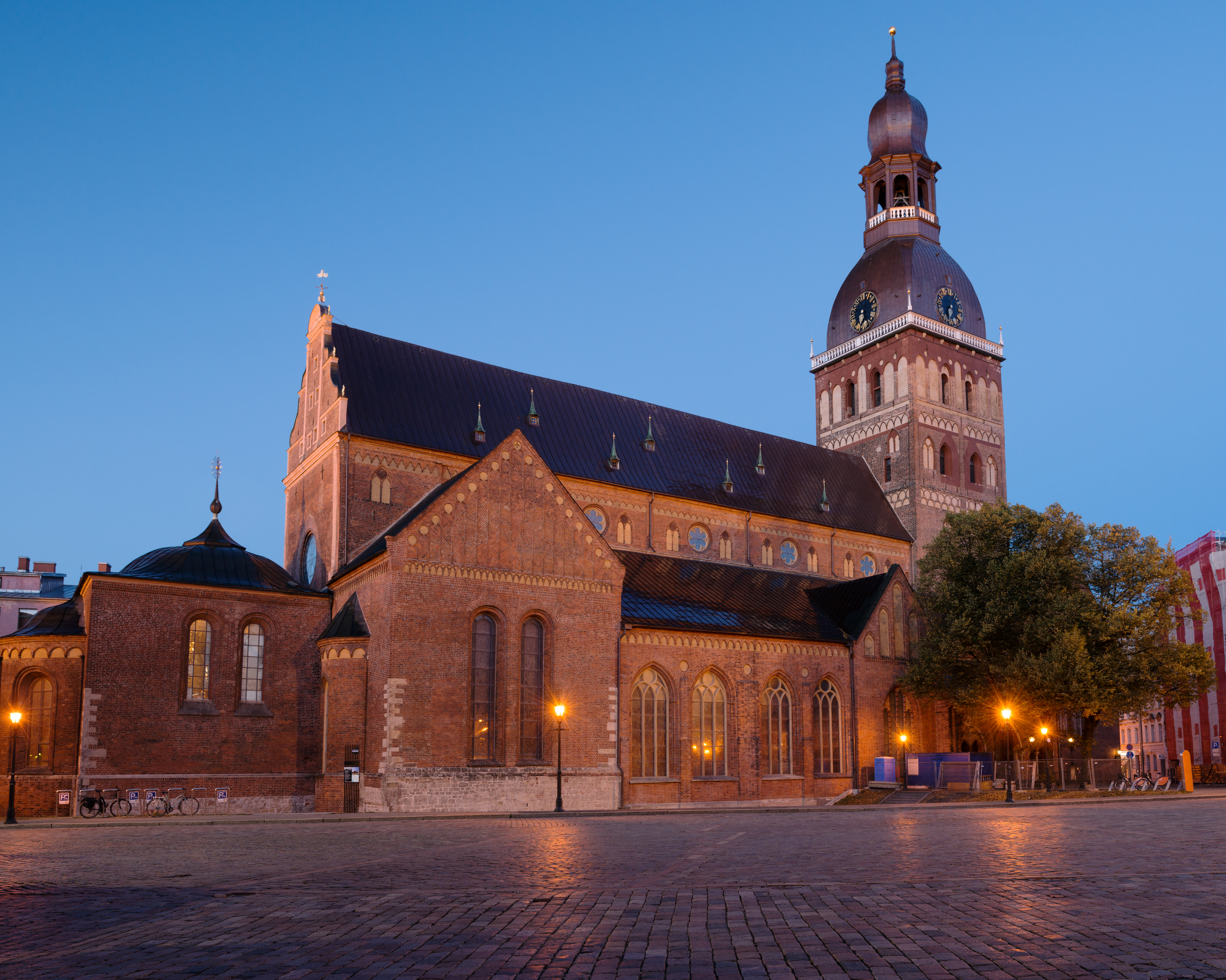
Riga Cathedral

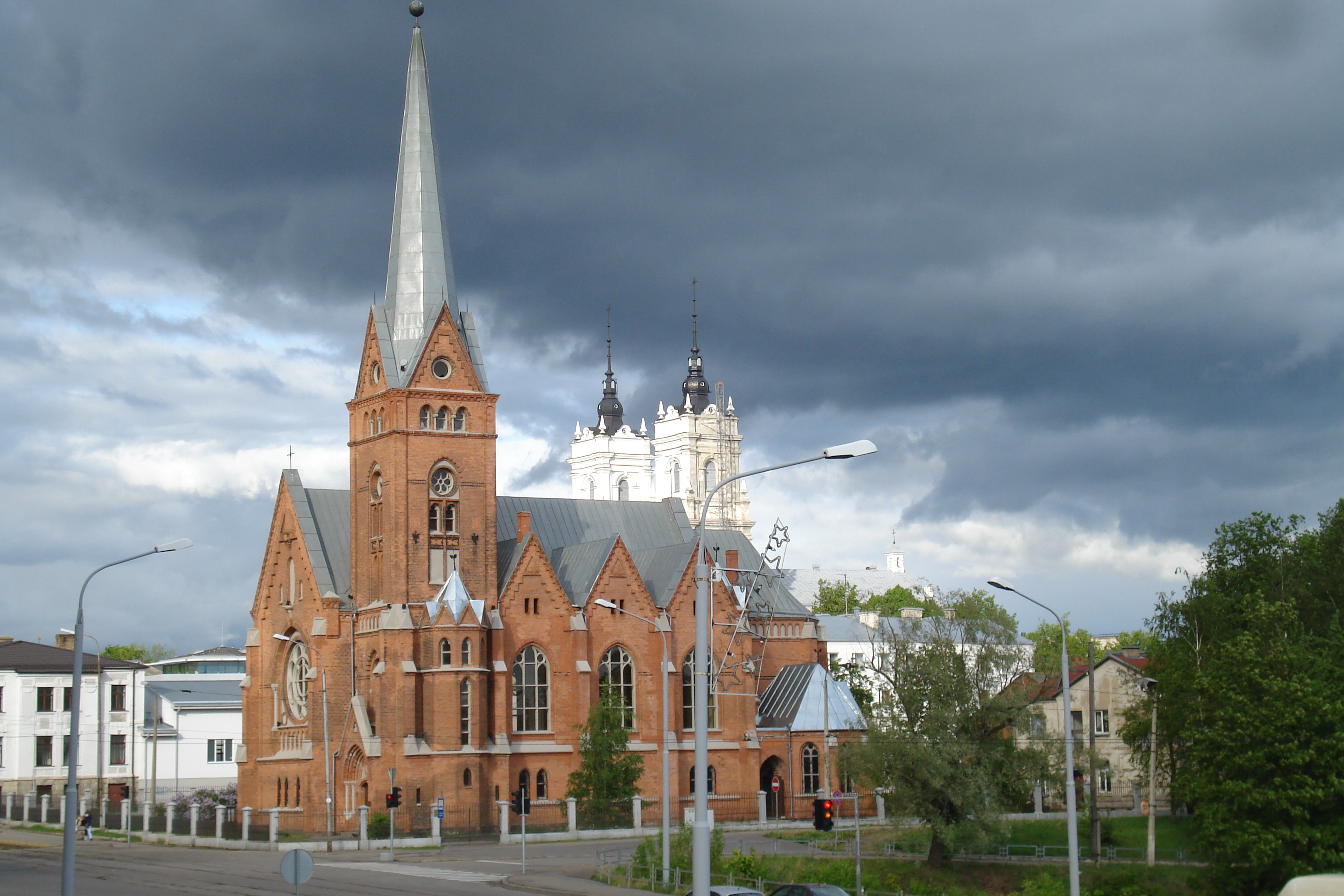
Daugavpils Martin Luther Cathedral

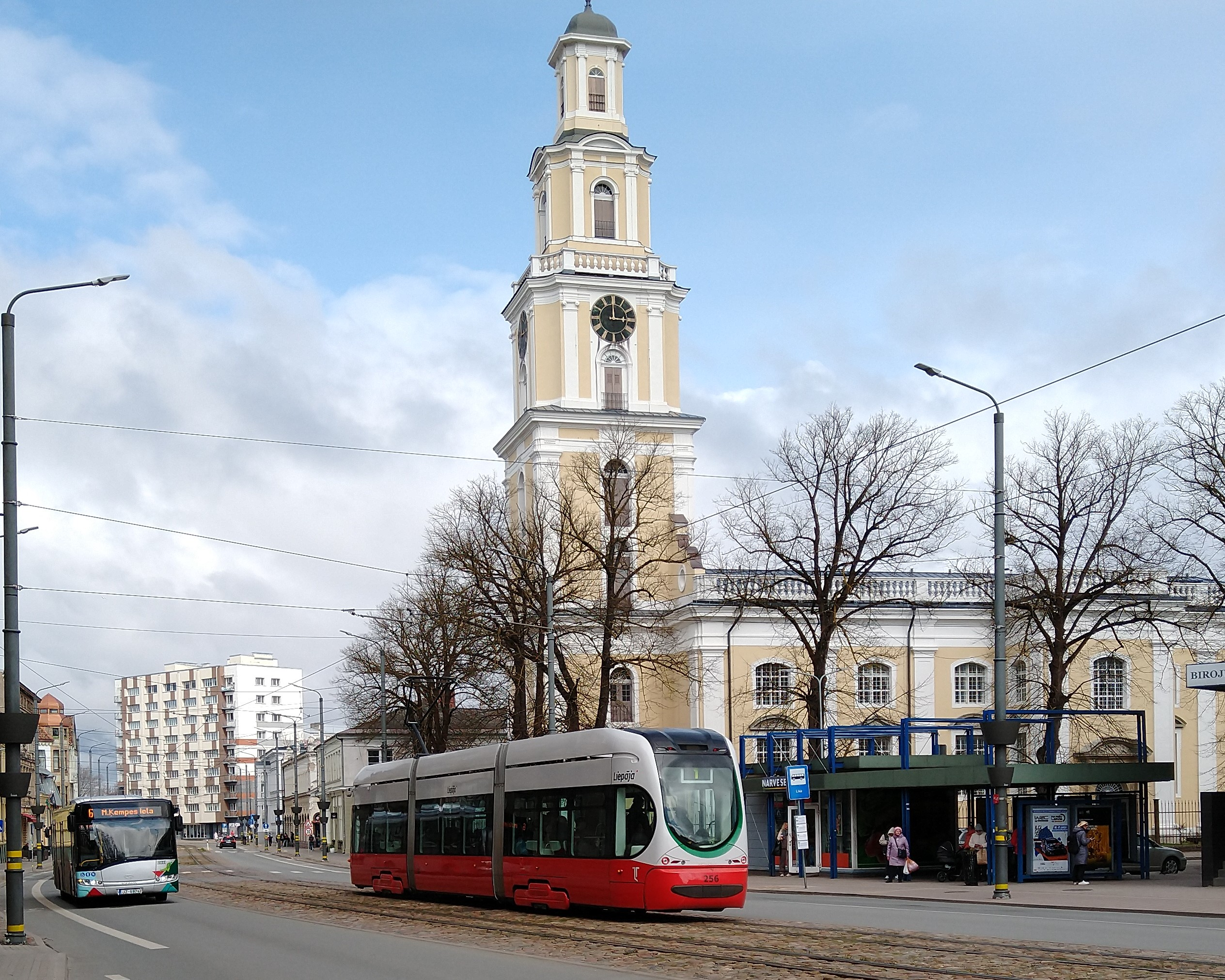
Liepāja Holy Trinity Cathedral

The Evangelical Lutheran Church of Latvia (Latvian: Latvijas Evaņģēliski luteriskā baznīca, or LELB) is a Lutheran Protestant church in Latvia. Latvia's Lutheran heritage dates back to the Reformation. The church reports having 250,000 members according to the Lutheran World Federation.

== History ==
The Evangelical Lutheran Church of Latvia (ELCL) sees itself as being in a continuous tradition of Christian life since the earliest recorded Christian missionary work in the area, in the 12th century. Latvia was highly influenced by the Reformation and the style of Lutheran church which emerged followed the more Protestant German-type Lutheranism. Riga became one of the first cities to actively support Luther's ideas. The spiritual renewal touched only the German-speaking ruling minority (almost all the pastors were German). The Latvian-speaking majority remained largely alienated from the church up to the beginning of the 18th century when the pietistic movement of Moravian (Herrnhut) Brethren reached Latvia. But the German domination of the Lutheran Church continued throughout the 19th century.

Until the 20th century, the Latvian Lutheran Church was part of the church organizations of Sweden or Russia. However, following the establishment of the Republic of Latvia (1918) the church moved towards a more historical catholic polity, and accepted consecration of bishops by the Church of Sweden. The independent Evangelical Lutheran Church of Latvia was established in 1922. A Swedish archbishop ordained Kārlis Irbe—who had been elected by the synod—as the Church's Archbishop, while a separate bishop was ordained for the German minority. Both the national-socialist and communist regimes persecuted the church harshly. Following the establishment of Soviet rule, the archbishop and up to 80% of the pastors were forced to emigrate or deported. It was not until 1954 that the activities of the Latvian Church within the USSR were re-legalized, albeit subject to certain restrictions.

After religious freedom returned to Latvia in 1988, the Church underwent a leadership change: figures accused of collaborating with the Soviet authorities were removed from church administration, and a new archbishop was elected. Since the fall of communism, the church has experienced growth and expansion. A special Synod in April 1989, following the return to post-communist independence, established a network of revived congregations, and put in place an almost entirely new leadership. In contrast to Estonia, where state atheism reduced the once 80% Lutheran majority to barely 10% by 2011, the Latvian Lutheran church saw its membership drop to around 20% but has recovered and now includes approximately 30% of the population. Along with the Church of Sweden, the ELCL now claims full apostolic succession. In 1975 the church, despite heavy opposition, decided to ordain women as pastors, but since 1993, under the leadership of Archbishop Jānis Vanags, it no longer does so. This position was confirmed in 2016 by a synodical resolution that only men may be ordained as priests. The resolution required a supermajority of at least 75% to pass, which it achieved with a 77% vote in favor. The abstentions were not counted, as required by church law, and complaints were made about the voting process, asserting that, had abstentions been counted, the measure would have failed.

== Structure ==
The Church is episcopal and synodical. This means that it is led by a Council of Bishops and governed by a Synod composed of clergy and laity. The Synod elects a Consistory which has a smaller membership and meets more frequently, to carry on the work of Synod between its formal meetings.

The Church is composed of three dioceses:

Diocese	Cathedral	Founded	Current bishop
Archdiocese of Riga	Riga Cathedral	1186	Rinalds Grants (Primate of Latvia)
Diocese of Liepāja	Holy Trinity Cathedral, Liepāja		Hanss Martins Jönsson
Diocese of Daugavpils	Martin Luther Cathedral, Daugavpils		Einārs Alpe

Within each diocese there are, in addition to the bishop, a number of senior clergy known as Deans. One is Dean of the Cathedral, and the others serve as Area Deans supervising clergy within a defined district. There are 16 such Deaneries within Latvia. The church does not have the historic three-fold ministry of Bishops, Priests, and Deacons. In the place of Deacon is the ministry of Evangelist who work in programmes of social care and outreach.

== Archbishop of Riga ==
The Archbishop serves as the president of the Council of Bishops, the Synod, and the Consistory. Following the death of Archbishop Kārlis Gailītis in 1992, a special Synod was convened in 1993 to elect a new Archbishop of Riga. Archbishop Jānis Vanags was elected and duly consecrated on 29 August 1993, by Henrik Svenungsson, the Bishop of Stockholm.

=== List of Archbishops of Riga ===
The medieval archbishops are listed at Archbishopric of Riga.

The following is a list of office holders since the restoration of the office. The first, Kārlis Irbe, was bishop in charge; the others have all been titled Archbishop of Riga.

- 1922–1933 – Kārlis Irbe
- 1933–1944 – Teodors Grīnbergs
- 1948–1968 – Gustavs Tūrs
- 1968 election – Pēteris Kleperis (elected archbishop, but died before his enthronement date)
- 1968 election – Alberts Freijs (elected archbishop, but died before his enthronement date)
- 1969–1985 – Jānis Matulis
- 1986–1989 – Ēriks Mesters
- 1989–1992 – Kārlis Gailītis (Archbishop Gailītis was killed in a car accident)
- 1993–2025 – Jānis Vanags
- 2025–present – Rinalds Grants

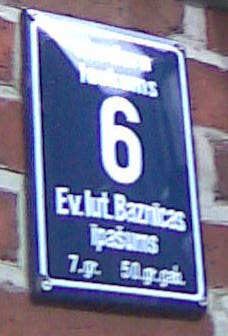
A plaque marking Lutheran church property at Rīgas Doms (Riga Lutheran cathedral), Herdera laukums 6

== Theology ==
The Evangelical Lutheran Church of Latvia is known for its theological conservatism and since Jānis Vanags' consecration as archbishop in 1993, it has opposed women's ordination. The highest governing body of the church amended the church rules in 2016. The proposal that only men may be ordained required a supermajority of 75%, which it has achieved with a 77% voting in favour. The decision received criticism from the Protestant Church in Germany, the Protestant Church of the Augsburg Confession in Austria and the Association of Protestant Churches in Europe (GEKE); however, ELCL is not part of GEKE and has broken communion with both the German and Austrian Churches due to theological differences. Women ordained prior to the ban may continue to serve. As of 2024, 14 ordained women were serving as ministers and evangelists in the church.

The church disapproves of active homosexuality and rejects same-sex unions. The church is also opposed to abortion and euthanasia.

== Statistics ==
The Evangelical Lutheran Church of Latvia reports that there are 136 pastors and 86 evangelists serving its 300 congregations. In 2013, the estimated baptized membership was 250,000. In comparison, the independent Latvian Evangelical Lutheran Church Worldwide has 25,020 baptized members.

== Affiliations ==
The ELCL is a member of the Lutheran World Federation (LWF), the World Council of Churches, the Conference of European Churches, and the International Lutheran Council.

The ELCL is not in full church fellowship with those LWF member church bodies who practise ordinations and marriages of homosexuals, looking on LWF more as a forum of discussions for Lutherans. It holds observer status in the Porvoo Communion, which unites episcopal Lutheran churches and Anglican churches in northern Europe.

ELCL is in full fellowship with the Lutheran Church – Missouri Synod (LCMS), of the United States and the Lutheran Church in Norway.

== See also ==
- List of Lutheran dioceses and archdioceses
