= St. John's Church, Saldus =

St. John's Church
- St. John's Evangelical Lutheran Church

- Location within Latvia
- 56°40′00″N 22°29′33″E
- Location: Kuldīgas Street 2, Saldus, Saldus pilsēta, LV-3801,
- Country: Latvia
- Denomination: Lutheran
- Website: saldusbaznica.lv

Saldus St. John's Evangelical Lutheran Church (Latvian: Saldus Sv. Jāņa Evaņģēliski luteriskā draudze), in Saldus, Latvia, was officially dedicated on August 27, 1900, after a long history of use and centuries of reconstruction.

== History ==
The first wooden church was built in 1461. The second, also made of wood, was built in 1530 and then renovated in 1567. The masonry church was built between 1614 and 1615 and financed by Wilhelm Duke.

The fifth church in Saldus was built in 1737 on the hill where the present church stands. It was reconstructed in 1825. In 1898 the old church was torn down. Architect Wilhelm Neumann designed the church. Construction took place from 1898 to 1899 and cost 19,700 rubles. The completed church was named in honor of St. John. (Wilhelm Neumann also designed the Latvian National Museum of Art and the Jaunsvente Manor.)

The church was reconstructed in 1938 for a sum of 15,000 lats. The artist Ansis Bērziņš led the renovation of the interior and furnishings.

The retreating German army bombed the church tower in 1944. The roof was also damaged. A temporary wooden tower was built in 1945–1946.

Demolition of the temporary tower began on June 13, 1981, and the construction of the new tower began ten days later. Saldus architect Edgars Krūmiņš designed the tower and V. Krivans made the rooster at the top of the spire. The renovated church was dedicated on August 1, 1982. The underground tombs were opened and researched during a renovation in 1995, when heated flooring was installed. The church facade was renovated in 2006.
