= Saldus =

Town and capital of Saldus Municipality, Latvia

- Town
- Saldus
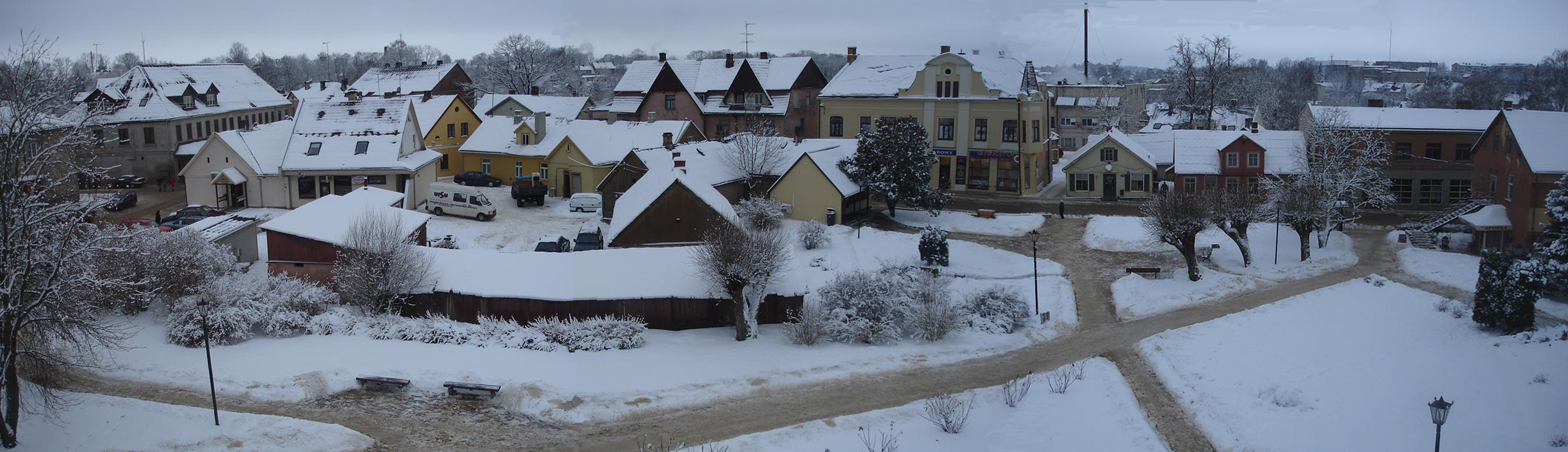

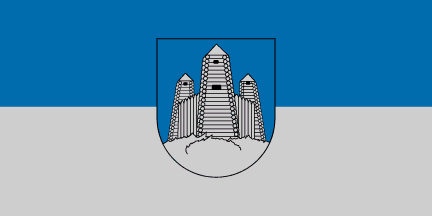
- Flag Coat of arms
- Nickname: Medus piliens Kurzemē 'A drop of honey in Courland'
- Location in Latvia
- Coordinates: 56°40′N 22°30′E
- Country: Latvia
- Municipality: Saldus Municipality
- Town rights: 1917

Government
  - Mayor: Māris Zusts
  - City council: 11 members

Area
  - Total: 10.11 km^{2} (3.90 sq mi)
  - Land: 9.68 km^{2} (3.74 sq mi)
  - Water: 0.43 km^{2} (0.17 sq mi)

Population (2019)
  - Total: 9,553
  - Density: 987/km^{2} (2,560/sq mi)
- Time zone: UTC+2 (EET)
  - Summer (DST): UTC+3 (EEST)
- Postal code: LV-3801
- Calling code: +371 638
- Climate: Dfb
- Website: https://www.saldus.lv/

Saldus (German: Frauenburg, Yiddish: פֿרויענבורג, romanized: Froienburg) is a Latvian town and the center of Saldus Municipality, located in the Courland (Latvian: Kurzeme) region. The name Saldus has been noted in historical sources as far back as the mid-13th century, but the founding year for the establishment of the town is considered to be 1856, with the settlement gaining town rights in 1917.

The town is located in between Riga and Liepāja (slightly closer to Liepāja (100 km) than Riga (119 km). The Ciecere River flows through Saldus, and it is a tributary to one of Latvia’s biggest rivers, the Venta.

The city is often referred to as "the Bowl of Courland" because of a famous quote by Māris Čaklais: "A drop of honey in the bowl of Courland". The reasoning behind the quote is the fact that from a high point, the city looks like a crater.

As of January 2025, Saldus is the 18th-largest city in Latvia according to population data. In 2025, the town had a population of 9,553.

== History ==
=== Early history ===
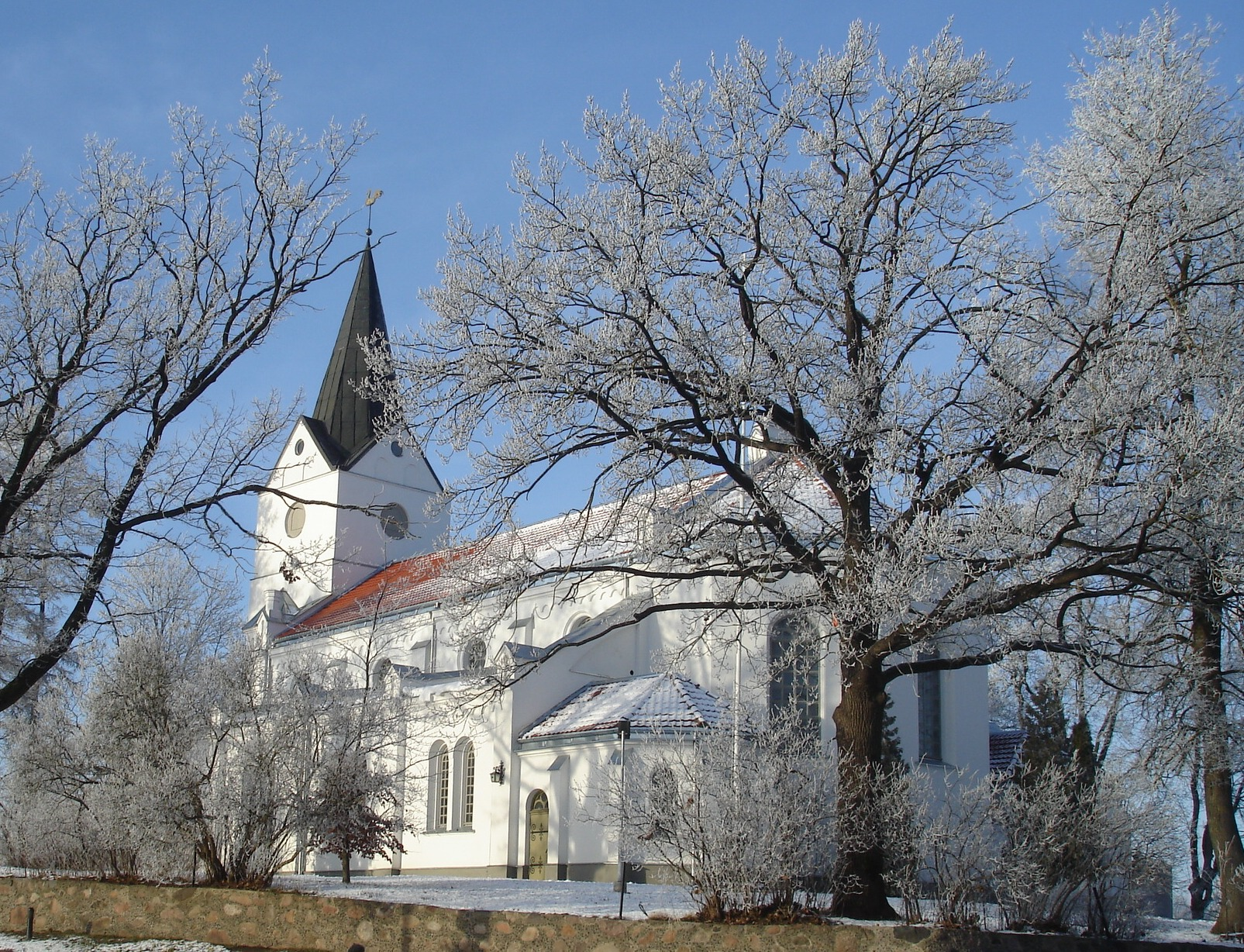
St. John's Church in Saldus

According to archeological research, the whole territory that is now Saldus was inhabited by the Baltic tribe Couronians in the 20th century BC. The centre of defence at the time, Saldus Castle, was located by Lake Saldus until the 13th century,

1856 is considered the year Saldus was founded, when the Board of Domens decided to establish a trade center. Although there was an active economy by the end of the 19th century, and Saldus was the cultural center of the region, it was not officially recognized as a town until 1917.

One of the oldest buildings in the town is Saldus St.John's church. Documents from 1461 mention a wooden church. It has been reconstructed several times. The tower, bombed in 1944, was rebuilt in 1981–82.

=== World War II ===
Prior to invasion by the Nazis, Saldus had a large Jewish population. Nazi troops entered the city on 29 June 1941, and subsequently arrested around 100 Jewish men from the population, who were later shot and killed in the Veide forest, around 1 km from Saldus. Following the initial arrests, around 200 more were imprisoned in the local synagogue and prison, where they were transported to Baltezers Lake (4 km from Saldus) and shot by Sicherheitsdienst, helped by local non-Jewish residents.

== Economy ==
Saldus has developed itself as an important cultural, educational, business and trade center. There are about 500 approved companies operating in Saldus, with main branches in building construction, wood processing, and food processing.

These days Saldus also boasts an active cultural life -featuring local musicians, poets, painters, and artists.

== Hymn ==
The official hymn of the city, written by Ēriks Ķiģelis and Māris Čaklais, is ‘’Saldus saule’’ (English: Saldus Sun).

On 18 November 2018, 32 years since its release in 1986, the song was finally publicly acknowledged as the official hymn.

Lyrics

Rudenī viņa kā rupjmaize
Siltiem gabaliem laužama,
Ziemā kabatā sildītu
Es viņu kā burkānu graužu.

Vasarā bērniem galviņas
Viņa tik blīvi pieglāsta,
Kad atnāk kārta gaidīšanai
Kļūst tik pavasara viegla.

Sauli, ko vienreiz var iegūt,
Sauli, ko nevar vairs zaudēt,
Uz sauli, ko vienreiz var iegūt,
Uz sauli, ko nevar vairs zaudēt.

Pāri Kalnsētas kokiem austoša,
Visur līdzi man bijusi.
Mana zelta kontrabanda,
Mana kabatas baterija.

2x
Saule, ko vienreiz var zaudēt.
Saule, ko nevar vairs iegūt.
Saule, ko vienreiz var zaudēt.
Saule, ko nevar vairs iegūt.

== Education ==
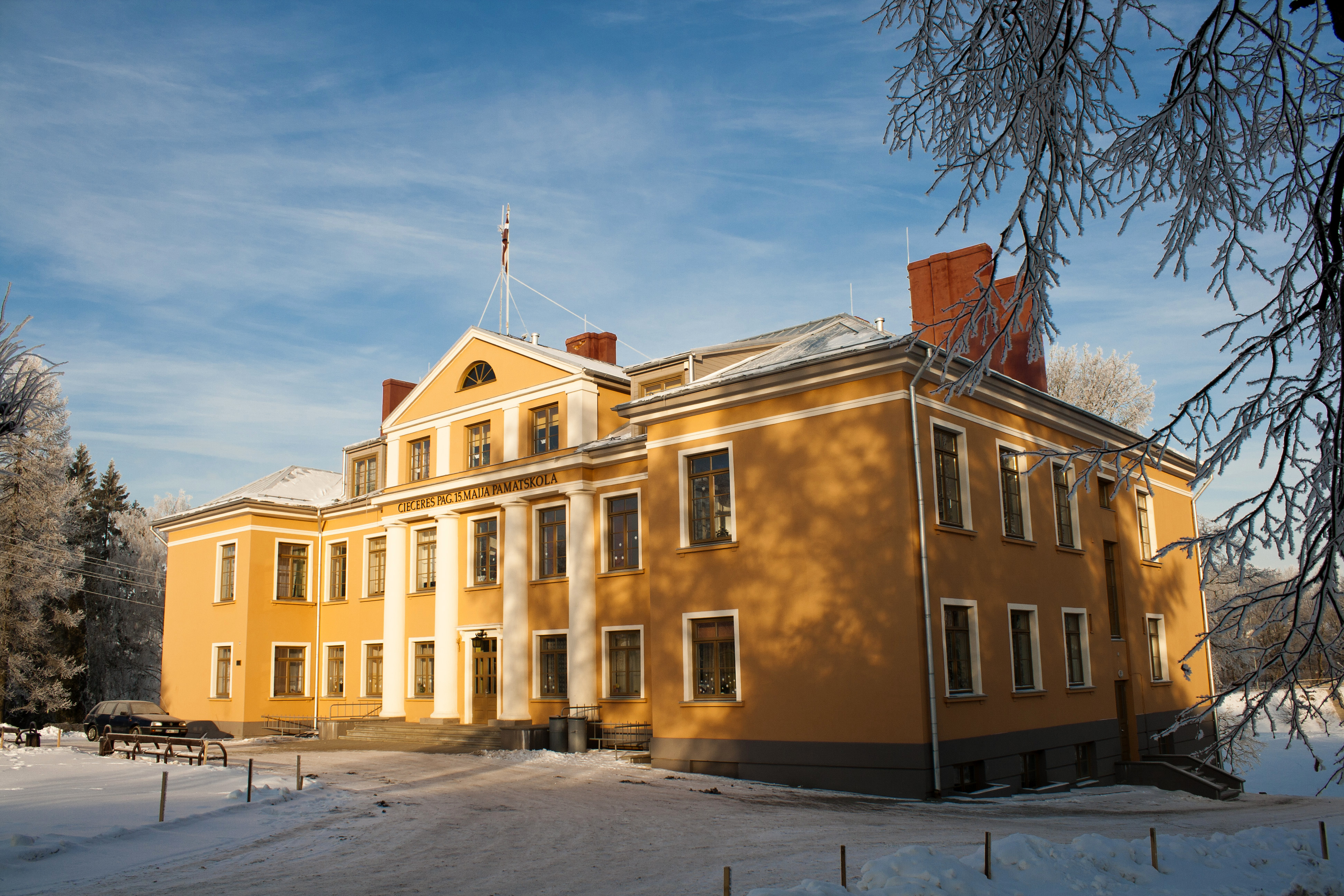
Ciecere Primary School in Saldus

Saldus has been home to the Saldus School of Music since 1946. In 1984, Saldus Art School was founded.

On 22 March 2013 the Saldus Art School moved to a newly built building.

Up until 2016, there were 2 high schools in the city: Saldus Gymnasium (ex 1.st High School) and Saldus Secondary High School. Saldus Gymnasium was terminated and never started the school year in 2016. Saldus Secondary High School was re-named Saldus High School.

=== Educational institutions ===
- 6 Pre-school educational institutions
- 3 Primary Schools
- Saldus High School
- Vocational High School
- Saldus Art and Music School

== Culture and contemporary life ==
=== Concerts ===
==== Saldus Saule festival ====
Yearly Rock festival 'Saldus Saule' makes Saldus a well known city in and around Latvia. The first "Saldus saule" took place in 1987. But the idea and concept were conceived earlier.

3 October 1985 saw the death of a beloved musician - Ēriks Ķiģelis. The twenty-somethings of that time wanted to keep his memory alive and so the festival was born. Due to the USSR regime, the festival could not be named after Ēriks Ķiģelis.

The first festival was first organized by famous music sociologist Juris Vilcāns and Ēriks Niedra.

== Geography ==
Saldus is geographically located in the ‘Austrumkursas’ Highlands. It is the biggest city in the Highlands. The city was built on both shores of the river ‘Ciecere’ and on the east side of the city lies ‘Saldus lake’. The city is considered to be one of the greenest cities in Latvia, due to being characterized with parks, squares and bountiful greenery.

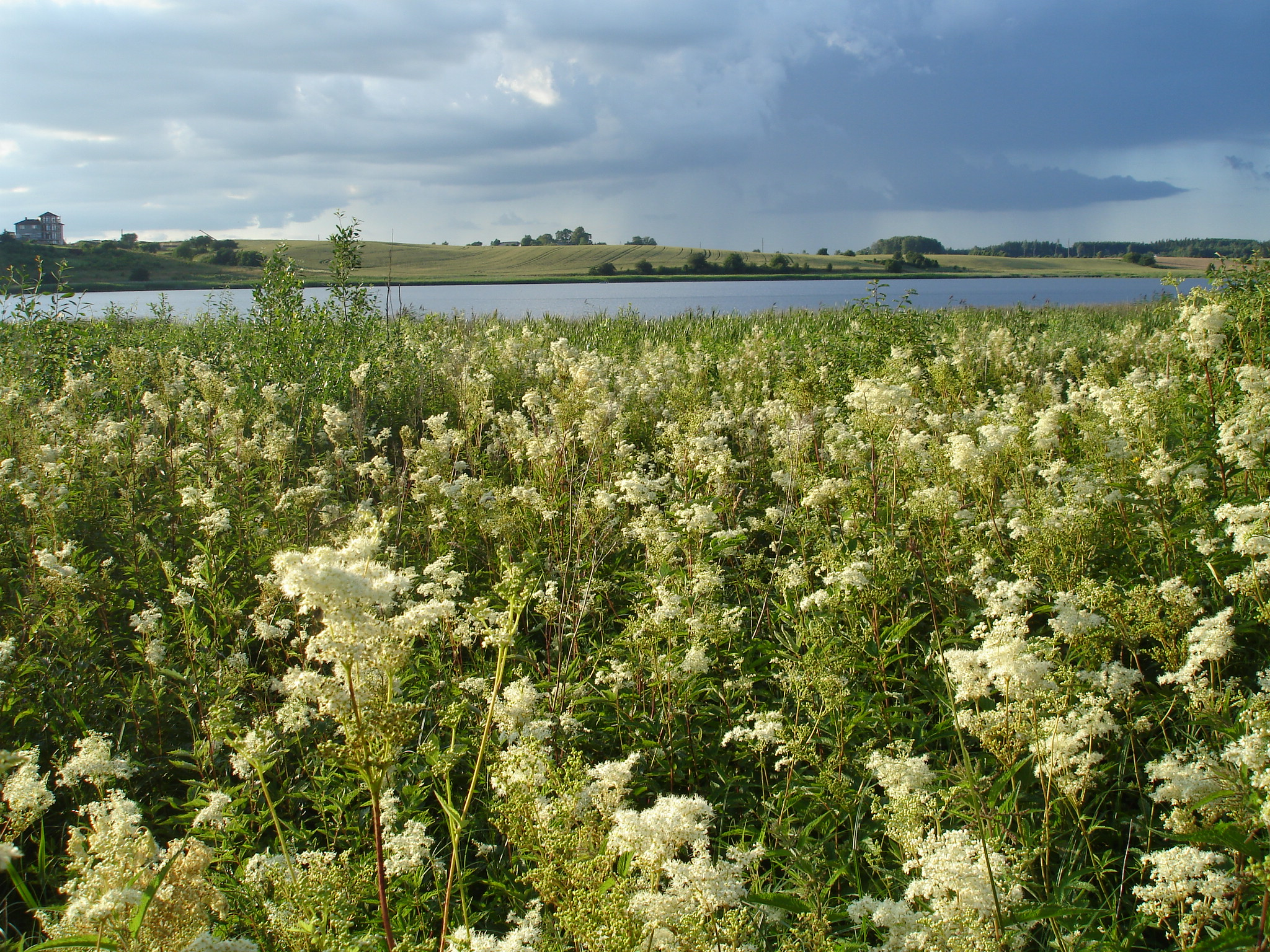
Saldus Lake

There are many tiny rivers, that flowing through Saldus, but only one important one. Interestingly other rivers are also named.

=== Saldus Lake ===
The lake lies north-east of the city, on the edge of the city. The lake’s north-west and south-east shores are incredibly steep. The lake has an estuary – Vēršāda (a tributary from river, and a tributary – Kaļķupīte. The deepest point is 5 m. On the south-west shore there is an artificial beach.

=== River Ciecere ===
River Ciecere is a 51 km long right-bank tributary to river Venta. The river itself has 52 tributaries. It flows out from Lake Ciecere and for 6 km flows through Saldus, creating a very rich green-zone in the city center. The river has 14 crossing bridges. In Saldus there are a few artificial waterfalls. There are nature-walks along the river bank. In the 17th century, the river was navigable by ship and boat.

=== Climate ===
Saldus has a humid continental climate (Köppen Dfb).

Climate data for Saldus (1991-2020 normals, extremes 1945–present)
Month	Jan	Feb	Mar	Apr	May	Jun	Jul	Aug	Sep	Oct	Nov	Dec	Year
Record high °C (°F)	9.4 (48.9)	12.2 (54.0)	18.8 (65.8)	27.1 (80.8)	29.6 (85.3)	32.4 (90.3)	34.3 (93.7)	33.1 (91.6)	29.4 (84.9)	23.8 (74.8)	16.8 (62.2)	11.6 (52.9)	34.3 (93.7)
Mean daily maximum °C (°F)	−0.5 (31.1)	−0.1 (31.8)	4.1 (39.4)	11.5 (52.7)	17.1 (62.8)	20.3 (68.5)	22.9 (73.2)	22.0 (71.6)	16.9 (62.4)	10.2 (50.4)	4.5 (40.1)	1.0 (33.8)	10.8 (51.5)
Daily mean °C (°F)	−2.6 (27.3)	−2.7 (27.1)	0.4 (32.7)	6.2 (43.2)	11.5 (52.7)	15.0 (59.0)	17.6 (63.7)	16.7 (62.1)	12.1 (53.8)	6.8 (44.2)	2.4 (36.3)	−1.0 (30.2)	6.9 (44.4)
Mean daily minimum °C (°F)	−5.2 (22.6)	−5.5 (22.1)	−3.3 (26.1)	1.3 (34.3)	5.5 (41.9)	9.5 (49.1)	12.2 (54.0)	11.7 (53.1)	7.9 (46.2)	3.6 (38.5)	0.3 (32.5)	−3.1 (26.4)	2.9 (37.2)
Record low °C (°F)	−34.2 (−29.6)	−36.2 (−33.2)	−26.9 (−16.4)	−12.6 (9.3)	−4.0 (24.8)	−1.4 (29.5)	3.8 (38.8)	1.8 (35.2)	−4.2 (24.4)	−9.4 (15.1)	−22.5 (−8.5)	−30.5 (−22.9)	−36.2 (−33.2)
Average precipitation mm (inches)	48.9 (1.93)	37.7 (1.48)	36.8 (1.45)	35.4 (1.39)	46.8 (1.84)	62.0 (2.44)	83.5 (3.29)	76.9 (3.03)	59.4 (2.34)	68.7 (2.70)	53.3 (2.10)	53.2 (2.09)	662.6 (26.08)
Average precipitation days (≥ 1 mm)	11	9	8	8	8	9	10	10	9	11	12	12	117
Average relative humidity (%)	89.4	86.8	80.1	71.9	69.6	73.8	76.2	78.4	83.3	86.9	90.8	91.4	81.6
Source 1: LVĢMC
Source 2: NOAA (precipitation days, humidity 1991-2020)

== Demographics ==
The population of Saldus has been decreasing since the first recorded census. It declined more rapidly when moving to United Kingdom became a valid choice for the people of Latvia.

Historical population

Year	Pop.	±%
1989	12,330	—
1990	12,113	−1.8%
1991	12,469	+2.9%
1992	12,452	−0.1%
1993	12,452	+0.0%
1994	12,472	+0.2%
1995	12,540	+0.5%
1996	12,597	+0.5%
1997	12,576	−0.2%
1998	12,658	+0.7%
1999	12,660	+0.0%
2000	12,557	−0.8%
2001	12,483	−0.6%
2002	12,413	−0.6%
2003	12,365	−0.4%
2004	12,289	−0.6%

Year	Pop.	±%
2005	12,234	−0.4%
2006	12,138	−0.8%
2007	12,016	−1.0%
2008	11,987	−0.2%
2009	11,919	−0.6%
2010	11,735	−1.5%
2011	11,413	−2.7%
2012	11,217	−1.7%
2013	11,022	−1.7%
2014	10,895	−1.2%
2015	10,771	−1.1%
2016	10,627	−1.3%
2017	10,311	−3.0%
2018	10,053	−2.5%
2019 (est.)	9,937	−1.2%

Source: Central Statistical Bureau of Latvia

== Notable people ==
- Johann von Besser, (DE Wiki) (1654–1729), a German writer
- Janis Rozentāls (1866–1917), painter
- Oskars Kalpaks (1882–1919), Battalion Commander
- Lea Davidova-Medene (1921–1986), sculptor
- Māris Čaklais (1940–2003), poet, writer, and journalist.
- Ēriks Ķiģelis, (LV Wiki) (1955–1985), musician, guitarist
- Rinalds Grants (born 1974), Lutheran bishop, primate of the Evangelical Lutheran Church of Latvia
- Ieva Laguna (born 1990), top model

=== Sport ===
- Ursula Donath (1931–2026), German athlete, bronze medallist in the 800 meters at the 1960 Summer Olympics
- Jānis Blūms (born 1982), basketball player, captain of the national team
- Gints Freimanis (1985–2023), footballer who played 310 games and 13 for Latvia
- Uģis Žaļims (born 1986), bobsledder
- Madars Razma (born 1988), darts player, lives in Saldus
- Gunārs Skvorcovs (born 1990), ice hockey player

== International relations ==
=== Twin towns – Sister cities ===
Saldus is twinned with:

- Paide, Estonia
- Mažeikiai, Lithuania
- Šilutė, Lithuania
- Liederbach am Taunus, Germany
- Lidingö, Sweden
- Stargard, Poland
- Sergiyev Posad, Russia
- Villebon-sur-Yvette, France
- Sankt Andrä, Austria
- Las Rozas Del Madrid, Spain
- Volda, Norway
- (Georgia (country)) Tsqaltubo, Georgia
- Florești, Moldova

== See also ==
- List of cities in Latvia
- Janis Rozentāls

== Gallery ==
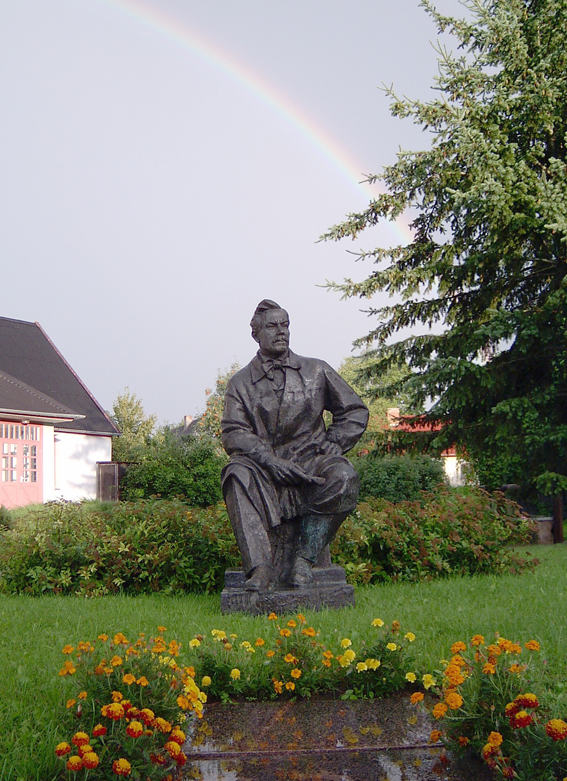
Monument of Janis Rozentāls

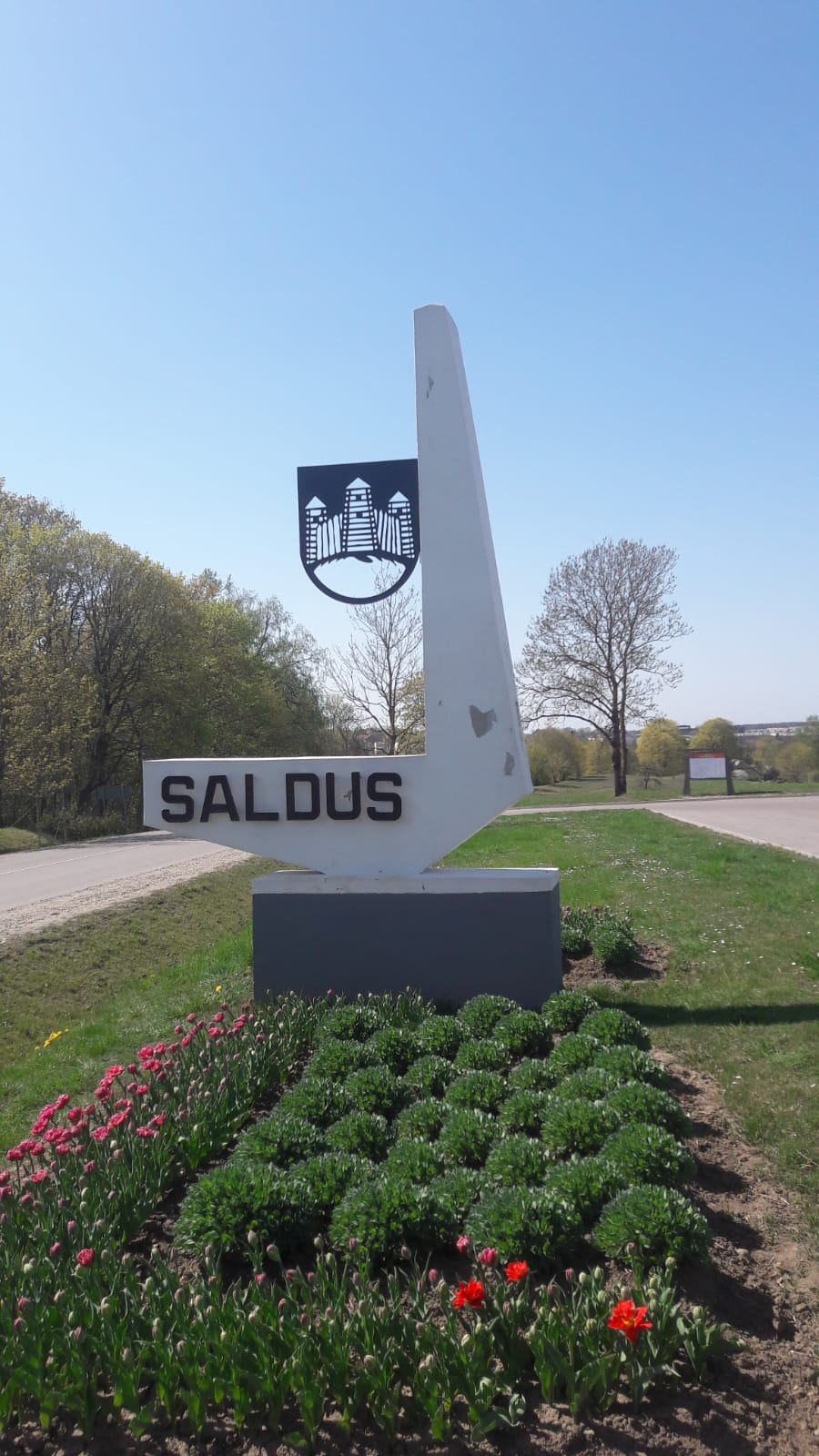
Saldus Sign

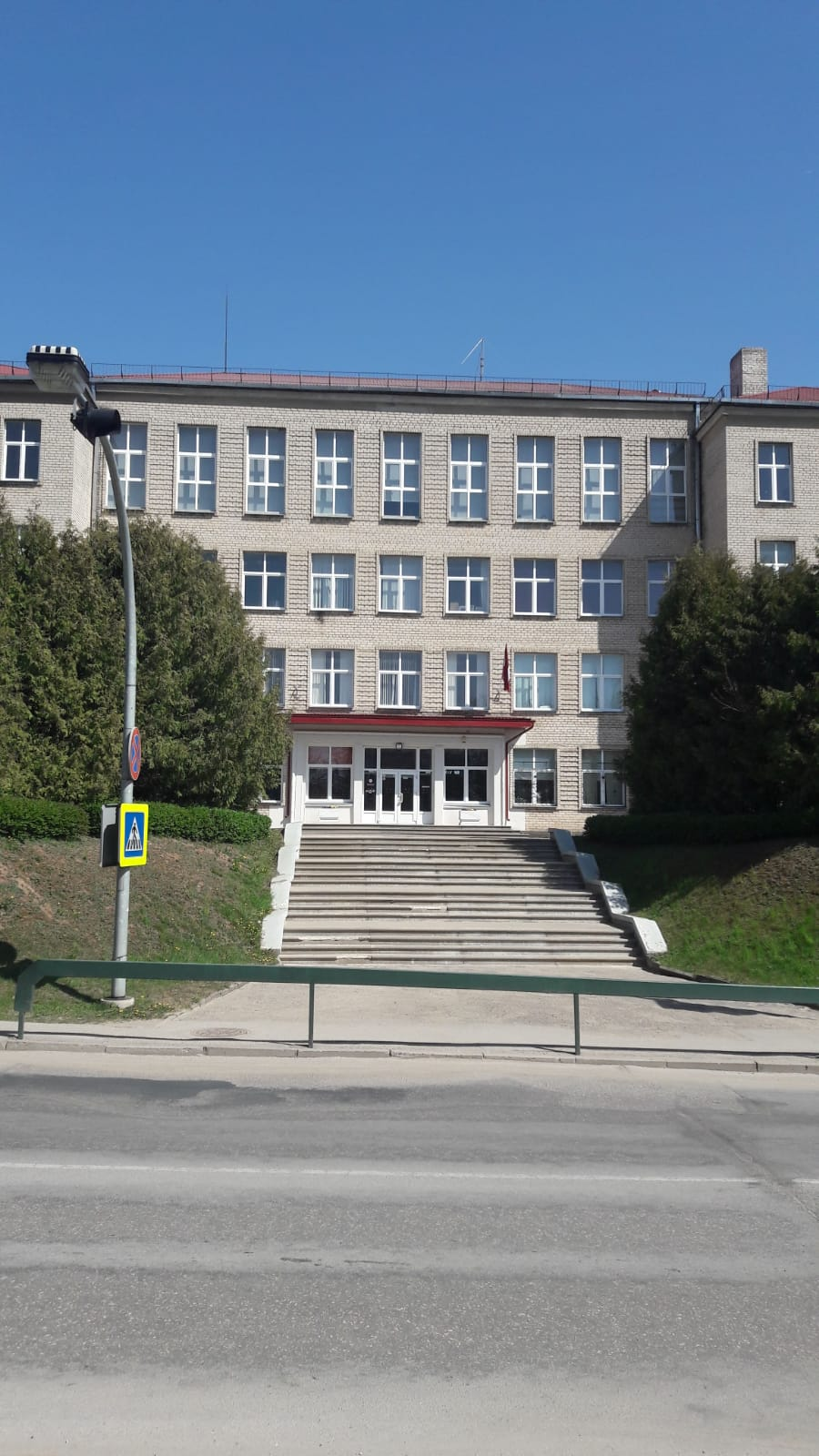
The Old City Gymnasium

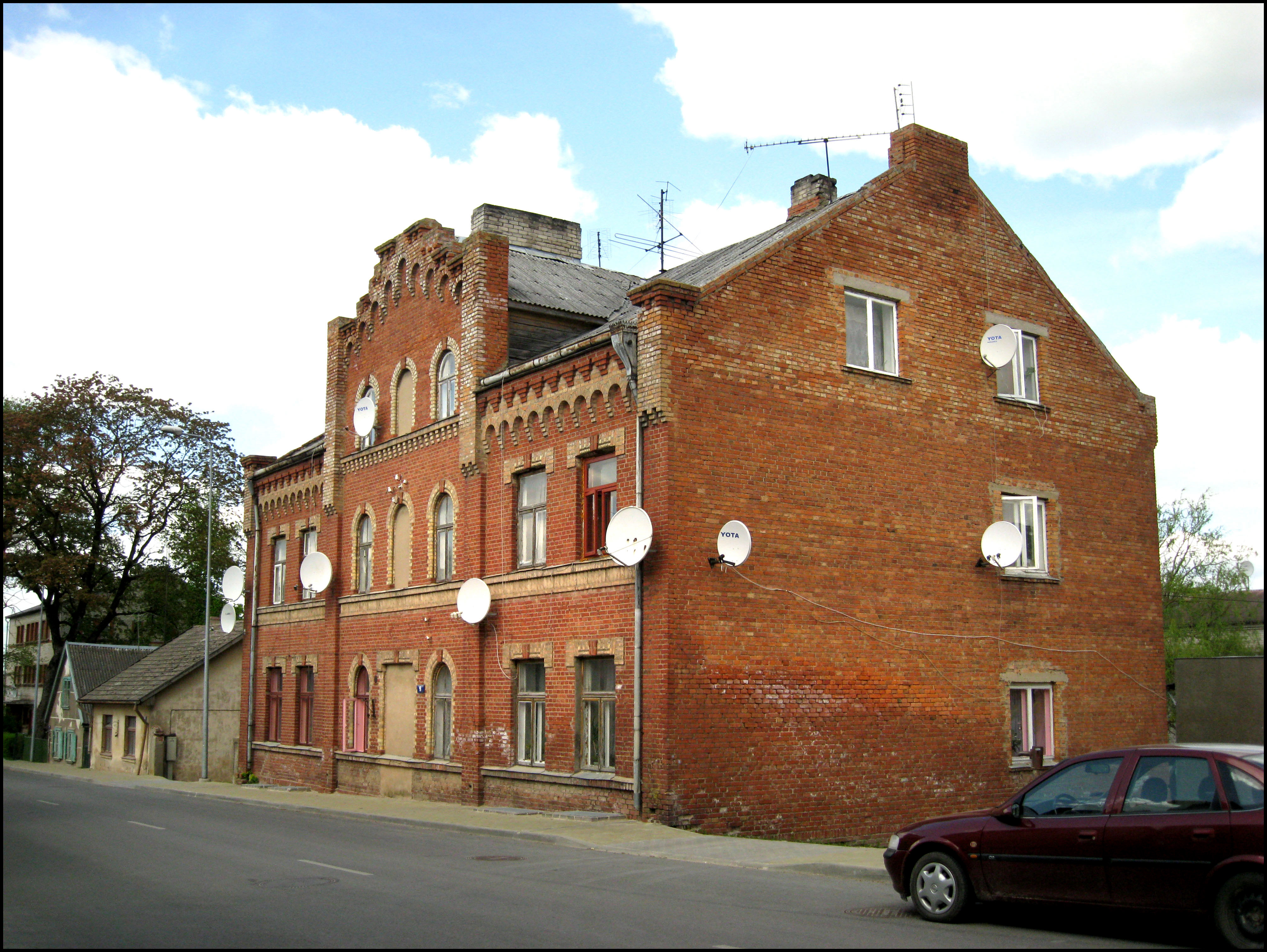
House of Fire Insurance Association

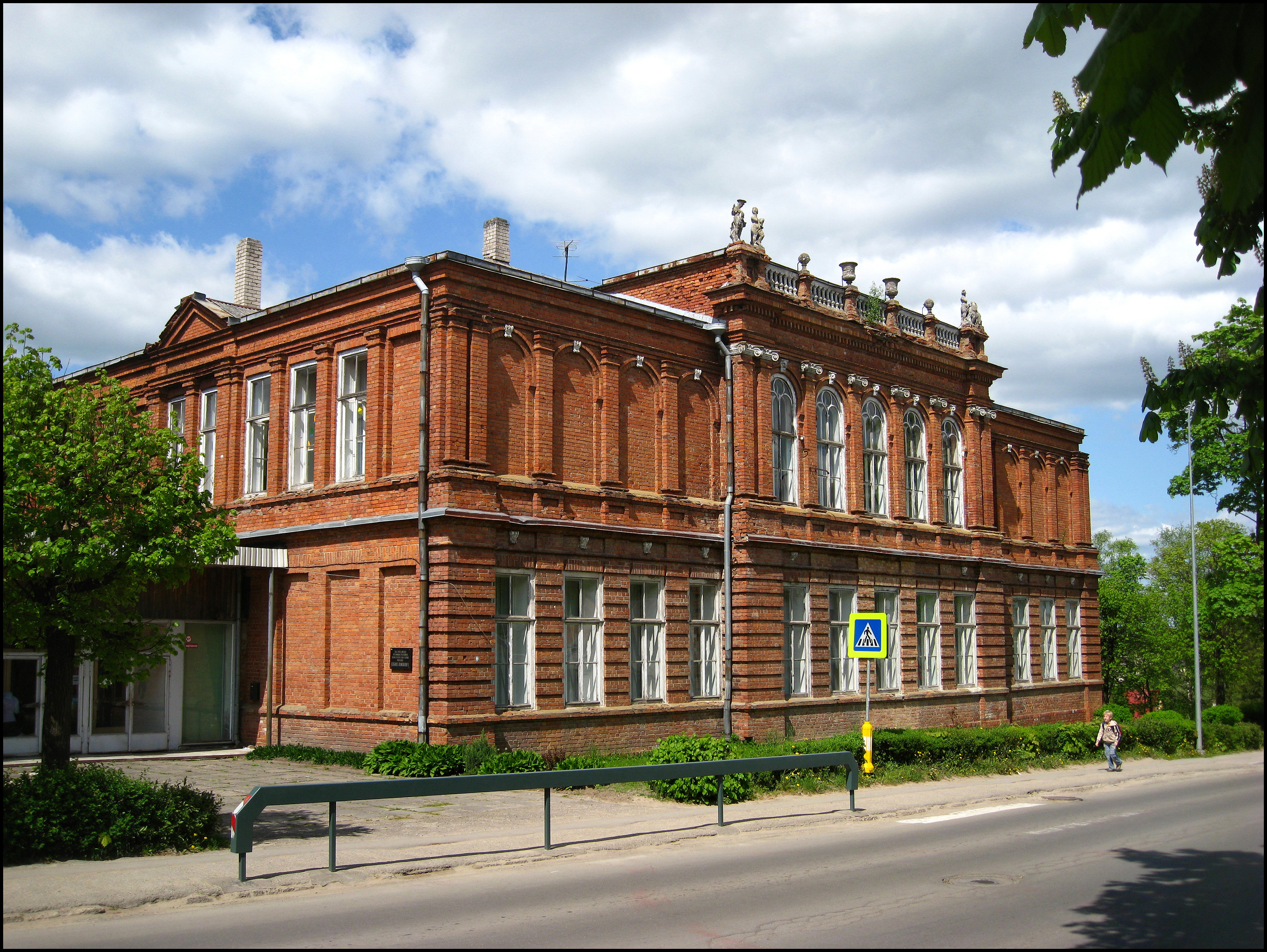
Saldus Elementary School

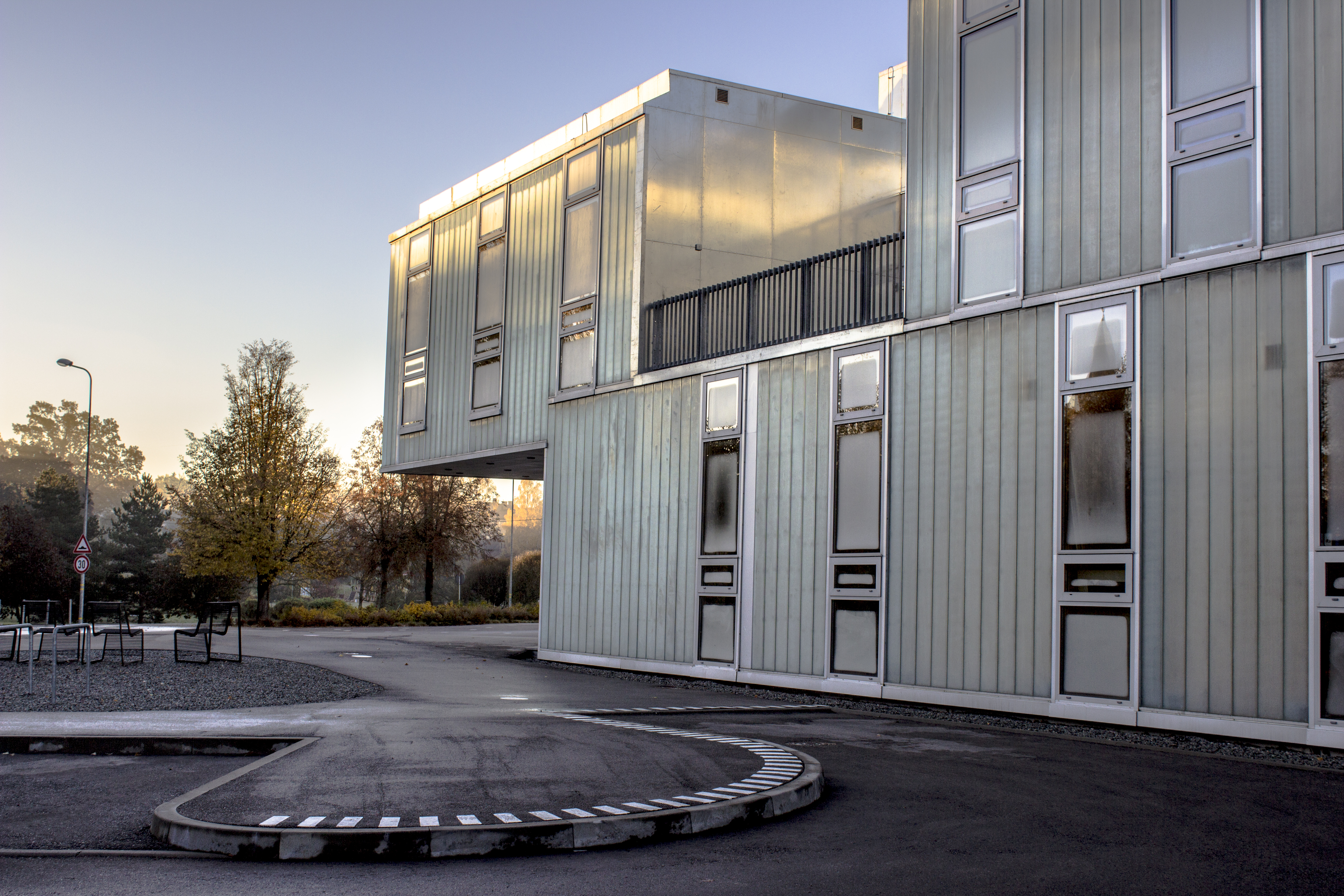
Saldus School of Music and Art

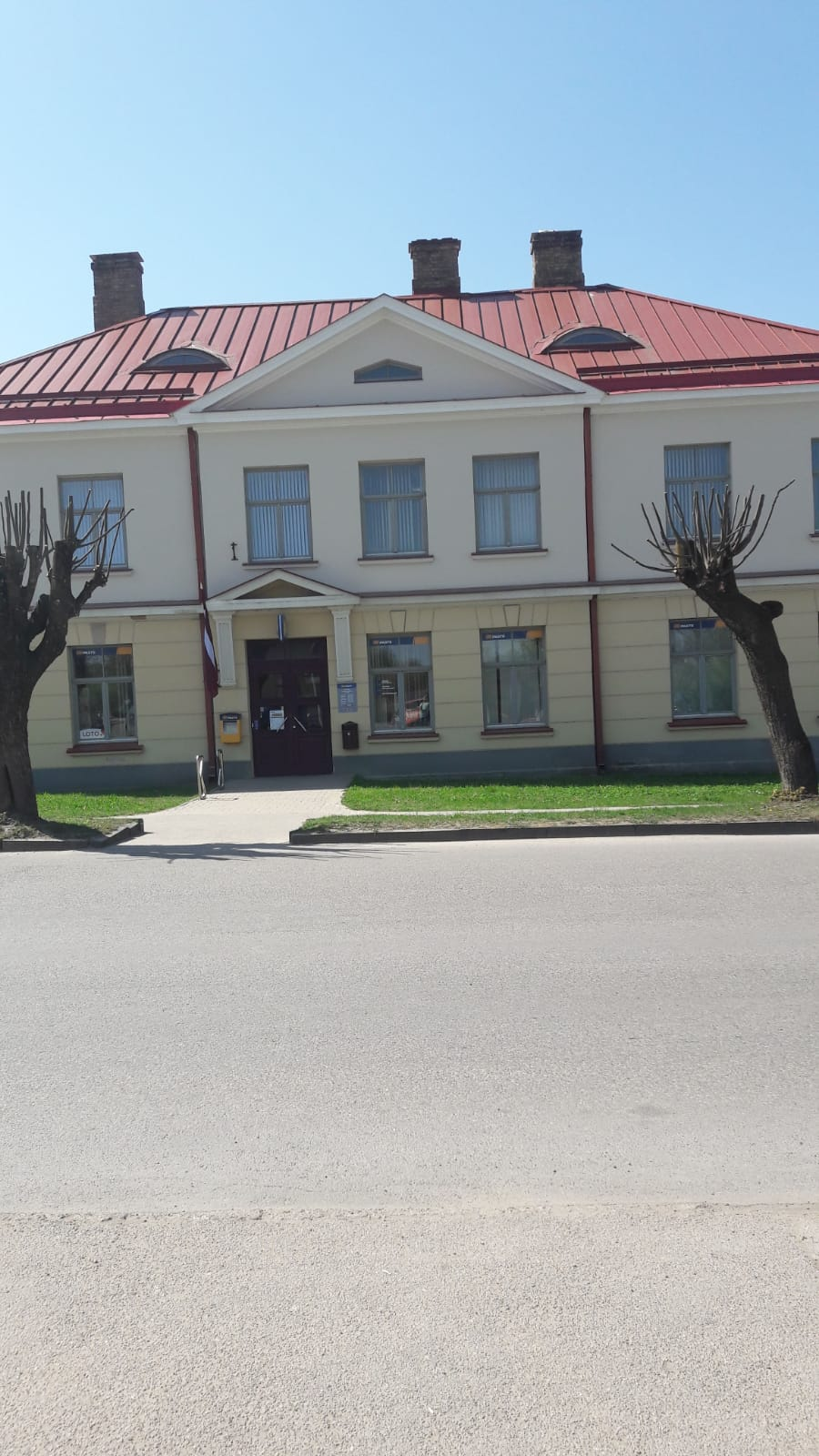
Saldus Post Office

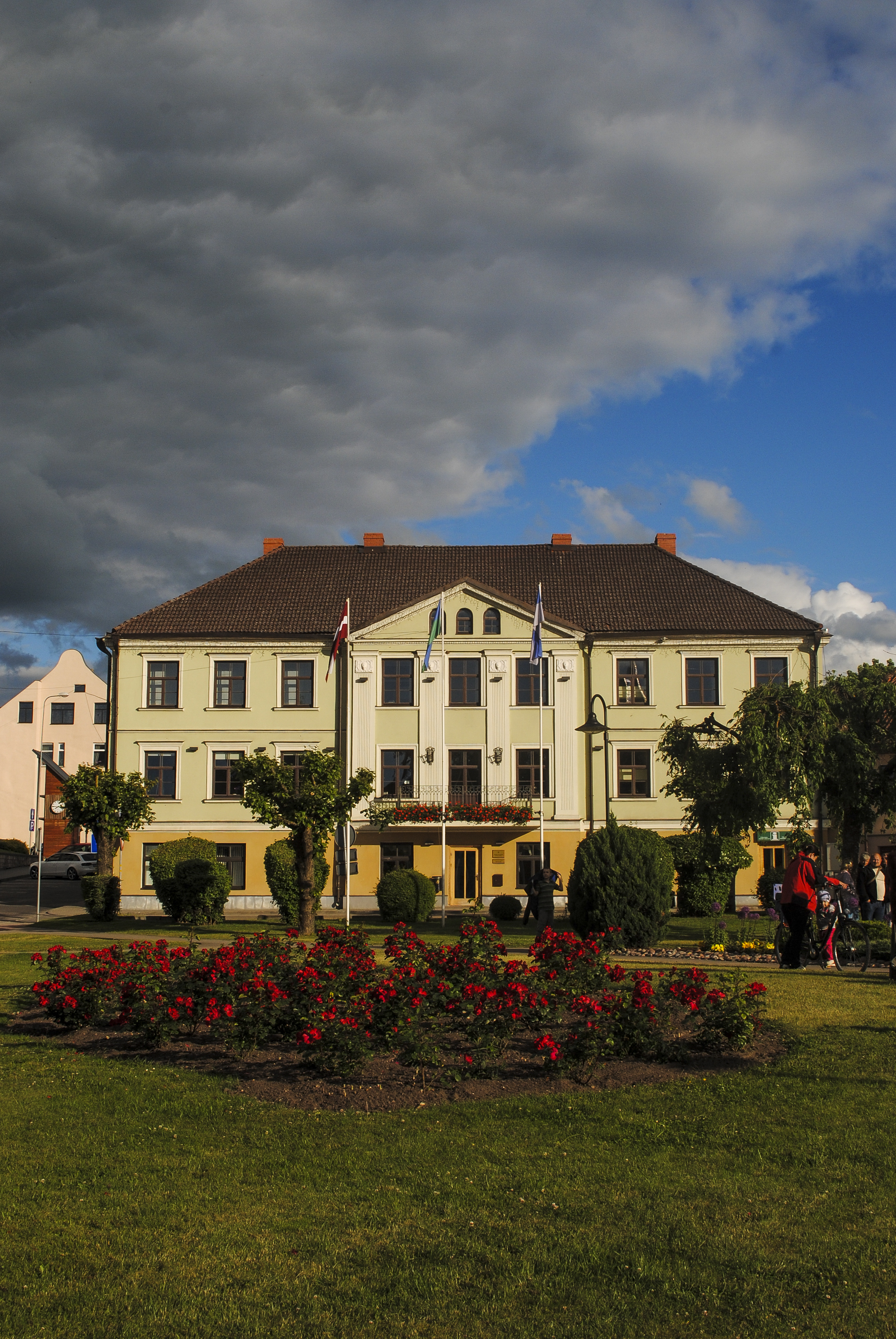
Saldus city historical center
