= Svente Parish =

Parish of Latvia

- parish of Latvia
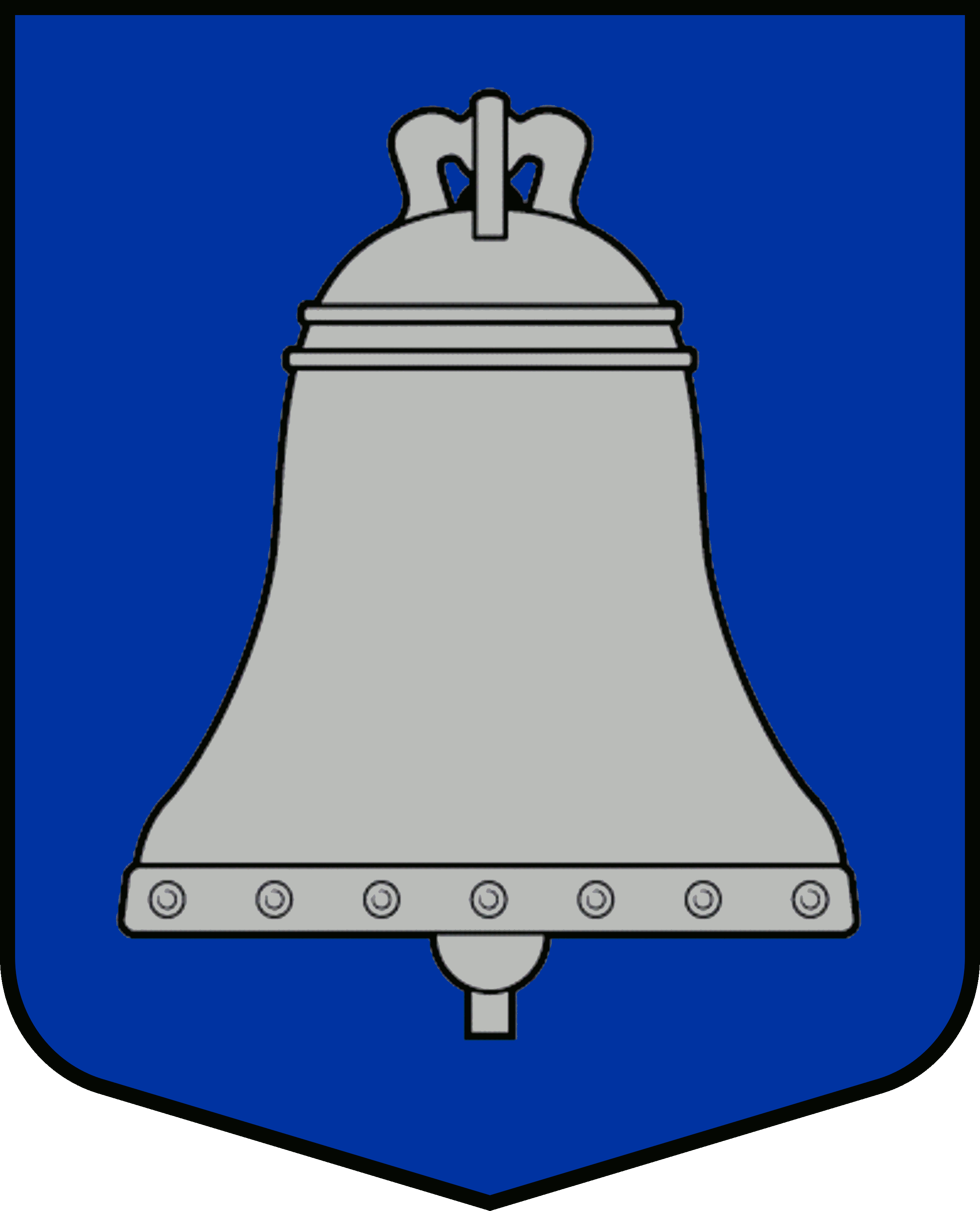
- Coat of arms

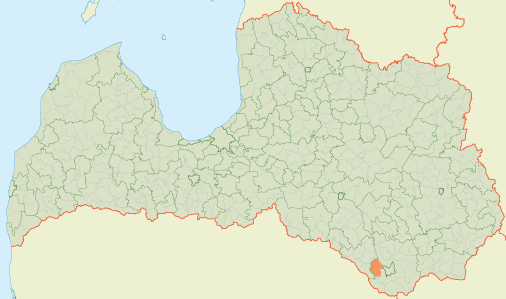
- Coordinates: 55°54′35″N 26°21′08″E
- Country: Latvia

Population (1 January 2026)
  - Total: 792
- Time zone: Eastern European Time
- Website: http://www.svente.lv

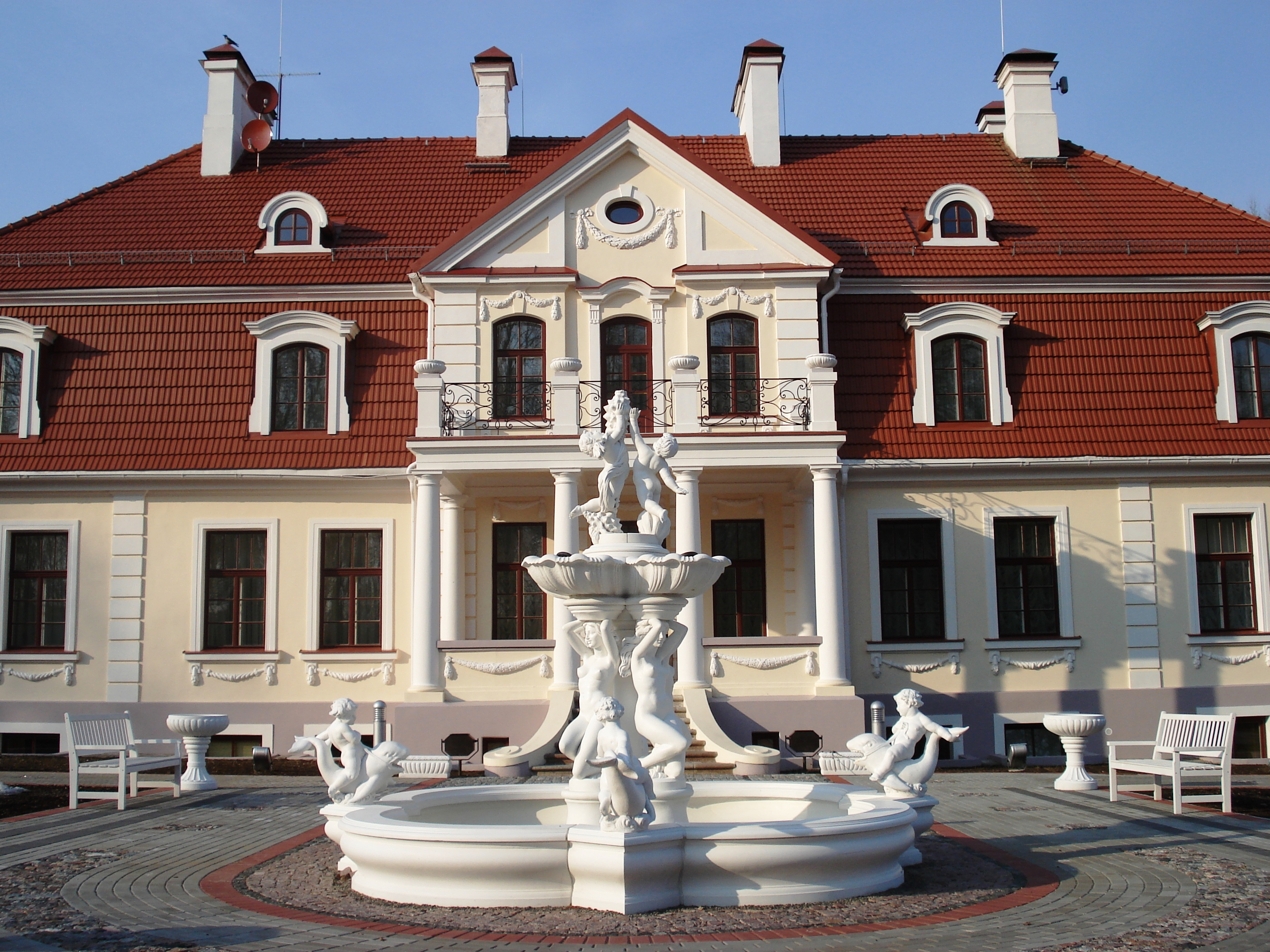
Svente manor house

Svente Parish (Latvian: Sventes pagasts) is an administrative unit of Augšdaugava Municipality in the Selonia region of Latvia. In 2011, the Polish-speaking minority formed the largest ethnic group in the parish, but by 2020, the proportion of ethnic Poles had fallen to 29 percent, slightly below that of ethnic Latvians. Russians form the third-largest ethnic group, and, as of 2021, Russian is the most widely spoken language in the parish.

== Towns, villages and settlements of Svente Parish ==
- Šiškova

== See also ==
- Svente Manor
