= Princess with a Monkey =

1913 painting by Janis Rozentāls

- Princese ar pērtiķi (Latvian)
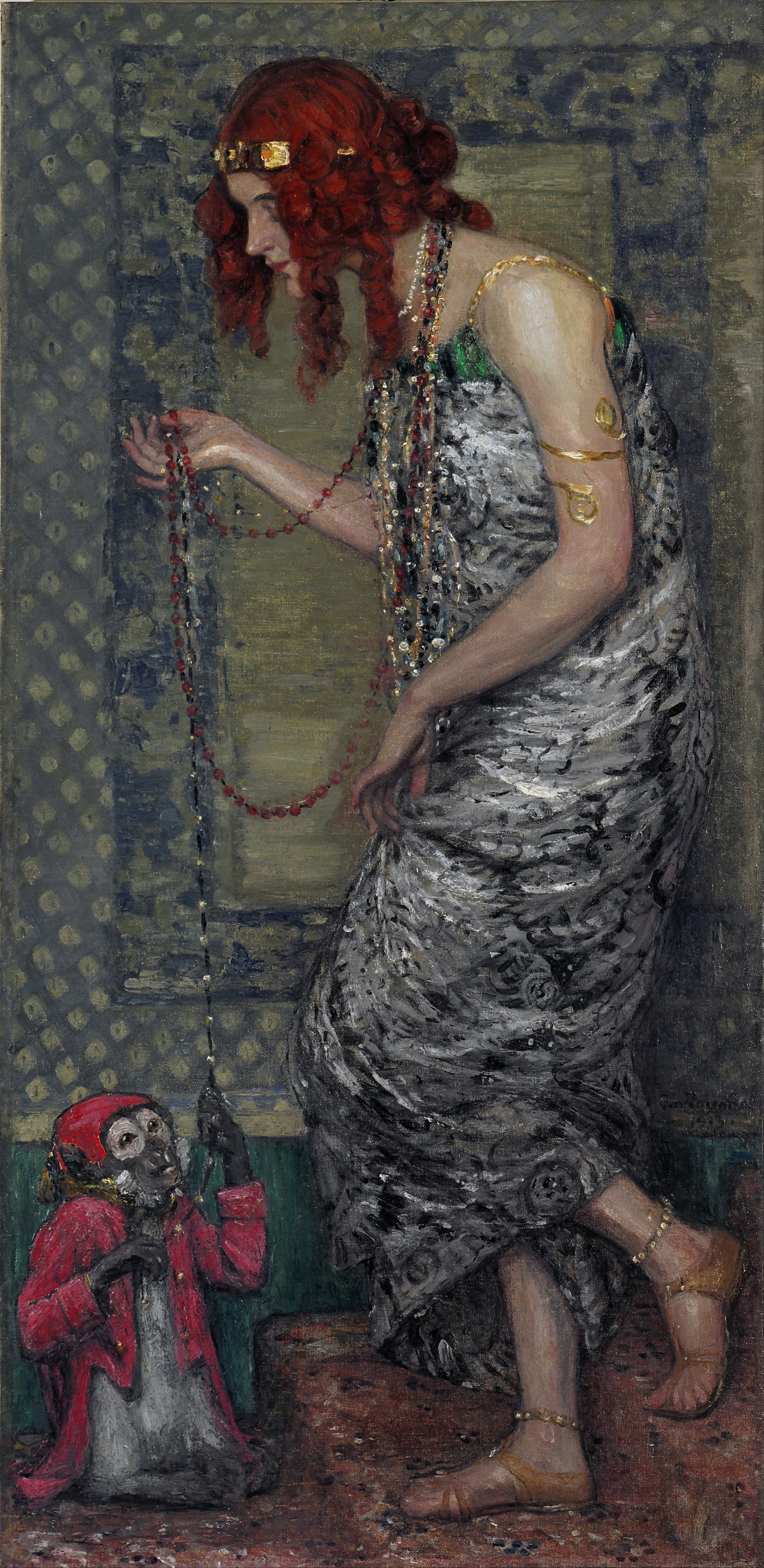
- Artist: Janis Rozentāls
- Year: 1913
- Medium: oil on canvas
- Dimensions: 145.5 cm × 69.5 cm (57.3 in × 27.4 in)
- Location: Latvian National Museum of Art; Riga

Princess with a Monkey (Latvian: Princese ar pērtiķi) is a 1913 painting by Janis Rozentāls.

== Description ==
Princess with a Monkey reflects a theme Rozentāls returned to repeatedly in the last years of his life. Some interpretations see the painting as an allegory of the relationship between an artist and society reflecting the power of money over the artist. Or perhaps the princess is ‘great, beautiful art’ and the monkey the artist: her servant and plaything, bound by golden chains. Rozentāls’ work included graphic art and in 1910 he worked on the decorative frieze of the newly built headquarters of the Riga Latvian Society. The painting is oil on canvas, with dimensions 145.5 x 69.5 centimeters. It is located in the Latvian National Museum of Art, in Riga.
