= Lea Davidova-Medene =

Latvian sculptor (1921–1986)

- Born: 31 March 1921; Sātiņu Parish, Latvia
- Died: 31 July 1986 (aged 65); Riga, Latvia
- Known for: Sculpture
- Movement: Modernism, Constructivism, Cubism

Lea Davidova-Medene (Latvian: Lea Davidova-Medene); (31 March 1921 – 31 July 1986) was a Latvian sculptor who worked within the portrait genre in Latvian sculpture during the second half of the 20th century.

== Biography ==
Lea Davidova-Medene graduated from the Art Academy of Latvia’s Sculpture Department in 1949 under the guidance of sculptor Teodors Zaļkalns. Davidova-Medene started her artistic career shortly before the advent of the so-called “harsh style”. Her exhibitions showcased a large number of portraits of workers, leaders and working heroes as well as notable cultural personalities. She not only portrayed exemplary workers but also distinguished artists, actors, musicians and other creative personalities. The most significant part of her creative legacy as a sculptor are her portraits of her contemporaries. In Davidova-Medene’ works, it is evident that the prevailing artistic movements of the day were synthesised with the traditions of the Latvian tradition of sculpture, which was established by her forerunners and Teodors Zaļkalns in particular. The result is manifested through clarity of form, laconic expression and tectonic order as well as a powerful psychological image of the model. Davidova-Medene’s portraits precisely reveal the most important aspects of the personality and character of their subjects. As a result, she has left a body of emotionally expressive and eloquent figures. This is most memorably manifested in her bronze portrait of painter Biruta Baumane, whose characteristic facial angle demonstrates her powerful and eloquent nature. Davidova-Medene’s 1985 monument to Krišjānis Barons now stands in Riga’s Vērmane Garden. Lea Davidova-Medene died on 31 July 1986, in Riga. She was buried at the Čāpātāju Cemetery in Saldus.

== Selected works ==
Portraits:

- "Portrait of Krišjānis Barons", 1985
- "Portrait of Emīls Melderis", 1979
- "Portrait of Lilija Ērika", 1969
- "Portrait of Roberts Antiņš", 1964
