= Janis Rozentāls =

Latvian painter

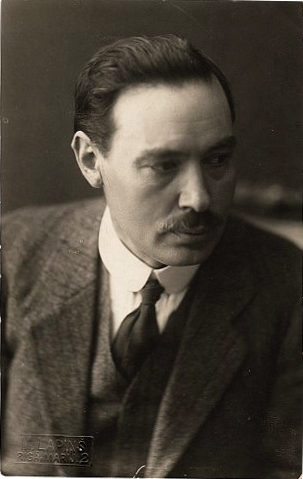
- Born: 18 March 1866; Saldus parish, Courland Governorate, Russian Empire
- Died: 26 December 1916 (aged 50); Helsinki, Grand Duchy of Finland, Russian Empire
- Known for: Painting
- Movement: Impressionism, Art Nouveau

Janis Rozentāls (March 18, 1866 – December 26, 1916) was a Latvian painter.

== Life ==
Rozentāls was born in Bebri Farmstead, Saldus parish, Courland Governorate in the Russian Empire. He was the son of a blacksmith. He received the basic education at H. Krause's Elementary School in Saldus and Kuldīga District School. At the age of fifteen he left for Riga, aiming to achieve his dream of becoming an artist, later attending Saint Petersburg Academy of Arts. During his free time the artist would visit his hometown to get away from the bustle of a large city, as well as to paint scenes of the surrounding nature and take on commissions of portraits. For his diploma works he mostly painted portraits using young Latvian students or local farmers as his subjects.

At some point the artist made the decision to settle in Saldus, wishing to live closer to his intended art subjects as well as draw inspiration from the local nature scenes. In the spring of 1899 Rozentāls acquired a plot of land on Striķu St. and built an art studio. However, his artistic aspirations were not well received in the provincial town, and he instead decided to move to the capital, Riga two years later. A memorial museum in Rozentāls' honor has been set up in the old studio built by the artist. In November of 1902, Janis Rozentāls got acquainted with Elli Forssell (1871–1943), a Finnish singer, in Riga. On February 20, 1903, the pair got married. They settled in a studio-flat, on Albert street in the capital. They later went on to have three children – Laila, Irja and Miķelis.

The start of World War I interrupted the family's peaceful life while on a stay in their villa located in Kulosaari, Helsinki during the years of 1905 to 1916.

After travelling back from an exhibition that took place in Moscow, the artist became ill and died on December 26, 1916, in his Helsinki villa. He was buried in Hietaniemi Cemetery, though in the year 1920 his body was exhumed and reburied in Forest Cemetery in Riga. In the year of 1946 the Janis Rozentāls Art Highschool in Riga was named in the artist's honor.

== Creative work ==
The scope of Rozentāls' activities was very wide, but painting was of paramount importance. He revealed the beauty of nature, demonstrated the integrity of man and nature. In Rozentāls' works the linear coexisted with the picturesque, flatness – with a soft transition of tones, small touches of paint – with vast surfaces of color. The main trait of his compositions was asymmetry, the wavelike rhythm of Art Nouveau.

Rozentāls painted many portraits. The creative potential of the artist revealed itself in the portraits of persons spiritually close to him. Rozentāls made several portraits of the patron of writers and artists A. Dombrovskis, writer Rūdolfs Blaumanis, and the artist's wife Elli Forsell.

Janis Rozentāls was interested in the biological nature of man – the world of passions, the love theme, was typical of his time. He used the popular Biblical plots "Temptation" and "Eve with the Apple", motives from the mythology and observations of the reality of his time. At least a part of the fantastic images possessed both, contemporary and local, and individual symbolic meaning.

The artist turned to landscape painting as well, and created a lyrical image of the homeland in the Latvian art. His favorite season was spring, the rebirth of Nature. Rozentāls made several altar-pieces to order in the churches of Latvia. In his altar-pieces, Rozentāls omitted the dynamics, expressiveness, texture and finished composition. He took into consideration the understanding of art of the simple people and adapted himself to it, yet at the same time he tried not to lose the artistic quality.

The artist also tried his skills in monumental painting. In the summer of 1910 he worked at the decorative frieze on the facade of the newly erected building of the Riga Latvian Society. He painted seven symbolic compositions characterizing the main activities of the society.

Painting occupied a central place in the creative activity of Rozentāls, yet his performance in graphic art was significant, too. The scope of his activity was very wide – his work encompassed the design of books and magazines, applied graphic art, posters, and drawings.

The characterization of Janis Rozentāls' personality would not be exhaustive without a review of his social activity. During his study years he took part in the life of the Academy of St. Petersburg. Later he devoted much effort to the consolidation of Latvian artists, who were neglected in their native land. He was a member of jury of almost all the biggest Latvian art exhibitions. Rozentāls took part in the organization of the exhibitions of Latvian art outside Latvia.

== Gallery ==
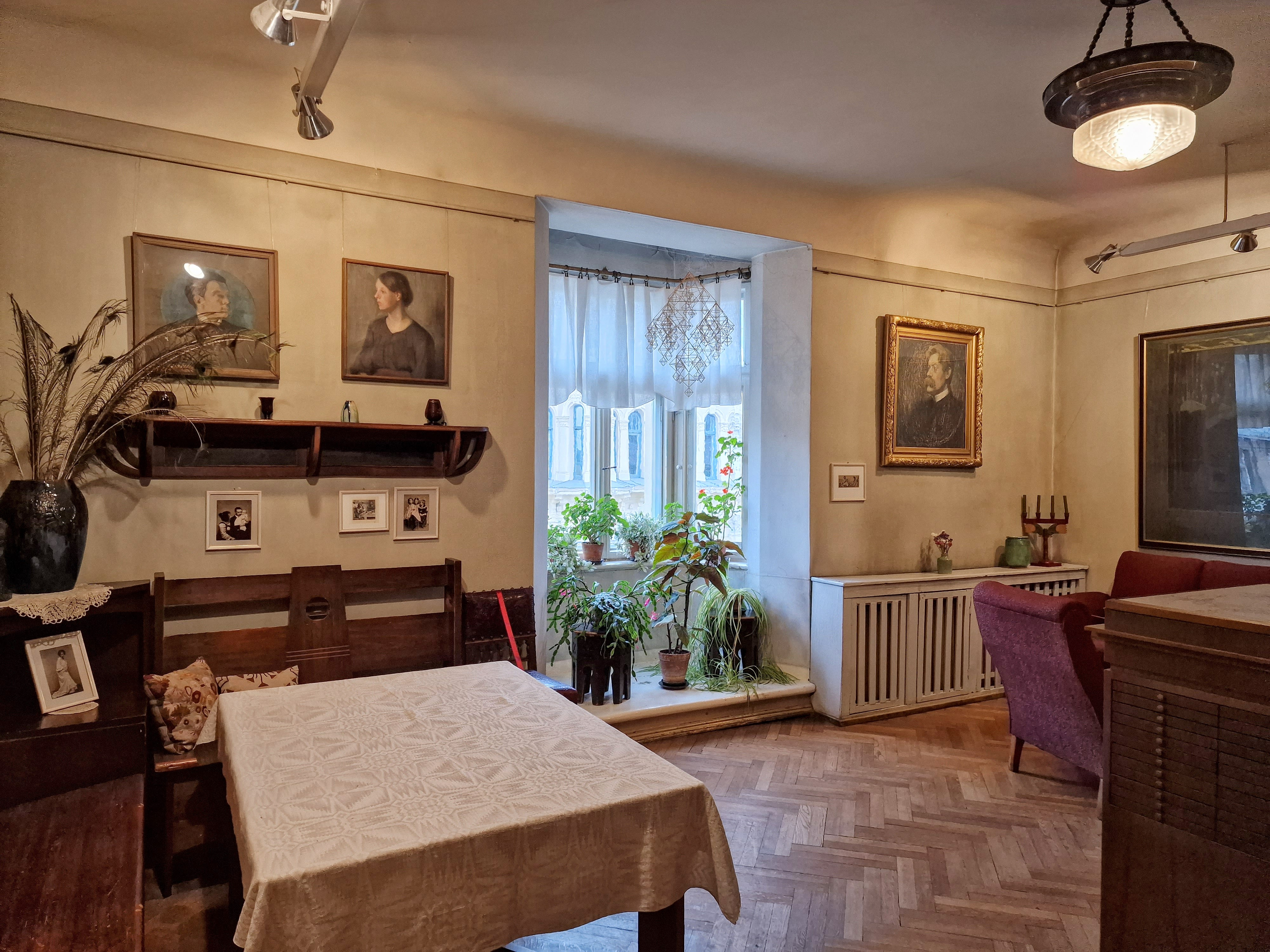
Janis Rozentāls apartment in Albert Streets 12

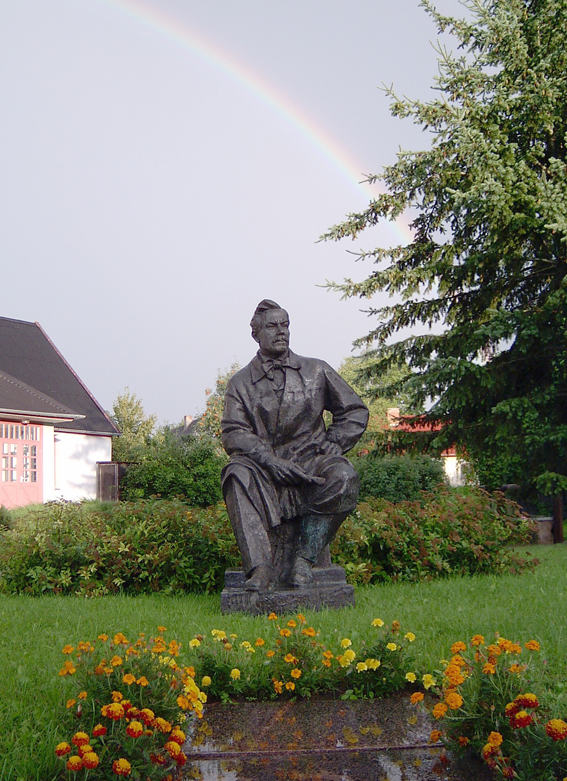
Monument of Janis Rozentāls in Saldus

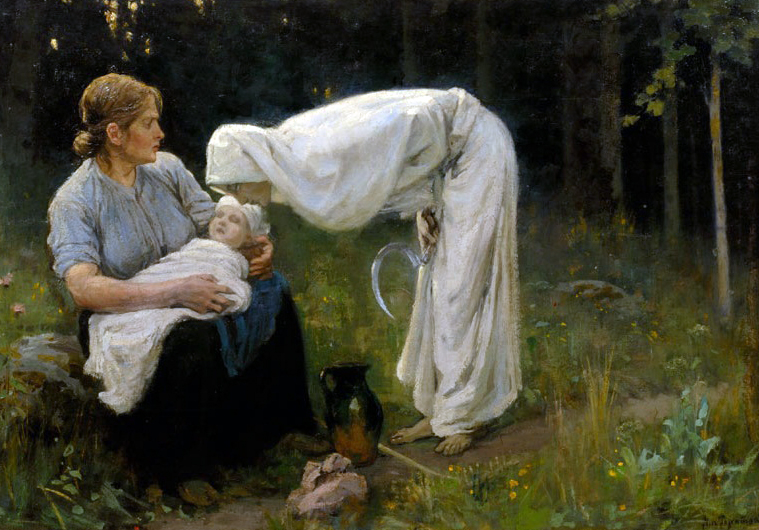
Nāve (Death) (1897)

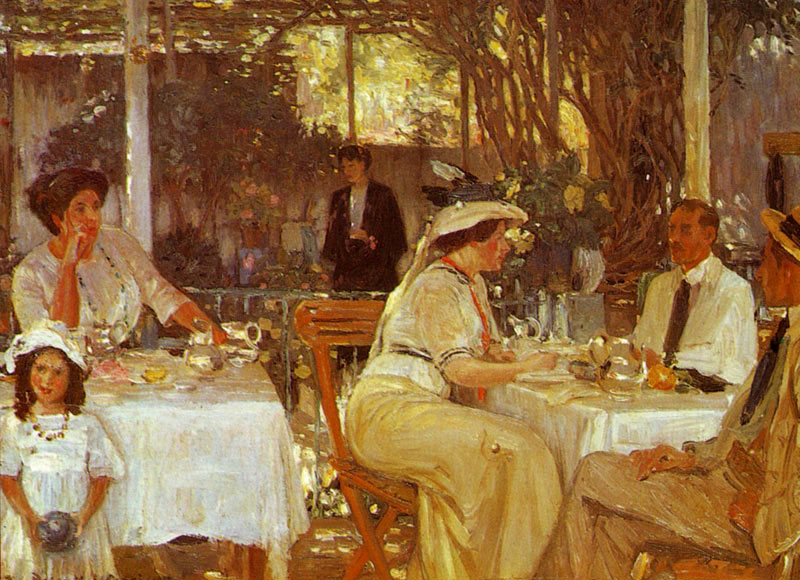
Porch in the Capri (1912)

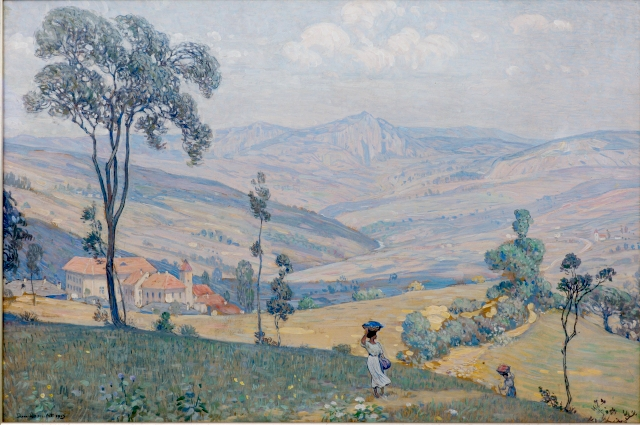
Italian Landscape (1915)

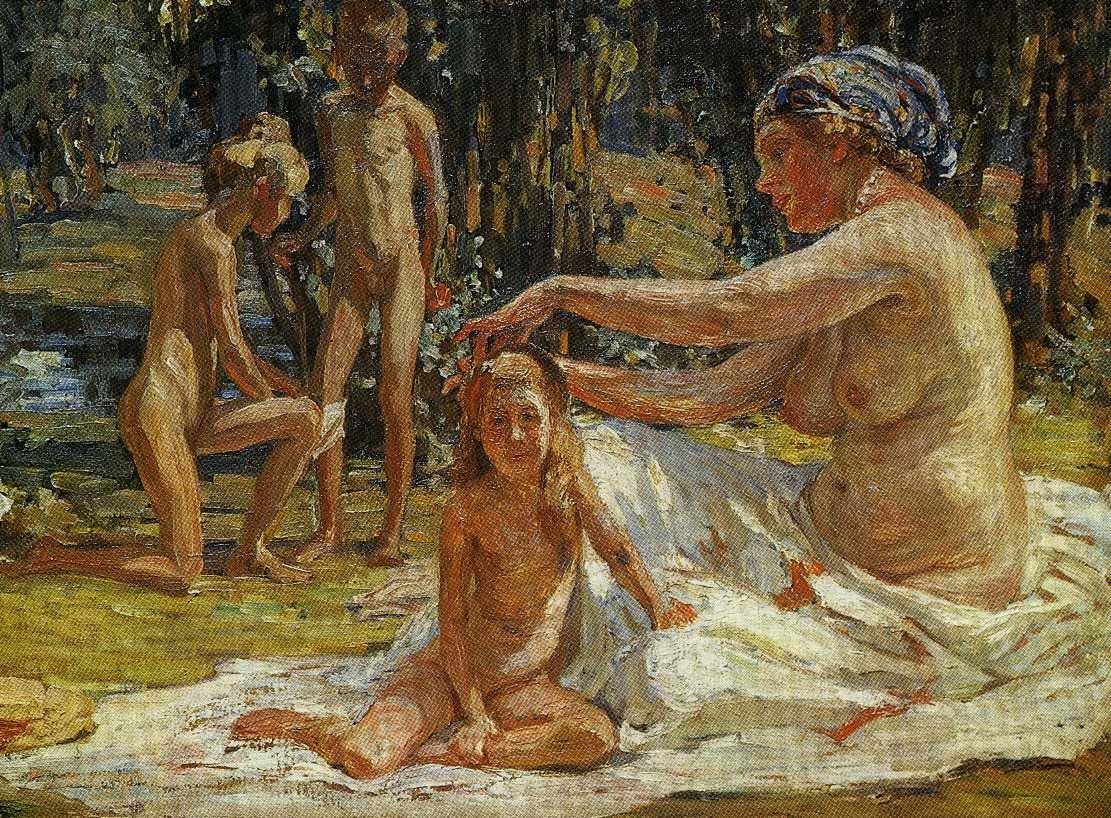
Family in the Sigulda (1913)

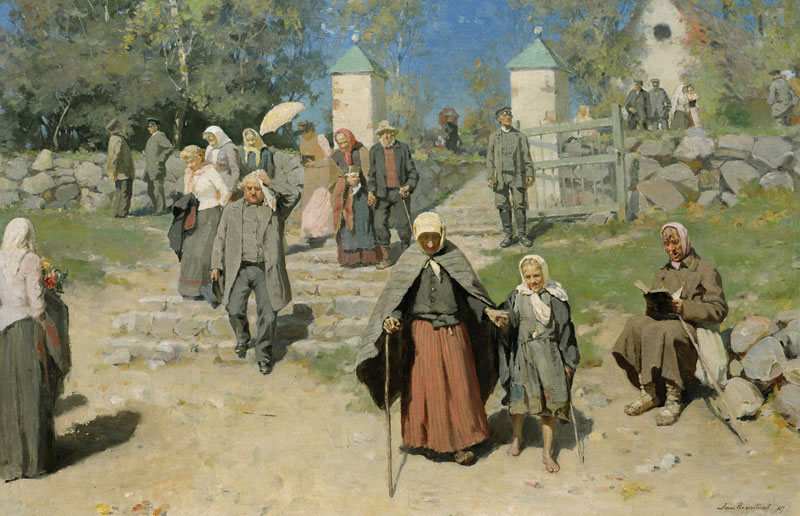
From the Cemetery (1895)

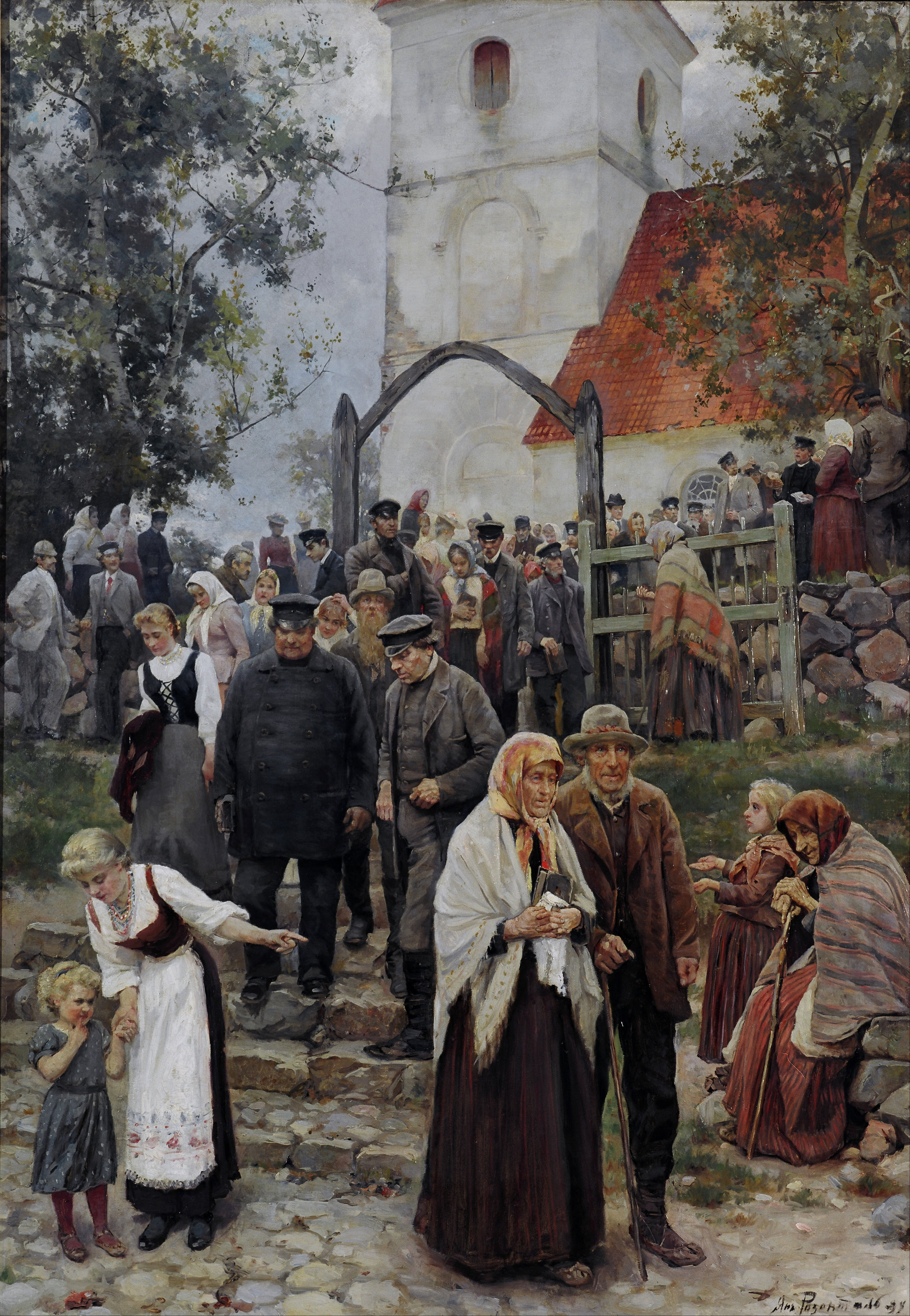
After Church (1894)

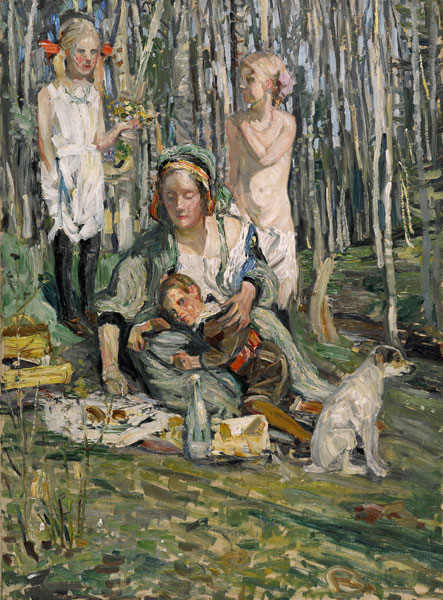
Picnic (1913)

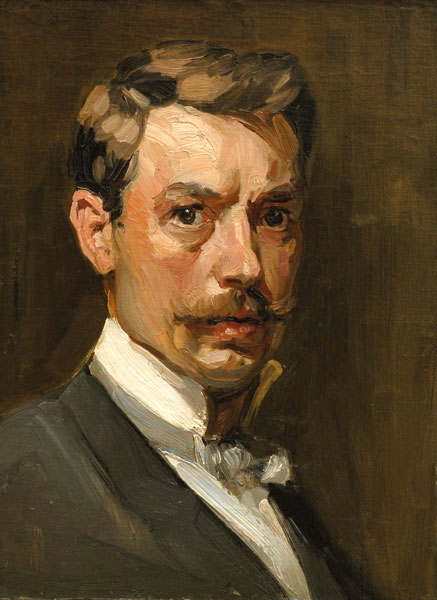
Self Portrait (1900)

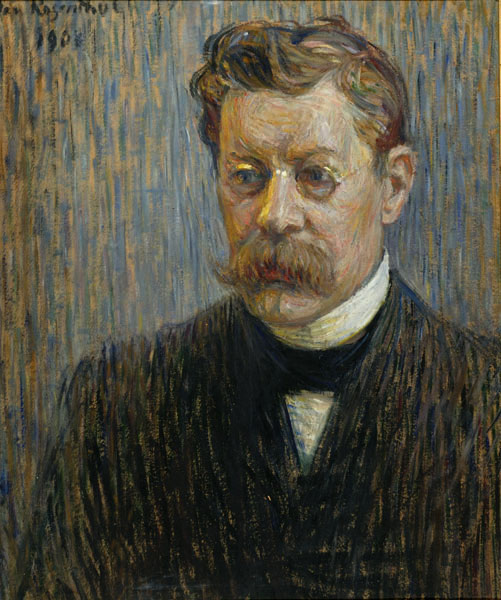
Portrait of Writer Rūdolfs Blaumanis (1908)

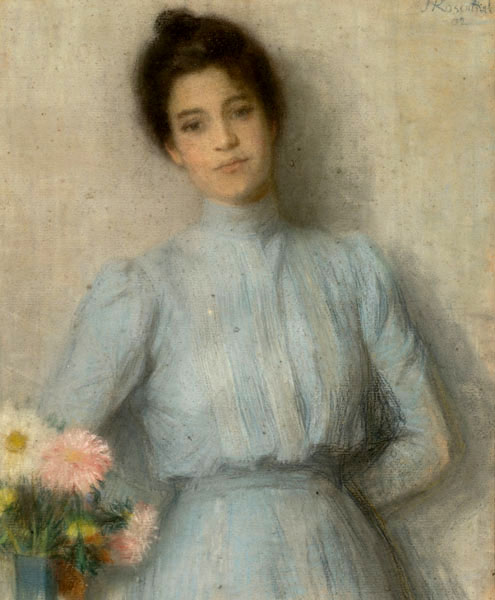
Portrait of Mērija Grosvalds (1902)

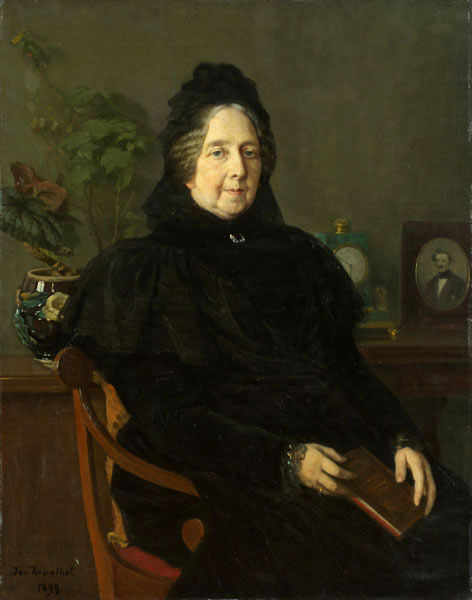
Portrait of Charlotte von Lieven (1899)

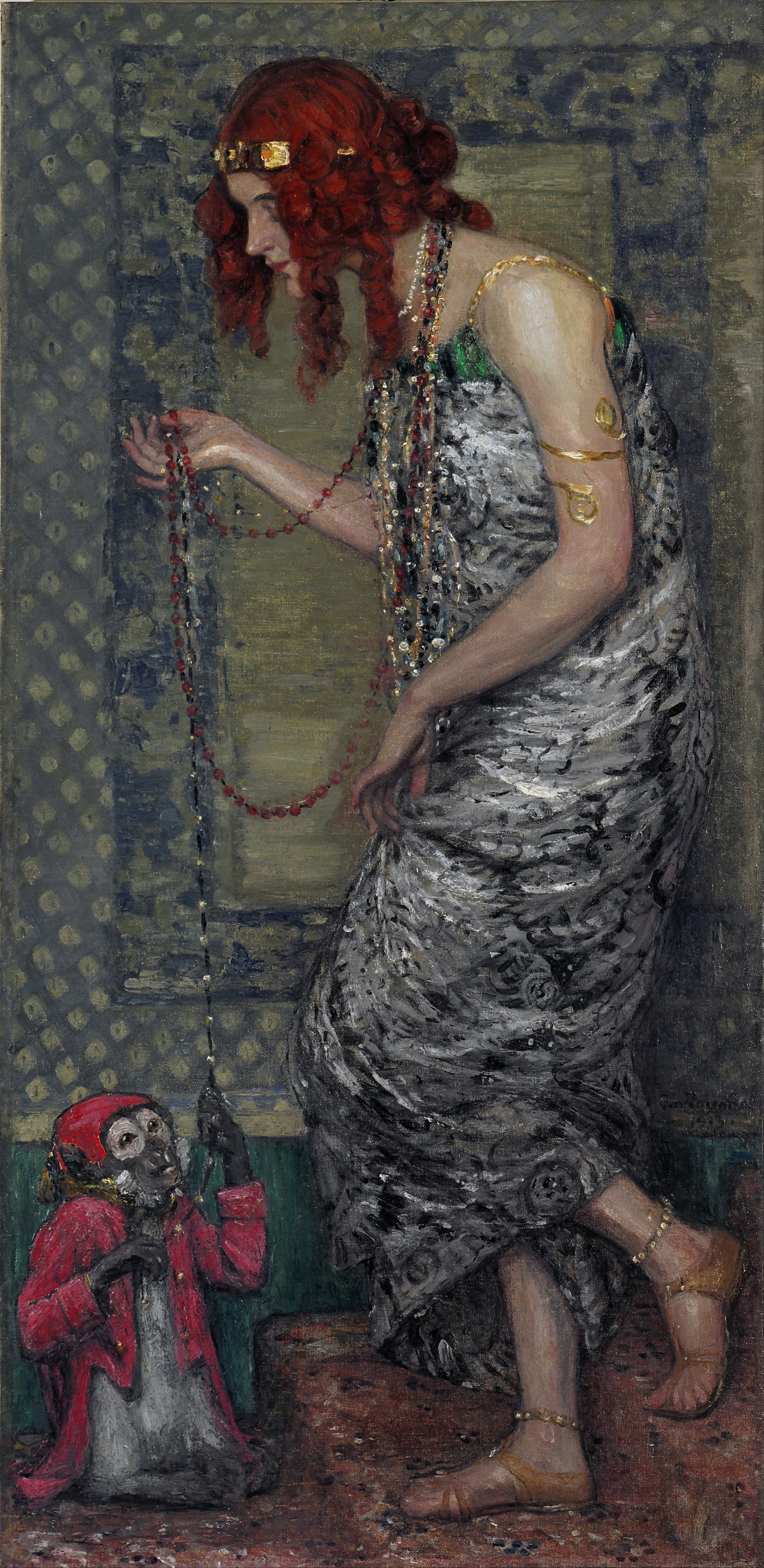
Princess with a Monkey (1913)

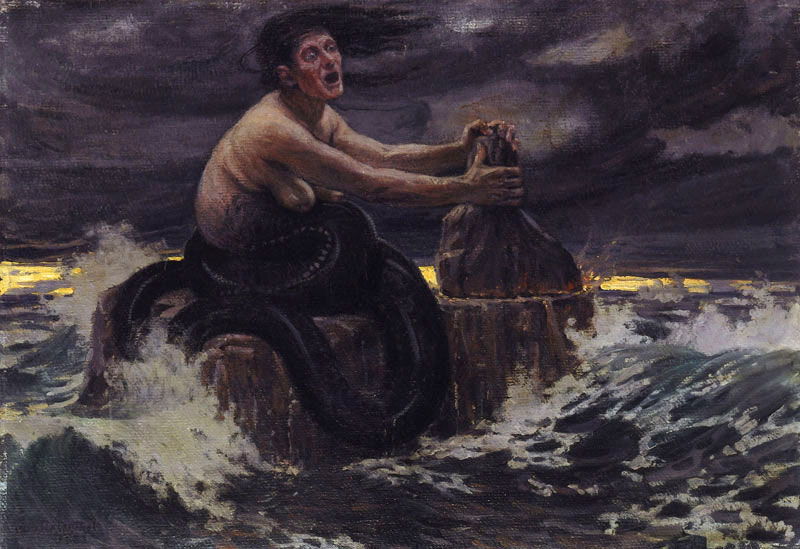
Black Snake (1903)

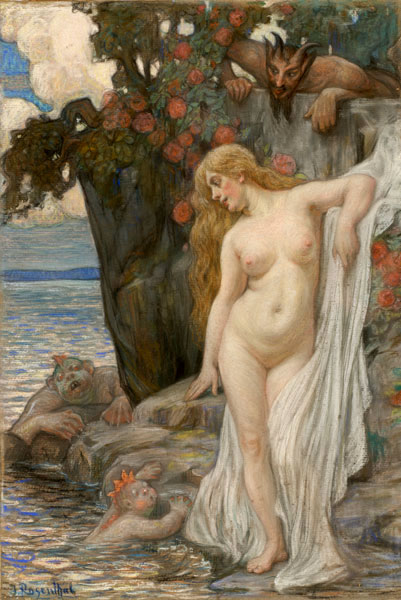
Women and the Spirits of Nature (1907)

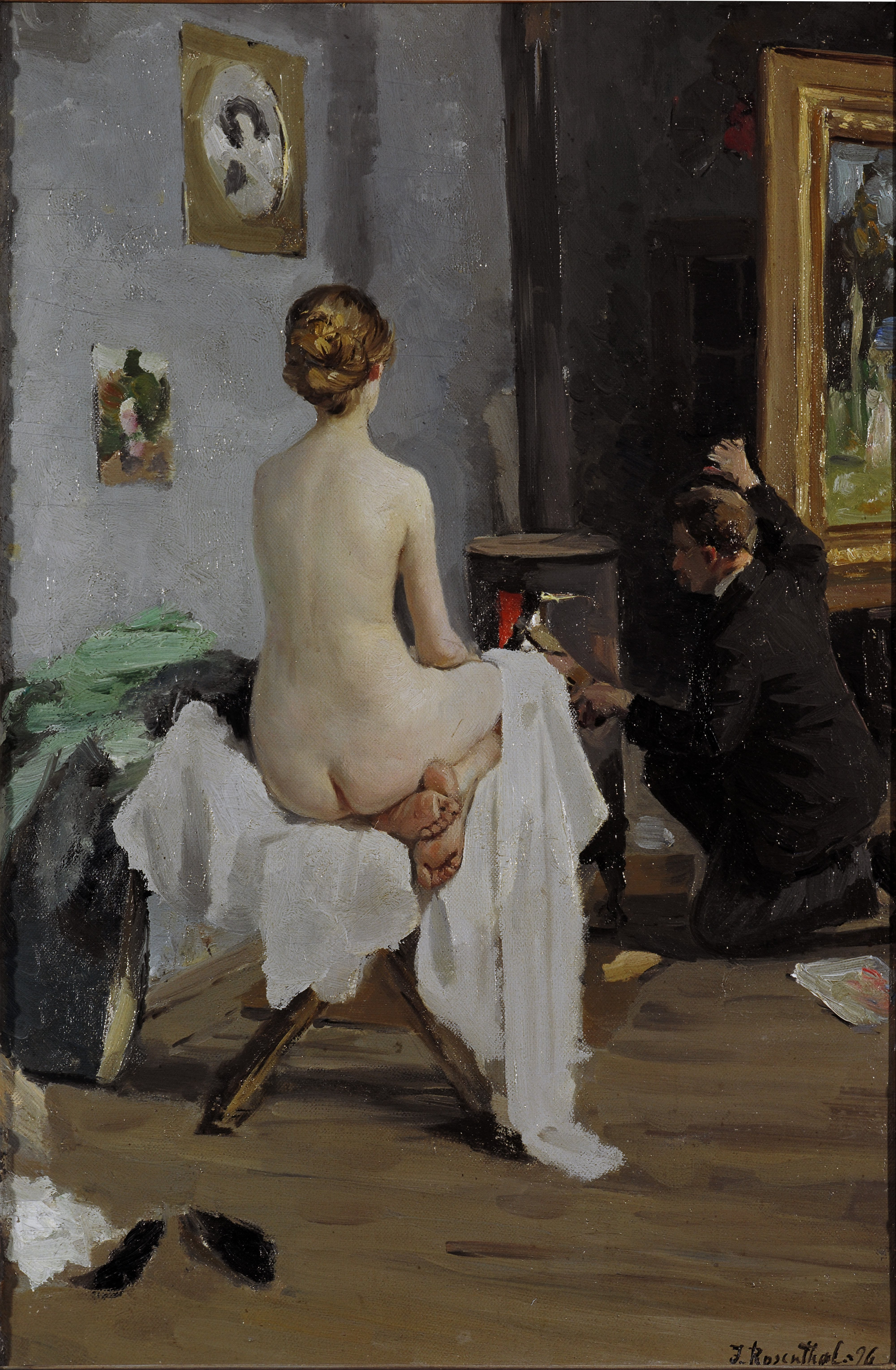
The Painter’s Studio (1896)

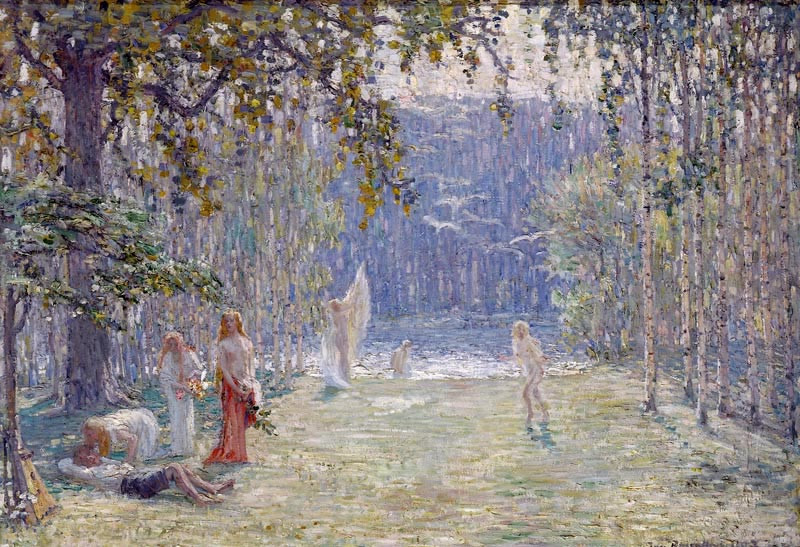
Daughters of Sun (1912)

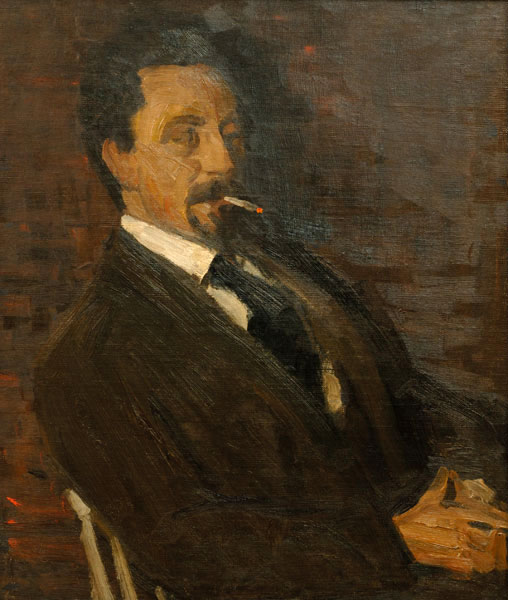
Men with a Russian Cigarette (1901)

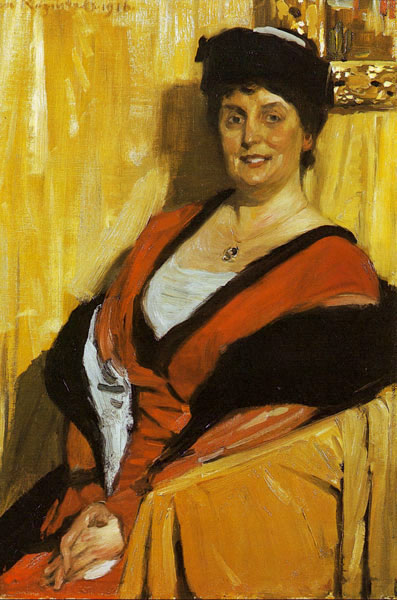
Portrait of M.Vīgnere-Grīnberga (1916)
