= Jaunsvente Manor =

Manor house in Latvia

- Jaunsventes muiža
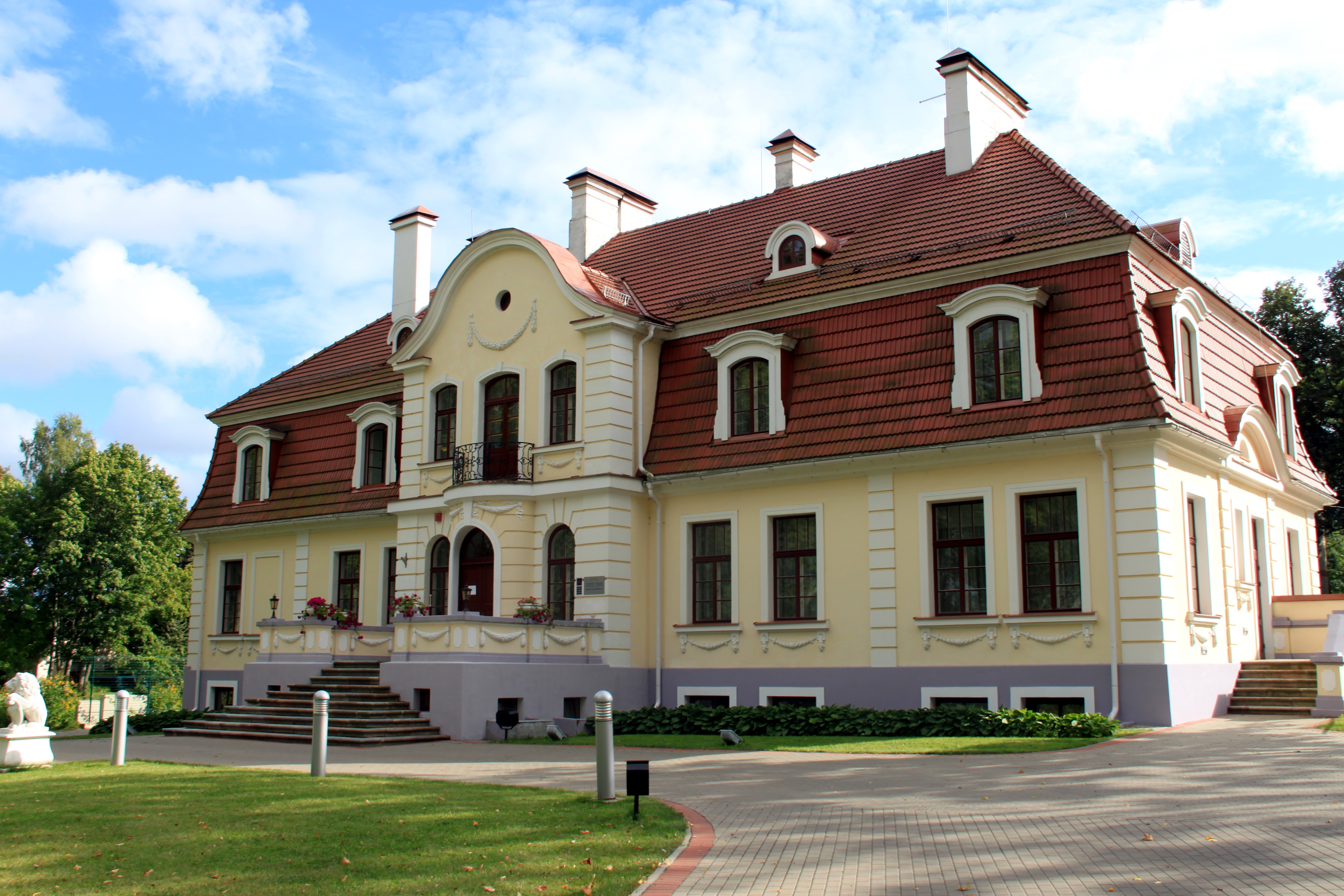
- Jaunsvente Manor House

- Location within Latvia

General information
- Architectural style: Neo-Baroque
- Location: Svente, Svente Parish, Augšdaugava Municipality, Latvia
- Coordinates: 55°54′12.2″N 26°22′34.6″E
- Completed: 1912
- Client: von Plater-Sieberg family

Design and construction
- Architect: Possibly Wilhelm Neumann

Jaunsvente Manor (Latvian: Jaunsventes muiža, German: Swenten), also called Svente Manor, is a manor house in Svente, Svente Parish, Augšdaugava Municipality in the Selonia region of Latvia. The renovated building is now managed by the SIA “Jaunsventes muiža”, which provides accommodations in their 12 rooms, each corresponding to one of the twelve months of the year.

== History ==
After the disposal of the estate by the Latvian government during the agrarian reform of 1922, the manor housed the Svente school. Construction was completed in 1912, apparently according to the architectural design of Wilhelm Neumann. The park was landscaped during the first half of the 19th century.

The restored country house of the Plater-Cyberk counts currently houses a museum in the grounds of the Jaunsvente estate. Among the exhibits are a Red Army heavy IS-2 tank, standard T-34 tanks, armored vehicles BRDM-1, BRDM-2, GAZ-67 trucks and a Willys Jeep.

== See also ==
- List of palaces and manor houses in Latvia
