= Administrative divisions of Latvia (2009–2021) =

On 1 July 2009 the former districts of Latvia were divided into 109 municipalities (Latvian: novadi, sing. novads), and nine republic cities (republikas pilsētas, sing. republikas pilsēta) with their own city council and administration. Many of the municipalities also featured parishes (pagasti, sing. pagasts) which were dissolved from 1949 to 1990, during the Soviet occupation of Latvia. In 2010, acting upon the request of the local populace, Mērsrags Municipality was split off from Roja Municipality, bringing the total to 110 municipalities.

The law that specified the new divisions (Law on Administrative Territories and Populated Places) was adopted in the Saeima on 18 December 2008. The law originally specified that municipalities and republic cities would have been coupled into an unspecified number of superior units – counties (apriņķi, sing. apriņķis), named after first-level units from interwar independent Latvia (e.g. Riga county). However, mostly due to the 2008–2011 economic crisis, the counties and the reform itself was not fully implemented.

The previous administrative reform had been enacted in 1990 upon the restoration of the independence of Latvia. For the current administrative divisions since 1st of July 2021, see Administrative divisions of Latvia.

== Republican cities prior to 2021 ==
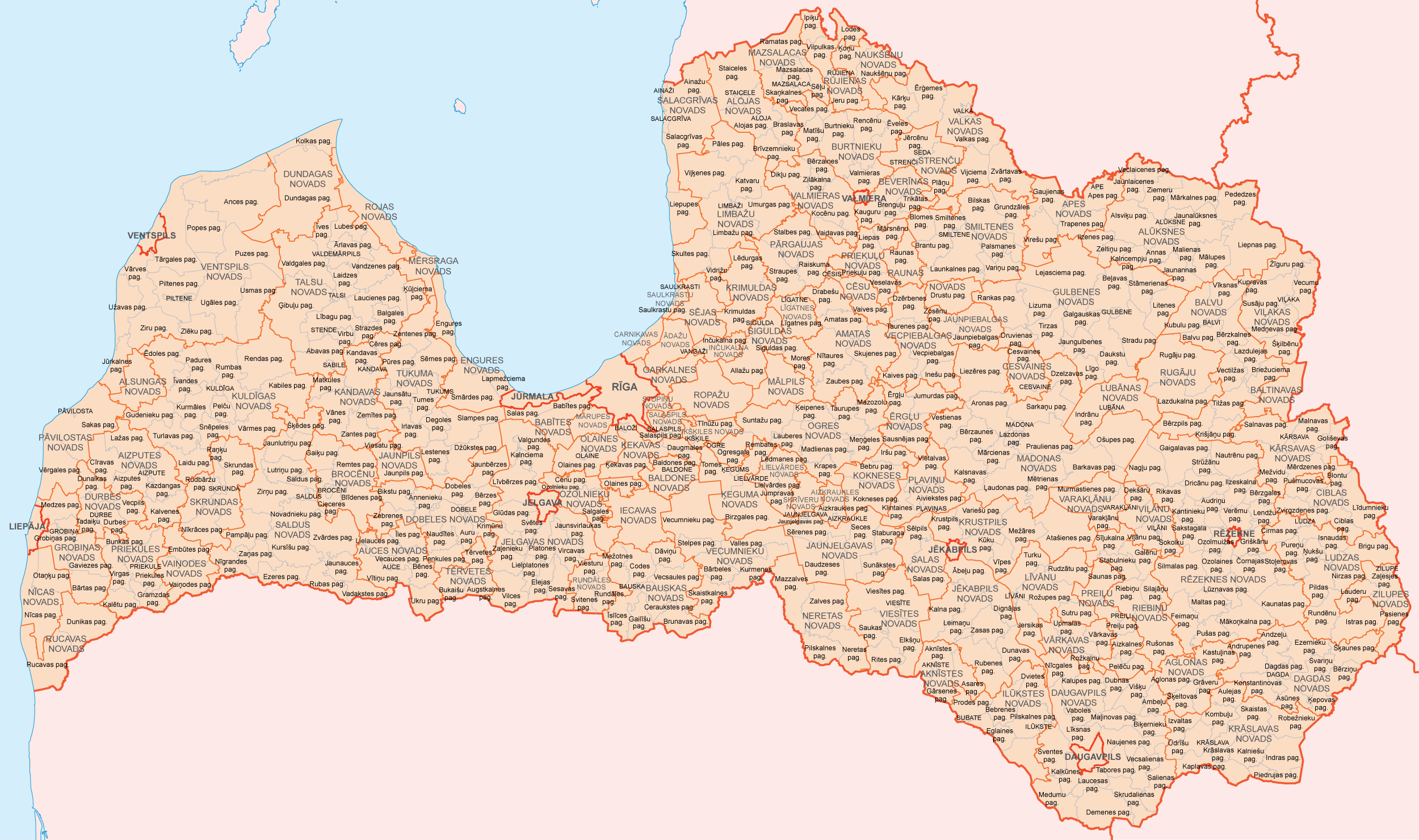
Administrative divisions of Latvia (as of 3 January 2011)

№	Name of the City	Population (2020 estimate)	GRP billions €, 2018	GRP per capita €, 2018
1.	Daugavpils	82,046	0.693	8,400
2.	Jēkabpils	21,928	0.235	10,600
3.	Jelgava	56,062	0.583	10,400
4.	Jūrmala	49,687	0.421	8,600
5.	Liepāja	68,535	0.897	13,000
6.	Rēzekne	27,613	0.283	10,100
7.	Riga	627,487	16.395	25,800
8.	Valmiera	23,050	0.391	16,900
9.	Ventspils	33,906	0.470	13,600

== Municipalities and their territorial units prior to 2021 ==
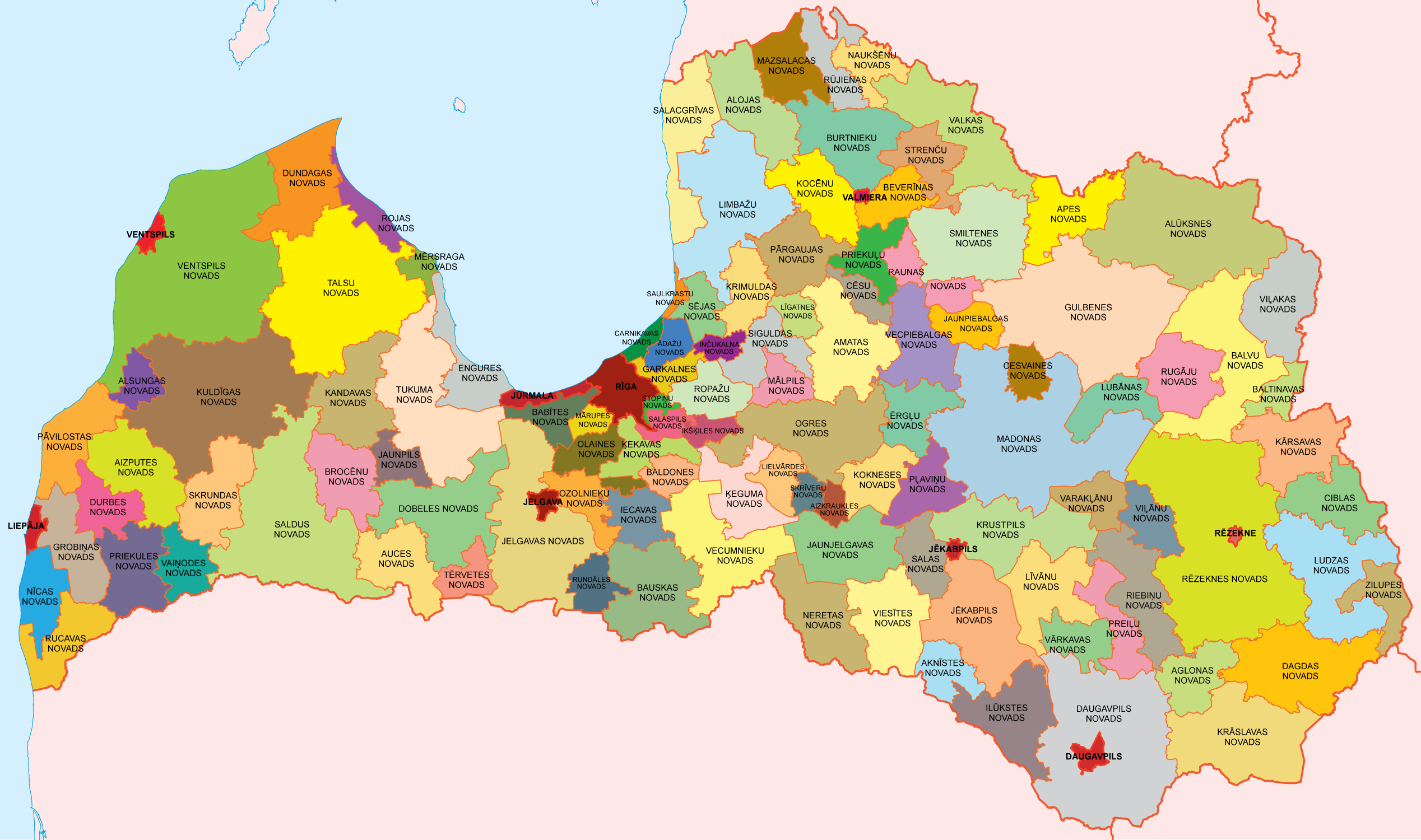
Former first-level administrative divisions of Latvia (2011–2021)

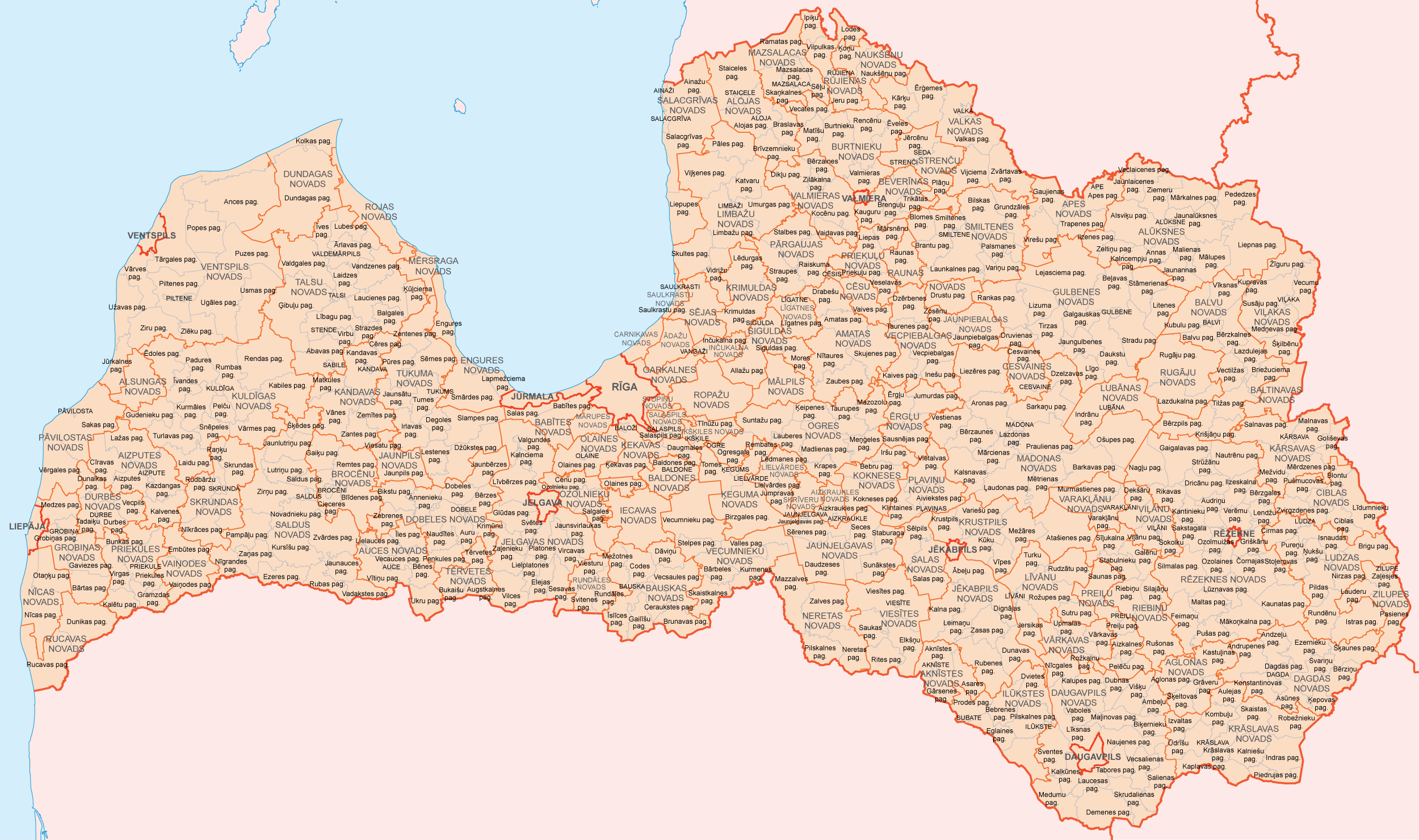
Former first- and second-level administrative divisions of Latvia (2011–2021)

№	Municipality	Population (2011)	Territorial units of municipality: (Towns and parishes)
1.	Aglona Municipality	3,930	Aglona Parish; Grāveri Parish; Kastuļina Parish; Šķeltova Parish
2.	Aizkraukle Municipality	8,984	Aizkraukle Parish; Aizkraukle town
3.	Aizpute Municipality	9,265	Aizpute Parish; Aizpute town Cīrava Parish; Kalvene Parish; Kazdanga Parish; Laža Parish
4.	Aknīste Municipality	2,967	Aknīste town Aknīste Parish; Asare Parish; Gārsene Parish
5.	Aloja Municipality	5,316	Aloja town Aloja Parish; Braslava Parish; Brīvzemnieki Parish; Staicele town Staicele Parish
6.	Alsunga Municipality	1,470	
7.	Alūksne Municipality	17,177	Alsviķi Parish; Alūksne town Anna Parish; Ilzene Parish; Jaunalūksne Parish; Jaunanna Parish; Jaunlaicene Parish; Kalncempji Parish; Liepna Parish; Maliena Parish; Mālupe Parish; Mārkalne Parish; Pededze Parish; Veclaicene Parish; Zeltiņi Parish; Ziemeri Parish
8.	Amata Municipality	5,667	Amata Parish; Drabeši Parish; Nītaure Parish; Skujene Parish; Zaube Parish
9.	Ape Municipality	3,834	Ape town Ape Parish; Gaujiena Parish; Trapene Parish; Vireši Parish
10.	Auce Municipality	7,345	Auce town Bēne Parish; Īle Parish; Lielauce Parish; Ukri Parish; Vecauce Parish; Vītiņi Parish
11.	Ādaži Municipality	10,027	
12.	Babīte Municipality	9,408	Sala Parish; Babīte Parish
13.	Baldone Municipality	5,478	Baldone town Baldone Parish
14.	Baltinava Municipality	1,177	
15.	Balvi Municipality	14,154	Balvi Parish; Balvi town Bērzkalne Parish; Bērzpils Parish; Briežuciems Parish; Krišjāņi Parish; Kubuli Parish; Lazduleja Parish; Tilža Parish; Vectilža Parish; Vīksna Parish
16.	Bauska Municipality	25,561	Bauska town Brunava Parish; Ceraukste Parish; Code Parish; Dāviņi Parish; Gailīši Parish; Īslīce Parish; Mežotne Parish; Vecsaule Parish
17.	Beverīna Municipality	3,260	Brenguļi Parish; Kauguri Parish; Trikāta Parish
18.	Brocēni Municipality	6,233	Brocēni town Blīdene Parish; Ciecere Parish; Gaiķi Parish; Remte Parish
19.	Burtnieki Municipality	8,307	Burtnieki Parish; Ēvele Parish; Matīši Parish; Rencēni Parish; Valmiera Parish; Vecate Parish
20.	Carnikava Municipality	6,712	
21.	Cēsis Municipality	18,246	Cēsis town Vaive Parish
22.	Cesvaine Municipality	2,802	Cesvaine town Cesvaine Parish
23.	Cibla Municipality	2,875	Blonti Parish; Cibla Parish; Līdumnieki Parish; Pušmucova Parish; Zvirgzdene Parish
24.	Dagda Municipality	8,286	Andrupene Parish; Andzeļi Parish; Asūne Parish; Bērziņi Parish; Dagda town Dagda Parish; Ezernieki Parish; Konstantinova Parish; Ķepova Parish; Svariņi Parish; Šķaune Parish
25.	Daugavpils Municipality	25,127	Ambeļi Parish; Biķernieki Parish; Demene Parish; Dubna Parish; Kalkūne Parish; Kalupe Parish; Laucesa Parish; Līksna Parish; Maļinova Parish; Medumi Parish; Naujene Parish; Nīcgale Parish; Saliena Parish; Skrudaliena Parish; Svente Parish; Tabore Parish; Vabole Parish; Vecsaliena Parish; Višķi Parish
26.	Dobele Municipality	22,216	Annenieki Parish; Auri Parish; Bērze Parish; Biksti Parish; Dobele Parish; Dobele town Jaunbērze Parish; Krimūna Parish; Naudīte Parish; Penkule Parish; Zebrene Parish
27.	Dundaga Municipality	4,228	Kolka Parish; Dundaga Parish
28.	Durbe Municipality	3,048	Dunalka Parish; Durbe town Durbe Parish; Tadaiķi Parish; Vecpils Parish
29.	Engure Municipality	7,575	Engure Parish; Lapmežciems Parish; Smārde Parish
30.	Ērgļi Municipality	3,193	Ērgļi Parish; Jumurda Parish; Sausnēja Parish
31.	Garkalne Municipality	7,768	
32.	Grobiņa Municipality	9,345	Bārta Parish; Gavieze Parish; Grobiņa Parish; Grobiņa town Medze Parish
33.	Gulbene Municipality	22,794	Beļava Parish; Dauksti Parish; Druviena Parish; Galgauska Parish; Gulbene town Jaungulbene Parish; Lejasciems Parish; Litene Parish; Lizums Parish; Līgo Parish; Ranka Parish; Stāmeriena Parish; Stradi Parish; Tirza Parish
34.	Iecava Municipality	9,059	
35.	Ikšķile Municipality	8,798	Ikšķile town Tīnūži Parish
36.	Inčukalns Municipality	7,935	Inčukalns Parish; Vangaži town
37.	Ilūkste Municipality	7,994	Bebrene Parish; Dviete Parish; Eglaine Parish; Ilūkste town Pilskalne Parish; Prode Parish; Subate town Šēdere Parish
38.	Jaunjelgava Municipality	5,797	Daudzese Parish; Jaunjelgava town Jaunjelgava Parish; Sece Parish; Sērene Parish; Staburags Parish; Sunākste Parish
39.	Jaunpiebalga Municipality	2,390	Jaunpiebalga Parish; Zosēni Parish
40.	Jaunpils Municipality	2,450	Jaunpils Parish; Viesati Parish
41.	Jēkabpils Municipality	5,087	Ābeļi Parish; Dignāja Parish; Dunava Parish; Kalna Parish; Leimaņi Parish; Rubene Parish; Zasa Parish
42.	Jelgava Municipality	24,649	Eleja Parish; Glūda Parish; Jaunsvirlauka Parish; Kalnciems Parish; Lielplatone Parish; Līvbērze Parish; Platone Parish; Sesava Parish; Svēte Parish; Valgunde Parish; Vilce Parish; Vircava Parish; Zaļenieki Parish
43.	Kandava Municipality	8,885	Cēres Parish; Kandava Parish; Kandava town Matkule Parish; Vāne Parish; Zante Parish; Zemīte Parish
44.	Kārsava Municipality	6,278	Goliševa Parish; Kārsava town Malnava Parish; Mērdzene Parish; Mežvidi Parish; Salnava Parish
45.	Kocēni Municipality	6,311	Bērzaine Parish; Dikļi Parish; Kocēni Parish; Vaidava Parish; Zilākalns Parish
46.	Koknese Municipality	5,445	Bebri Parish; Irši Parish; Koknese Parish
47.	Krāslava Municipality	17,506	Auleja Parish; Indra Parish; Izvalta Parish; Kalnieši Parish; Kaplava Parish; Kombuļi Parish; Krāslava Parish; Krāslava town Piedruja Parish; Robežnieki Parish; Skaista Parish; Ūdrīši Parish
48.	Krimulda Municipality	5,323	Krimulda Parish; Lēdurga Parish
49.	Krustpils Municipality	6,086	Atašiene Parish; Krustpils Parish; Kūkas Parish; Mežāre Parish; Varieši Parish; Vīpe Parish
50.	Kuldīga Municipality	24,850	Ēdole Parish; Gudenieki Parish; Īvande Parish; Kabile Parish; Kuldīga town Kurmāle Parish; Laidi Parish; Padure Parish; Pelči Parish; Renda Parish; Rumba Parish; Snēpele Parish; Turlava Parish; Vārme Parish
51.	Ķegums Municipality	5,735	Ķegums town Birzgale Parish; Rembates Parish; Tome Parish
52.	Ķekava Municipality	21,913	Baloži town Daugmale Parish; Ķekava Parish
53.	Lielvārde Municipality	10,388	Jumprava Parish; Lēdmane Parish; Lielvārde town Lielvārde Parish
54.	Līgatne Municipality	3,684	Līgatne Parish; Līgatne town
55.	Limbaži Municipality	17,781	Katvari Parish; Limbaži Parish; Limbaži town Pāle Parish; Skulte Parish; Umurga Parish; Vidriži Parish; Viļķene Parish
56.	Līvāni Municipality	12,496	Jersika Parish; Līvāni town Rožupe Parish; Rudzāti Parish; Sutri Parish; Turki Parish
57.	Lubāna Municipality	2,537	Indrāni Parish; Lubāna town
58.	Ludza Municipality	14,226	Briģi Parish; Cirma Parish; Isnauda Parish; Istra Parish; Ludza town Nirza Parish; Ņukši Parish; Pilda Parish; Pureņi Parish; Rundēni Parish
59.	Madona Municipality	25,118	Arona Parish; Barkava Parish; Bērzaune Parish; Dzelzava Parish; Kalsnava Parish; Lazdona Parish; Liezēre Parish; Ļaudona Parish; Madona town Mārciena Parish; Mētriena Parish; Ošupe Parish; Prauliena Parish; Sarkaņi Parish; Vestiena Parish
60.	Mālpils Municipality	3,626	
61.	Mārupe Municipality	15,950	
62.	Mazsalaca Municipality	3,460	Mazsalaca town Mazsalaca Parish; Ramata Parish; Sēļi Parish; Skaņkalne Parish
63.	Mērsrags Municipality	1,638	
64.	Naukšēni Municipality	1,987	Ķoņi Parish; Naukšēni Parish
65.	Nereta Municipality	3,878	Mazzalve Parish; Nereta Parish; Pilskalne Parish; Zalve Parish
66.	Nīca Municipality	3,579	Nīca Parish; Otaņķi Parish
67.	Ogre Municipality	36,202	Krape Parish; Ķeipene Parish; Laubere Parish; Madliena Parish; Mazozoli Parish; Meņģele Parish; Ogre town Ogresgals Parish; Suntaži Parish; Taurupe Parish
68.	Olaine Municipality	20,116	Olaine Parish; Olaine town
69.	Ozolnieki Municipality	9,753	Ozolnieki Parish; Cena Parish; Salgale Parish
70.	Pārgauja Municipality	3,953	Raiskums Parish; Stalbe Parish; Straupe Parish
71.	Pāvilosta Municipality	2,850	Vērgale Parish; Pāvilosta town Saka Parish
72.	Pļaviņas Municipality	5,680	Aiviekste Parish; Klintaine Parish; Pļaviņas town Vietalva Parish
73.	Preiļi Municipality	10,696	Aizkalne Parish; Pelēči Parish; Preiļi Parish; Preiļi town Sauna Parish
74.	Priekule Municipality	5,837	Bunka Parish; Virga Parish; Gramzda Parish; Kalēti Parish; Priekule town Priekule Parish
75.	Priekuļi Municipality	8,365	Liepa Parish; Mārsnēni Parish; Priekuļi Parish; Veselava Parish
76.	Rauna Municipality	3,592	Drusti Parish; Rauna Parish
77.	Rēzekne Municipality	28,208	Audriņi Parish; Bērzgale Parish; Čornaja Parish; Dricāni Parish; Feimaņi Parish; Gaigalava Parish; Griškāni Parish; Ilzeskalns Parish; Kantinieki Parish; Kaunata Parish; Lendži Parish; Lūznava Parish; Mākoņkalns Parish; Malta Parish; Nagļi Parish; Nautrēni Parish; Ozolaine Parish; Ozolmuiža Parish; Puša Parish; Rikava Parish; Sakstagals Parish; Silmala Parish; Stoļerova Parish; Strūžāni Parish; Vērēmi Parish
78.	Riebiņi Municipality	5,536	Galēni Parish; Riebiņi Parish; Rušona Parish; Silajāņi Parish; Sīļukalns Parish; Stabulnieki Parish
79.	Roja Municipality	3,972	Roja Parish
80.	Ropaži Municipality	6,904	
81.	Rucava Municipality	1,814	Dunika Parish; Rucava Parish
82.	Rugāji Municipality	2,363	Lazdukalns Parish; Rugāji Parish
83.	Rundāle Municipality	3,698	Rundāle Parish; Svitene Parish; Viesturi Parish
84.	Rūjiena Municipality	5,577	Ipiķi Parish; Jeri Parish; Lode Parish; Rūjiena town Vilpulka Parish
85.	Salacgrīva Municipality	8,323	Ainaži town Ainaži Parish; Liepupe Parish; Salacgrīva town Salacgrīva Parish
86.	Sala Municipality	3,796	Sēlpils Parish; Sala Parish
87.	Salaspils Municipality	22,391	Salaspils town Salaspils Parish
88.	Saldus Municipality	25,604	Ezere Parish; Jaunauce Parish; Jaunlutriņi Parish; Kursīši Parish; Lutriņi Parish; Nīgrande Parish; Novadnieki Parish; Pampāļi Parish; Ruba Parish; Saldus Parish; Saldus town Šķēde Parish; Vadakste Parish; Zaņa Parish; Zirņi Parish; Zvārde Parish
89.	Saulkrasti Municipality	5,855	Saulkrasti town Saulkrasti Parish
90.	Sēja Municipality	2,293	
91.	Sigulda Municipality	16,729	Allaži Parish; More Parish; Sigulda Parish; Sigulda town
92.	Skrīveri Municipality	3,708	
93.	Skrunda Municipality	5,313	Nīkrāce Parish; Raņķi Parish; Rudbārži Parish; Skrunda town Skrunda Parish
94.	Smiltene Municipality	13,078	Bilska Parish; Blome Parish; Branti Parish; Grundzāle Parish; Launkalne Parish; Palsmane Parish; Smiltene Parish; Smiltene town Variņi Parish
95.	Stopiņi Municipality	10,096	
96.	Strenči Municipality	3,827	Jērcēni Parish; Plāņi Parish; Seda town Strenči town
97.	Talsi Municipality	31,219	Abava Parish; Ārlava Parish; Balgale Parish; Ģibuļi Parish; Īve Parish; Ķūļciems Parish; Laidze Parish; Lauciene Parish; Lībagi Parish; Lube Parish; Sabile town Stende town Strazde Parish; Talsi town Valdemārpils town Valdgale Parish; Vandzene Parish; Virbi Parish
98.	Tērvete Municipality	3,687	Augstkalne Parish; Bukaiši Parish; Tērvete Parish
99.	Tukums Municipality	30,614	Degole Parish; Džūkste Parish; Irlava Parish; Jaunsāti Parish; Lestene Parish; Pūre Parish; Sēme Parish; Slampe Parish; Tukums town Tume Parish; Zentene Parish
100.	Vaiņode Municipality	2,613	Embūte Parish; Vaiņode Parish
101.	Valka Municipality	9,299	Ērģeme Parish; Kārķi Parish; Valka Parish; Valka town Vijciems Parish; Zvārtava Parish
102.	Varakļāni Municipality	3,560	Murmastiene Parish; Varakļāni Parish; Varakļāni town
103.	Vārkava Municipality	2,113	Rožkalni Parish; Upmala Parish; Vārkava Parish
104.	Vecpiebalga Municipality	4,161	Dzērbene Parish; Ineši Parish; Kaive Parish; Taurene Parish; Vecpiebalga Parish
105.	Vecumnieki Municipality	8,786	Bārbele Parish; Kurmene Parish; Skaistkalne Parish; Stelpe Parish; Valle Parish; Vecumnieki Parish
106.	Ventspils Municipality	12,139	Ance Parish; Jūrkalne Parish; Piltene town Piltene Parish; Pope Parish; Puze Parish; Tārgale Parish; Ugāle Parish; Usma Parish; Užava Parish; Vārve Parish; Ziras Parish; Zlēkas Parish
107.	Viesīte Municipality	4,133	Elkšņi Parish; Rite Parish; Sauka Parish; Viesīte town Viesīte Parish
108.	Viļaka Municipality	5,665	Kuprava Parish; Medņeva Parish; Susāji Parish; Šķilbēni Parish; Vecumi Parish; Viļaka town Žīguri Parish
109.	Viļāni Municipality	6,409	Dekšāres Parish; Sokolki Parish; Viļāni Parish; Viļāni town
110.	Zilupe Municipality	3,353	Lauderi Parish; Pasiene Parish; Zaļesje Parish; Zilupe town

== See also ==
- Administrative divisions of Latvia before 2009
- Historical Latvian Lands
- List of cities and towns in Latvia
- List of former cities of Latvia
- Planning regions of Latvia
- Statistical regions of Latvia
- ISO 3166-2:LV
