= ISO 3166-2:LV =

Entry for Latvia in ISO 3166-2

ISO 3166-2:LV is the entry for Latvia in ISO 3166-2, part of the ISO 3166 standard published by the International Organization for Standardization (ISO), which defines codes for the names of the principal subdivisions (e.g., provinces or states) of all countries coded in ISO 3166-1.

Currently for Latvia, ISO 3166-2 codes are defined for 36 municipalities and seven state cities. The seven state cities have special status equal to the municipalities.

Each code consists of two parts separated by a hyphen. The first part is LV, the ISO 3166-1 alpha-2 code of Latvia. The second part is either of the following:

- three digits: municipalities
- three letters: state cities

== Current codes ==
Subdivision names are listed as in the ISO 3166-2 standard published by the ISO 3166 Maintenance Agency (ISO 3166/MA).

Subdivision names are sorted in Latvian alphabetical order: a, ā, b-c, č, d-e, ē, f-g, ģ, h-i, ī, j-k, ķ, l, ļ, m-n, ņ, o-s, š, t-u, ū, v-z, ž.

Click on the button in the header to sort each column.

Code	Subdivision name (lv)	Local variant	Subdivision category
LV-002	Aizkraukles novads	Aizkraukle	municipality
LV-007	Alūksnes novads	Alūksne	municipality
LV-111	Augšdaugavas novads	Augšdaugava	municipality
LV-011	Ādažu novads	Ādaži	municipality
LV-015	Balvu novads	Balvi	municipality
LV-016	Bauskas novads	Bauska	municipality
LV-022	Cēsu novads	Cēsis	municipality
LV-DGV	Daugavpils		state city
LV-112	Dienvidkurzemes Novads	Dienvidkurzeme	municipality
LV-026	Dobeles novads	Dobele	municipality
LV-033	Gulbenes novads	Gulbene	municipality
LV-JEL	Jelgava		state city
LV-041	Jelgavas novads	Jelgava	municipality
LV-042	Jēkabpils novads	Jēkabpils	municipality
LV-JUR	Jūrmala		state city
LV-047	Krāslavas novads	Krāslava	municipality
LV-050	Kuldīgas novads	Kuldīga	municipality
LV-052	Ķekavas novads	Ķekava	municipality
LV-LPX	Liepāja		state city
LV-054	Limbažu novads	Limbaži	municipality
LV-056	Līvānu novads	Līvāni	municipality
LV-058	Ludzas novads	Ludza	municipality
LV-059	Madonas novads	Madona	municipality
LV-062	Mārupes novads	Mārupe	municipality
LV-067	Ogres novads	Ogre	municipality
LV-068	Olaines novads	Olaine	municipality
LV-073	Preiļu novads	Preiļi	municipality
LV-REZ	Rēzekne		state city
LV-077	Rēzeknes novads	Rēzekne	municipality
LV-RIX	Rīga		state city
LV-080	Ropažu novads	Ropaži	municipality
LV-087	Salaspils novads	Salaspils	municipality
LV-088	Saldus novads	Saldus	municipality
LV-089	Saulkrastu novads	Saulkrasti	municipality
LV-091	Siguldas novads	Sigulda	municipality
LV-094	Smiltenes novads	Smiltene	municipality
LV-097	Talsu novads	Talsi	municipality
LV-099	Tukuma novads	Tukums	municipality
LV-101	Valkas novads	Valka	municipality
LV-113	Valmieras Novads	Valmiera	municipality
LV-102	Varakļānu novads	Varakļāni	municipality
LV-VEN	Ventspils		state city
LV-106	Ventspils novads	Ventspils	municipality

== Changes ==
The following changes to the entry have been announced by the ISO 3166/MA since the first publication of ISO 3166-2 in 1998:

Newsletter	Date issued	Description of change in newsletter	Code/Subdivision change
Newsletter II-3	2011-12-13 (corrected 2011-12-15)	Administrative re-organization and source list update.	Subdivision layout: 26 districts (see below) → 110 municipalities Subdivisions added: (republican cities); LV-JKB Jēkabpils; LV-VMR Valmiera
Online Browsing; Platform (OBP)	2021-11-25	Deletion of republican city LV-JKB, LV-VMR; Deletion of municipality LV-001, LV-003, LV-004, LV-005, LV-006, LV-008, LV-009, LV-010, LV-012, LV-013, LV-014, LV-017, LV-018, LV-019, LV-020, LV-021, LV-023, LV-024, LV-025, LV-027, LV-028, LV-029, LV-030, LV-031, LV-032, LV-034, LV-035, LV-036, LV-037, LV-038, LV-039, LV-040, LV-043, LV-044, LV-045, LV-046, LV-048, LV-049, LV-051, LV-053, LV-055, LV-057, LV-060, LV-061, LV-063, LV-064, LV-065, LV-066, LV-069, LV-070, LV-071, LV-072, LV-074, LV-075, LV-076, LV-078, LV-079, LV-081, LV-082, LV-083, LV-084, LV-085, LV-086, LV-090, LV-092, LV-093, LV-095, LV-096, LV-098, LV-100, LV-103, LV-104, LV-105, LV-107, LV-108, LV-109, LV-110; Change of category name from republican city to state city for LV-DGV, LV-JEL, LV-JUR, LV-LPX, LV-REZ, LV-RIX, LV-VEN; Addition of municipality LV-111, LV-112, LV-113; Update List Source	Subdivisions added: LV-111 Augšdaugavas novads LV-112 Dienvidkurzemes Novads; LV-113 Valmieras Novads; Subdivisions deleted: LV-JKB Jēkabpils; LV-VMR Valmiera; LV-001 Aglonas novads LV-003 Aizputes novads LV-004 Aknīstes novads LV-005 Alojas novads LV-006 Alsungas novads LV-008 Amatas novads LV-009 Apes novads LV-010 Auces novads LV-012 Babītes novads LV-013 Baldones novads LV-014 Baltinavas novads LV-017 Beverīnas novads LV-018 Brocēnu novads LV-019 Burtnieku novads LV-020 Carnikavas novads LV-021 Cesvaines novads LV-023 Ciblas novads LV-024 Dagdas novads LV-025 Daugavpils novads LV-027 Dundagas novads LV-028 Durbes novads LV-029 Engures novads LV-030 Ērgļu novads LV-031 Garkalnes novads LV-032 Grobiņas novads LV-034 Iecavas novads LV-035 Ikšķiles novads LV-036 Ilūkstes novads LV-037 Inčukalna novads LV-038 Jaunjelgavas novads LV-039 Jaunpiebalgas novads LV-040 Jaunpils novads LV-043 Kandavas novads LV-044 Kārsavas novads LV-045 Kocēnu novads LV-046 Kokneses novads LV-048 Krimuldas novads LV-049 Krustpils novads LV-051 Ķeguma novads LV-053 Lielvārdes novads LV-055 Līgatnes novads LV-057 Lubānas novads LV-060 Mazsalacas novads LV-061 Mālpils novads LV-063 Mērsraga novads LV-064 Naukšēnu novads LV-065 Neretas novads LV-066 Nīcas novads LV-069 Ozolnieku novads LV-070 Pārgaujas novads LV-071 Pāvilostas novads LV-072 Pļaviņu novads LV-074 Priekules novads LV-075 Priekuļu novads LV-076 Raunas novads LV-078 Riebiņu novads LV-079 Rojas novads LV-081 Rucavas novads LV-082 Rugāju novads LV-083 Rundāles novads LV-084 Rūjienas novads LV-085 Salas novads LV-086 Salacgrīvas novads LV-090 Sējas novads LV-092 Skrīveru novads LV-093 Skrundas novads LV-095 Stopiņu novads LV-096 Strenču novads LV-098 Tērvetes novads LV-100 Vaiņodes novads LV-103 Vārkavas novads LV-104 Vecpiebalgas novads LV-105 Vecumnieku novads LV-107 Viesītes novads LV-108 Viļakas novads LV-109 Viļānu novads LV-110 Zilupes novads

=== Codes before Newsletter II-3 ===
Former code	Subdivision name	Subdivision category
LV-AI	Aizkraukles Apriņķis	district
LV-AL	Alūksnes Apriņķis	district
LV-BL	Balvu Apriņķis	district
LV-BU	Bauskas Apriņķis	district
LV-CE	Cēsu Apriņķis	district
LV-DA	Daugavpils Apriņķis	district
LV-DO	Dobeles Apriņķis	district
LV-GU	Gulbenes Apriņķis	district
LV-JL	Jelgavas Apriņķis	district
LV-JK	Jēkabpils Apriņķis	district
LV-KR	Krāslavas Apriņķis	district
LV-KU	Kuldīgas Apriņķis	district
LV-LE	Liepājas Apriņķis	district
LV-LM	Limbažu Apriņķis	district
LV-LU	Ludzas Apriņķis	district
LV-MA	Madonas Apriņķis	district
LV-OG	Ogres Apriņķis	district
LV-PR	Preiļu Apriņķis	district
LV-RE	Rēzeknes Apriņķis	district
LV-RI	Rīgas Apriņķis	district
LV-SA	Saldus Apriņķis	district
LV-TA	Talsu Apriņķis	district
LV-TU	Tukuma Apriņķis	district
LV-VK	Valkas Apriņķis	district
LV-VM	Valmieras Apriņķis	district
LV-VE	Ventspils Apriņķis	district

== See also ==
- Subdivisions of Latvia
- FIPS region codes of Latvia
- NUTS codes of Latvia
- Neighbouring countries: BY, EE, LT, RU
