= Dobele district =

District of Latvia

Coordinates: 56°37′N 23°16′E

Dobele
- District
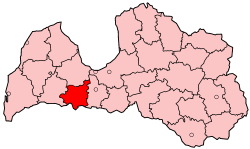
- Country: Latvia

Area
  - Total: 1,632 km^{2} (630 sq mi)

Population
  - Total: 37,713
  - Density: 23.11/km^{2} (59.85/sq mi)
- Website: dobelesrp.lv/

Dobele district (Latvian: Dobeles rajons) was an administrative division of Latvia, located in the Courland and Semigallia regions, in the country's centre. It was organized into two cities, a municipality and fifteen parishes, each with a local government authority. The main city in the district was Dobele.

Districts were eliminated during the administrative-territorial reform in 2009.

== Cities, municipalities and parishes of the Dobele district ==
- Annenieki Parish
- Auce city
- Auri Parish
- Bēne Parish
- Bērze Parish
- Biksti Parish
- Dobele city
- Dobele Parish
- Īle Parish
- Jaunbērze Parish
- Krimūna Parish
- Lielauce Parish
- Naudīte Parish
- Penkule Parish
- Tērvete municipality
- Ukri Parish
- Vītiņi Parish
- Zebrene Parish
