= Auce Municipality =

Former municipality of Latvia

Coordinates: 56.5000°N 22.9500°E

Auce Municipality Auces novads
- Former municipality
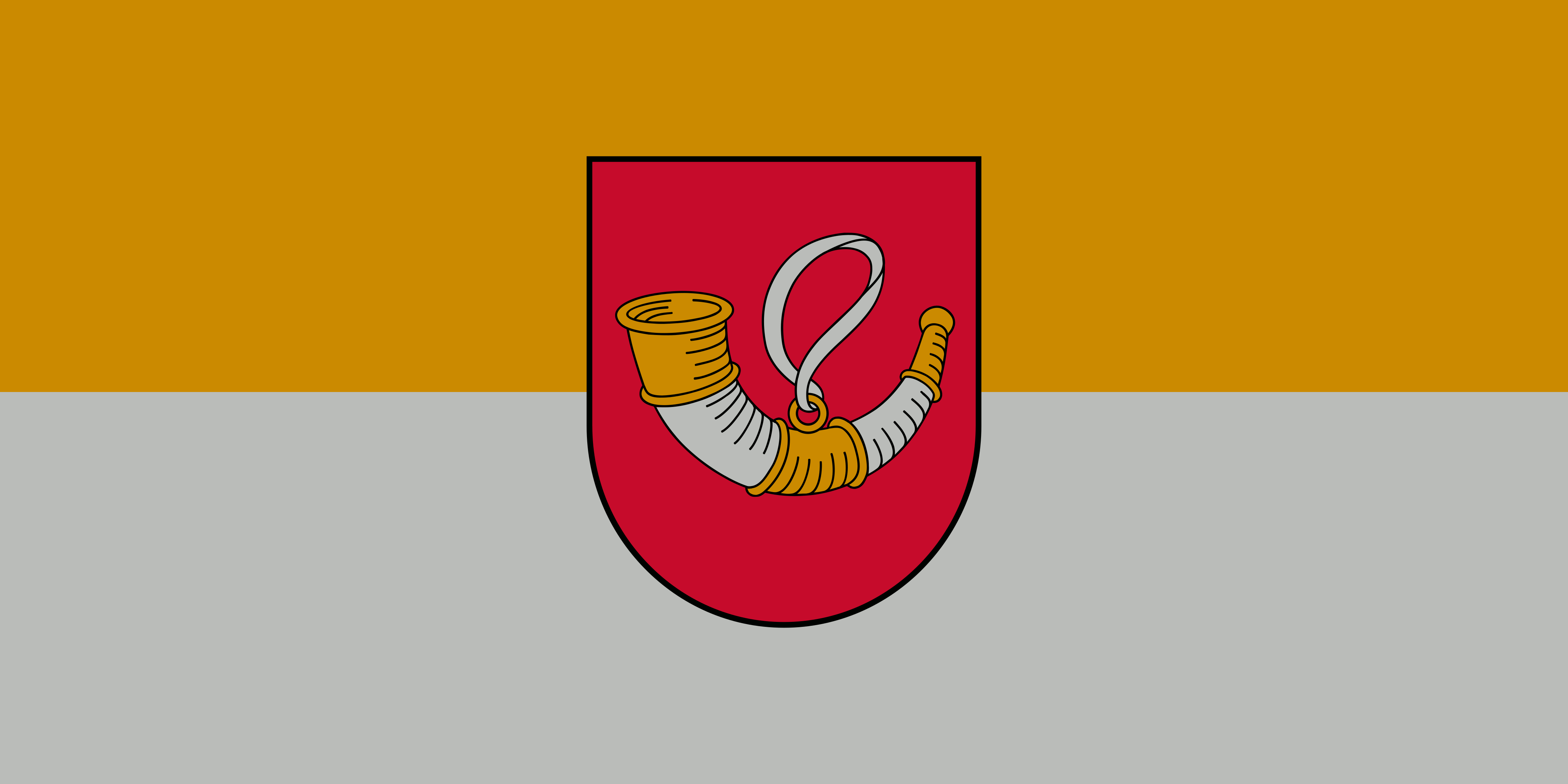
- Flag Coat of arms

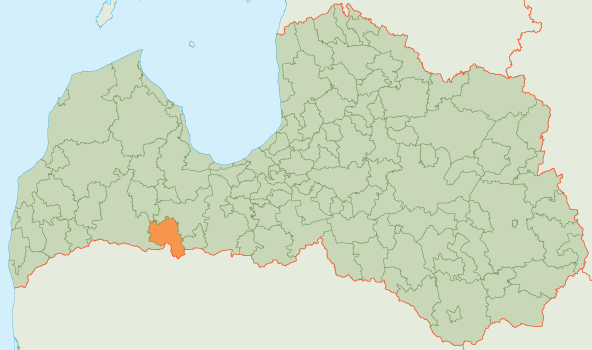
- Country: Latvia
- Established: 1 July 2009
- Dissolved: 1 July 2021
- Centre: Auce

Area
  - Total: 516.97 km^{2} (199.60 sq mi)
  - Land: 503.25 km^{2} (194.31 sq mi)
  - Water: 13.72 km^{2} (5.30 sq mi)

Population (2021)
  - Total: 6,025
  - Density: 11.97/km^{2} (31.01/sq mi)
- Website: www.auce.lv

Auce Municipality (Latvian: Auces novads) was a municipality in Semigallia, Latvia. The municipality was formed in 2009 by merging parts of the dissolved Dobele district: Bēne Parish, Lielauce Parish, Ukri Parish, Vītiņi Parish, Īle Parish and Auce town with its countryside territory (which later became Vecauce Parish). The administrative center was Auce.

On 1 July 2021, Auce Municipality ceased to exist and its territory was merged into Dobele Municipality.

== Twin towns — sister cities ==
Auce was twinned with:

- Akmenė, Lithuania
- Joniškis, Lithuania
- Bryansk, Russia

== See also ==
- Administrative divisions of Latvia
