= Krustpils Municipality =

Municipality of Latvia

Coordinates: 56°30′N 25°51′E

Krustpils Municipality Krustpils novads
- Municipality
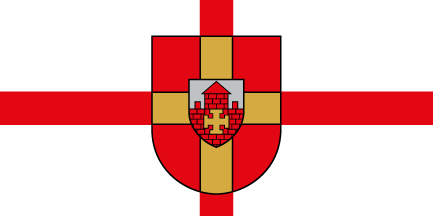
- Flag Coat of arms

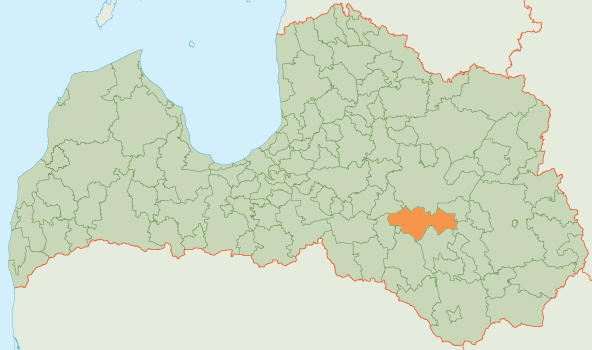
- Country: Latvia
- Formed: 2021
- Centre: Jēkabpils (extraterritorially)

Government
  - Chairman: Kārlis Pabērzs (V)

Area
  - Total: 811.73 km^{2} (313.41 sq mi)
  - Land: 789.49 km^{2} (304.82 sq mi)
  - Water: 22.24 km^{2} (8.59 sq mi)

Population (2021)
  - Total: 5,461
  - Density: 6.917/km^{2} (17.92/sq mi)
- Website: www.krustpils.lv

Krustpils Municipality (Latvian: Krustpils novads) is a former municipality in Latgale, Latvia. The municipality was formed in 2009 by merging Atašiene parish, Krustpils parish, Kūkas parish, Mežāre parish, Varieši parish and Vīpe parish. The administrative centre was located in Jēkabpils city, which was not included in the territory of the municipality.

Parts of Teiči Nature Reserve were located in Krustpils Municipality.

On 1 July 2021, Krustpils Municipality ceased to exist and its territory was merged into Jēkabpils Municipality.

== See also ==
- Administrative divisions of Latvia (2009)
