= Skrunda (disambiguation) =

Skrunda may refer to:

- Skrunda, a town in Latvia
- Skrunda-1, a ghost town in Latvia and former Soviet radar station
- Skrunda-class patrol boat, a class of SWATH patrol vessels used by the Latvian Navy
- Skrunda Municipality, a municipality in Courland, Latvia
- Skrunda Parish, an administrative unit of the Skrunda Municipality, Latvia
- Skrunda Station, a railway station on the Jelgava – Liepāja Railway in Latvia
