= Sīpele =

Village in Latvia

Coordinates: 56°41′N 23°18′E

Sīpele is a village in the western part of Jaunbērze Parish of Dobele Municipality in Semigallia region and the Zemgale Planning Region in Latvia.

Before the administrative-territorial reforms concluded in 2009, it was located in Dobele district.
