= Lielauce Manor =

Manor house in Latvia

Coordinates: 56°31′25″N 22°53′42″E

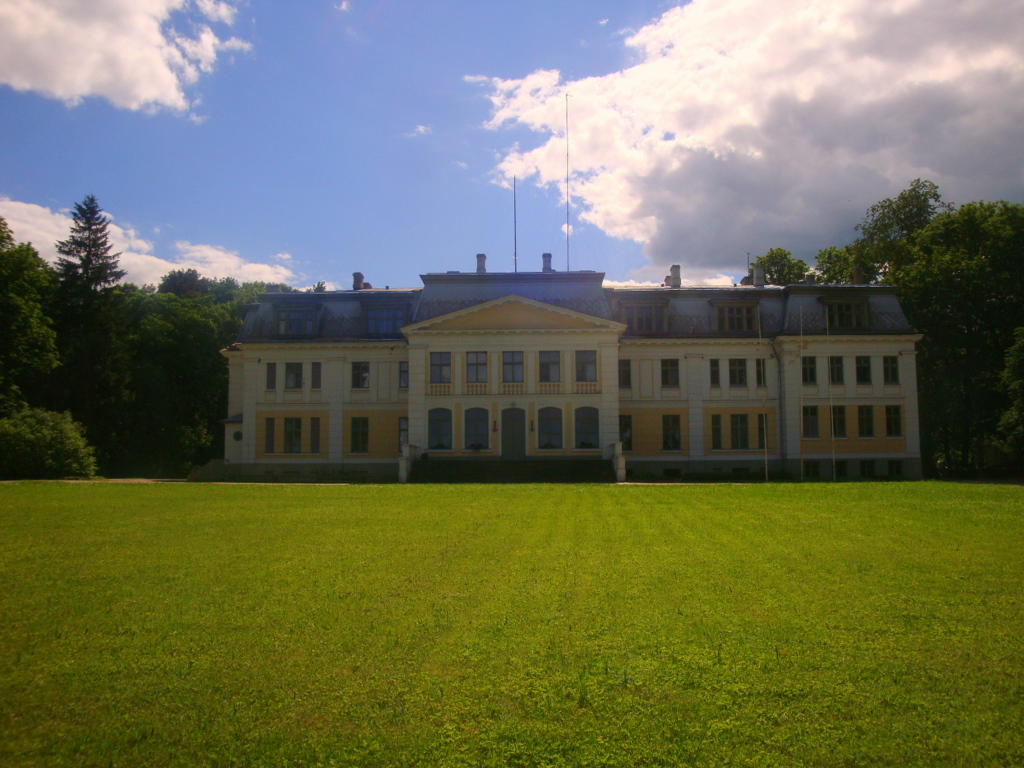
- Interactive map of the Lielauce Manor area

General information
- Architectural style: Classicism
- Location: Lielauce Parish, Dobele Municipality, Latvia
- Completed: Beginning of 19th. century.
- Client: von Medem family

Lielauce Manor (Latvian: Lielauces muiža, German: Groß-Autz) is a manor house built in late classical or Empire style in the 19th century for Count Medem on the south shore of Lielauce Lake, in Lielauce Parish, Dobele Municipality, in the Semigallia region Latvia.

== History ==
Lielauce manor in 17th century was owned by Duke of Courland and Semigallia Friedrich Kettler who in 1624, together with all his court lived in the manor. Current manor building was rebuilt in the beginning of the 19th century, when it was bought by von Medem family. At the end of the 19th century, the property was bought by count von Pahlen as his summer residence. During Christmas of 1900, the manor building was heavily damaged by fire. In 1901, its restoration work started. As a result, the building got more Neo - Classical appearance. After Latvian agrarian reforms of 1920, the manor building was used as a school. Today the building is owned by Latvia University of Life Sciences and Technologies. Interiors are preserved in several rooms.

== See also ==
- List of palaces and manor houses in Latvia
