= Ceriņi =

Village in Latvia

Coordinates: 56.6125°N 23.3000°E

Ceriņi is a village in the Krimūna Parish of Dobele Municipality in Semigallia region and the Zemgale Planning Region in Latvia. The population was 125 as of 2024.
