= Latgale Party =

Political party in Latvia

Latgale Party Latgales partija
- Abbreviation: LP
- Leader: Jānis Lāčplēsis; Aldis Adamovičs
- Founded: June 1, 2012
- Ideology: Latgale regionalism; Latgalian minority interests
- National affiliation: New Unity
- Colours: Blue; Maroon
- Saeima: 0 / 100
- Mayors of Latgale: 1 / 10

Website
- latgalespartija.lv

The Latgale Party (Latvian: Latgales partija, Latgalian: Latgolys parteja, LP) is a regionalist political party in Latvia representing the Latgalian minority of Latvia. It cooperates with the New Unity coalition and since 2014, it has been led by Jānis Lāčplēsis and Aldis Adamovičs.

== History ==
The party was founded on 1 June 2012 in Preiļi and registered on 28 August the same year. The stated intention of the party was to represent the interest of Latgalian citizens on a state level.

At the 2013 municipal elections, the party received the most seats in the municipalities of Ludza, Preiļi, and Viļaka as well as being tied for most seats with Harmony Centre in Daugavpils and with the Union of Greens and Farmers in Riebiņi Municipality. (Note: In Preiļu Municipality, the party ran on a joint list with the National Alliance and the Latvian Farmers' Union.)

Ahead of the 2018 parliamentary elections, the party joined the newly founded New Unity party alliance. Despite this, some party candidates chose to run on the lists of KPV LV and the Progressives due to agreements within the individual local party chapters.

== Election results ==
=== Legislative elections ===
Election	Leader	Performance					Rank	Government
Election	Leader	Votes	%	± pp	Seats	+/–	Rank	Government
2018 (Note: The New Unity list won 8 seats; 7 went to Unity and 1 to Latgale Party)	Krišjānis Kariņš	56,542	6.74	New	1 / 100	New	7th	Coalition
2022 (Note: The New Unity list won 26 seats; 23 went to Unity, 1 to For Kuldīga Municipality, 1 to For Valmiera and Vidzeme and 1 to an independent)	Krišjānis Kariņš	173,425	19.19	▲12.45	0 / 100	▼1	▲1st	Extra-parliamentary

=== European Parliament elections ===
Election	List leader	Votes	%	Seats	+/–	EP Group
2019 (Note: The New Unity list won 2 seats, both of which went to Unity (Latvia))	Valdis Dombrovskis	124,193	26.40 (#1)	0 / 8	New	–
2024	Valdis Dombrovskis	130,563	25.37 (#1)	0 / 9	0	–
