= Jānis Lācis =

Twentieth century Latvian soldier

- Born: February 20, 1897; Jaunpiebalga Municipality, Kreis Wenden, Governorate of Livonia, Russian Empire (Now Latvia)
- Died: March 10, 1937 (aged 40) Khabarovsk, Soviet Union
- Allegiance: Russian Empire; Soviet Union
- Branch: Imperial Russian Army; Soviet Red Army
- Service years: 1916–1917 (Russian Empire); 1917–1937 (Soviet Union)
- Rank: Komkor
- Commands: 15th Rifle Division; 16th Rifle Corps
- Conflicts: World War I Russian Civil War

Jānis Lācis (Russian: Ян Я́нович Ла́цис, Yan Yanovich Latsis; February 20, 1897 – March 10, 1937) was a Latvian Riflemen, later Soviet division commander and Komkor (corps commander). He was the first commander of the Special Corps of Railroad Guards.

Lacis fought in the 4th Vidzeme Latvian Riflemen Regiment of the Imperial Russian Army in World War I before going over to the Bolsheviks in the subsequent civil war. He was a recipient of the Order of Lenin and the Order of the Red Banner. From 1932 to 1937, he commanded the troops guarding the railways of Siberia and the Far East. He was simultaneously a member of the Central Executive Committee of the Russian Soviet Federative Socialist Republic. He died of an illness in Khabarovsk. He is buried at Novodevichy Cemetery.

Military offices
Preceded by Division created	Commander of the 15th Rifle Division; June 1918 – November 1919	Succeeded by Alexander Sirotkin
Preceded by	Commander of the 16th Rifle Corps; 1930-1931	Succeeded by Georgy Sofronov
