= Līgatne =

Town in Cēsis Municipality, Latvia

- Town
- Coat of arms

- Location in Latvia
- Coordinates: 57°14′N 25°03′E
- Country: Latvia
- Municipality: Cēsis Municipality
- Town privileges: 1993

Area
  - Total: 7.07 km^{2} (2.73 sq mi)
  - Land: 6.85 km^{2} (2.64 sq mi)
  - Water: 0.22 km^{2} (0.085 sq mi)

Population (2026)
  - Total: 1,014
  - Density: 148/km^{2} (383/sq mi)
- Time zone: UTC+2 (EET)
  - Summer (DST): UTC+3 (EEST)
- Postal code: LV-4110
- Area code: +371 641
- Website: ligatne.lv

Līgatne (German: Ligat) is a town in Līgatne Parish, Cēsis Municipality in the Vidzeme region of Latvia. It is situated on the Gauja River. The village of Līgatne was built around the paper mill, still extant, on the River Līgatne in the 19th century. Later it grew into a town and was then awarded city status in 1993.

== Līgatne Nature Trails ==
The reserve known as the Līgatne Nature Trails is also located here, in the Gauja National Park, in the forest on the left bank of the Gauja River downstream from the paper mill. There are extensive paths through the nature reserve both for walking and for cycling, and there is a separate route for cars. There are also facilities for horse-riding and camping.

The reserve was set up in 1975 for the protection and display of the diversity of species, both plant and animal, which are characteristic of Latvia.

The animals here have been rescued from all over Latvia, either because they were injured, or because they had been tamed and could not survive on their own in the wild. The reserve contains bear, lynx, elk, European bison, roe deer and red deer.

The Gauja river valley contains distinctive geological formations, forests and meadow plants. Particularly significant places are Jumpraviezis rock, Katrīniezis rock, Gūdu cliffs and one of the country's rare sandstone canyons: Paparžu grava ("Fern Glen"), known for its ferns.

Līgatne has numerous caves in vertical sandstone banks, that were dug as cellars for paper mill workers during the time of the Russian Empire.

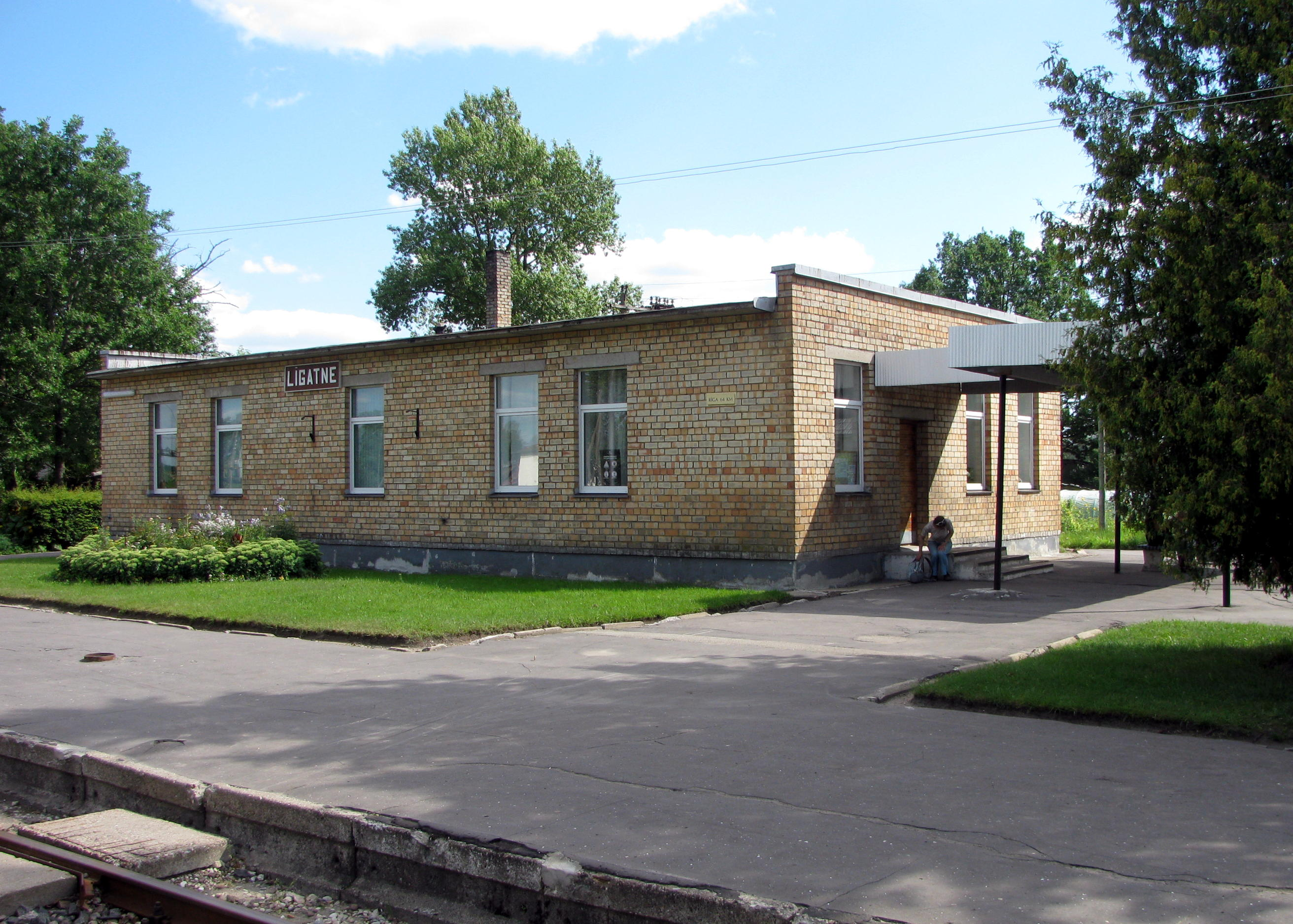
Līgatne railway station

== Nearby places of interest ==
- Ferry across the Gauja River (closed in winter)
- Līgatne, with peculiar 19th century wooden architecture (30 unique row dwelling houses for paper mill workers)
- Līgatne paper mill, in operation 1816–2016, now available for industrial tourism
- Zvārtes rock, forest trail and Witches' Meadow on the banks of the Amata River
- Ķempji village church and water mill
- Skaļupes nature trails
- Vienkoči Park
