= Rucava Municipality =

Municipality of Latvia

Coordinates: 56°09′33″N 21°09′43″E

Rucava Municipality Rucavas novads
- Municipality
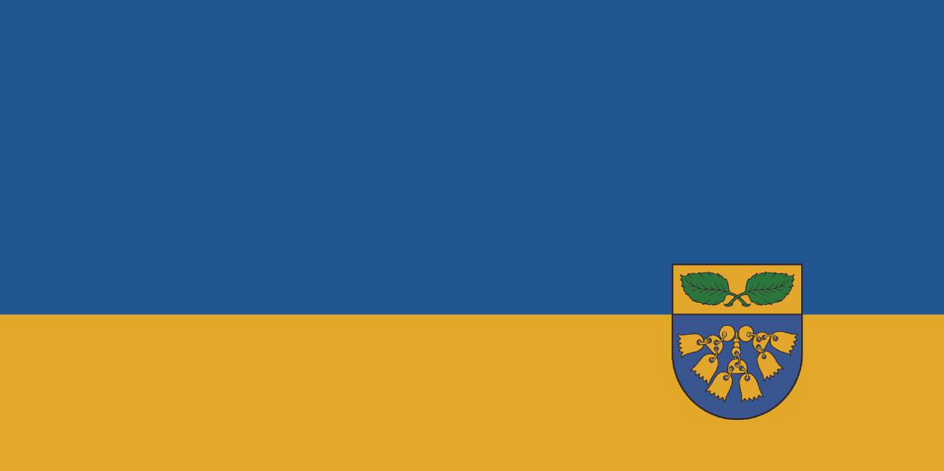
- Flag Coat of arms

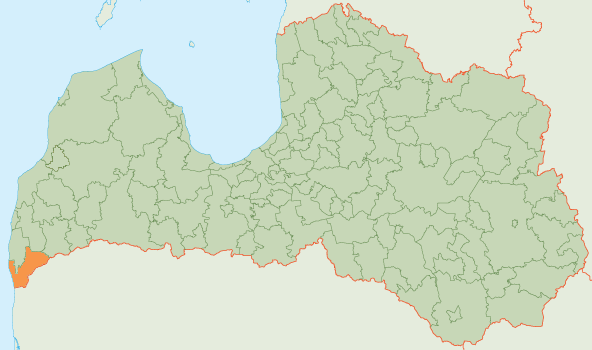
- Country: Latvia
- Formed: 2009
- Centre: Rucava

Government
  - Council Chair: Jānis Veits (For The Development of the Municipality)

Area
  - Total: 448.16 km^{2} (173.04 sq mi)
  - Land: 434.43 km^{2} (167.73 sq mi)
  - Water: 13.73 km^{2} (5.30 sq mi)

Population (2021)
  - Total: 1,505
  - Density: 3.464/km^{2} (8.973/sq mi)

Rucava Municipality (Latvian: Rucavas novads) is a former municipality in Courland, Latvia. The municipality was formed in 2009 by merging Dunika Parish and Rucava Parish, the administrative centre being Rucava. The population in 2020 was 1,451.

Rucava Municipality ceased to exist on 1 July 2021, when it was merged into the newly formed South Kurzeme Municipality.

== See also ==
- Administrative divisions of Latvia (2009)
