= Skrunda Municipality =

Municipality of Latvia

Coordinates: 56°40′N 22°00′E

Skrunda Municipality Skrundas novads
- Municipality
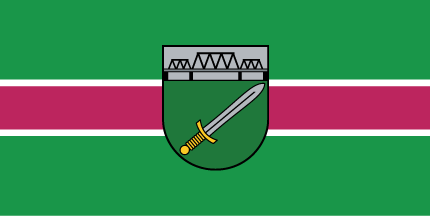
- Flag Coat of arms

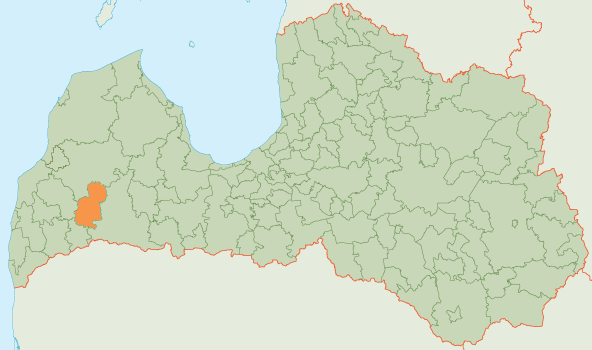
- Country: Latvia
- Dissolved: 2021
- Centre: Skrunda

Area
  - Total: 556.85 km^{2} (215.00 sq mi)
  - Land: 537.93 km^{2} (207.70 sq mi)
  - Water: 18.92 km^{2} (7.31 sq mi)

Population (2021)
  - Total: 4,526
  - Density: 8.414/km^{2} (21.79/sq mi)
- Website: www.skrunda.lv

Skrunda Municipality (Latvian: Skrundas novads) was a municipality in Courland, Latvia. The municipality was formed in 2009 by merging Skrunda town with its countryside territory, Raņķi parish, Nīkrāce parish and Rudbārži parish; the administrative centre being Skrunda. The population in 2020 was 4,543.

On 1 July 2021, Skrunda Municipality ceased to exist and its territory was merged into Kuldīga Municipality.

== See also ==
- Administrative divisions of Latvia (2009)
