= Riebiņi Municipality =

Former municipality of Latvia

Coordinates: 56°20′29″N 26°48′04″E

Riebiņi Municipality Riebiņu novads
- Municipality
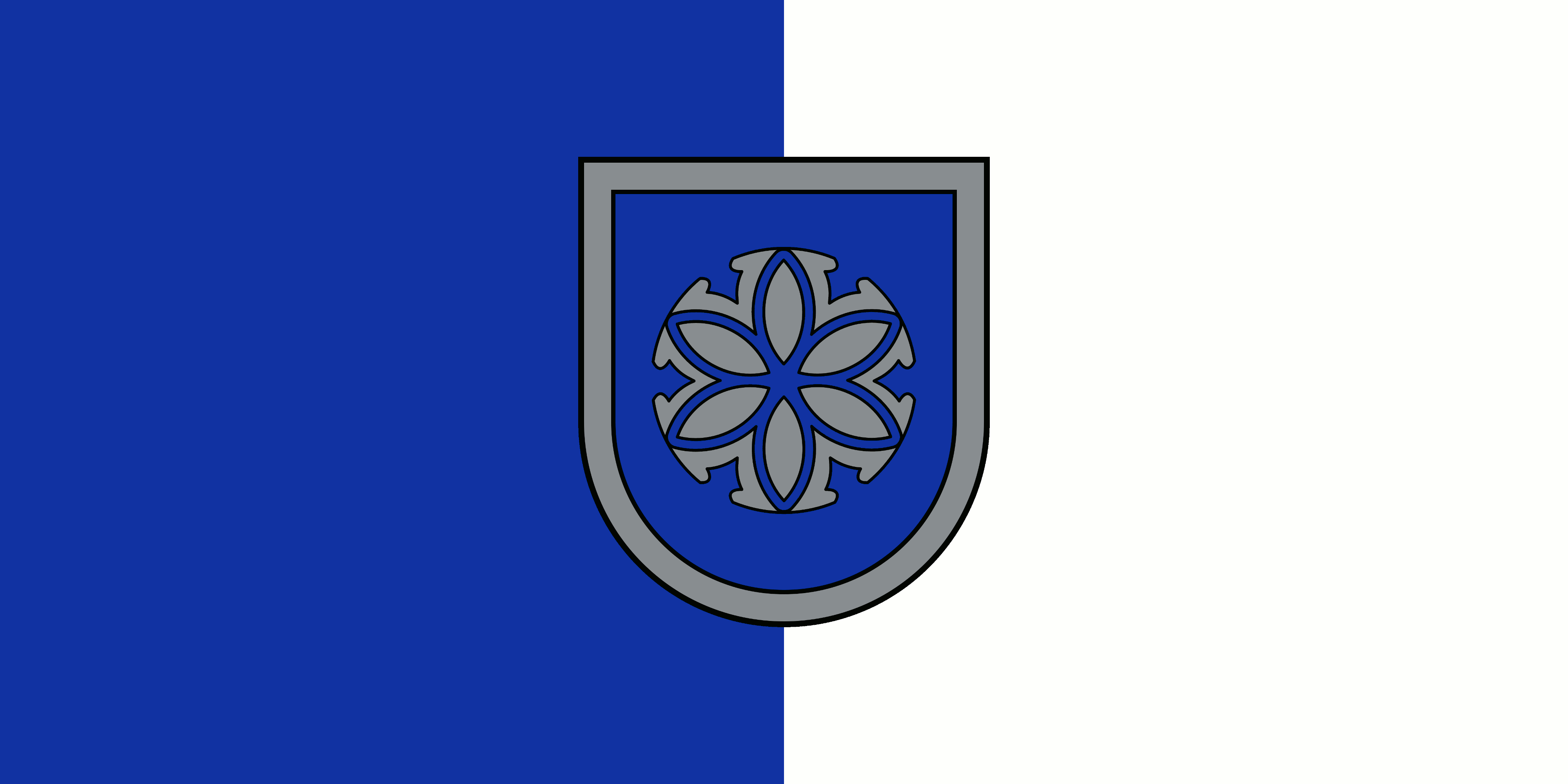
- Flag Coat of arms

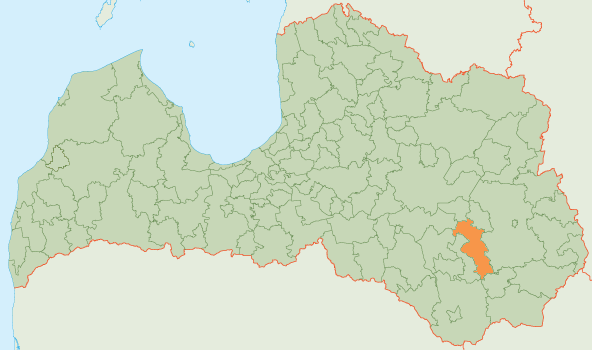
- Country: Latvia
- Formed: 2004
- Dissolved: 2021
- Centre: Riebiņi

Government
  - Council Chair (last): Pēteris Rožinskis (LZP)

Area
  - Total: 629.74 km^{2} (243.14 sq mi)
  - Land: 589.99 km^{2} (227.80 sq mi)
  - Water: 39.75 km^{2} (15.35 sq mi)

Population (2021)
  - Total: 4,466
  - Density: 7.570/km^{2} (19.61/sq mi)
- Website: www.riebini.lv

Riebiņi Municipality (Latvian: Riebiņu novads, Latgalian: Ribinišku nūvods) is a former municipality in Latgale, Latvia. The municipality was formed in 2004 by merging Galēni Parish, Riebiņi Parish, Rušona Parish, Silajāņi Parish, Sīļukalns Parish and Stabulnieki Parish. The administrative centre was Riebiņi. The population in 2020 was 4,513.

On 1 July 2021, Riebiņi Municipality ceased to exist and its territory was merged into Preiļi Municipality.

== See also ==
- Administrative divisions of Latvia
