= Bukaiši Parish =

Parish of Latvia

- parish of Latvia
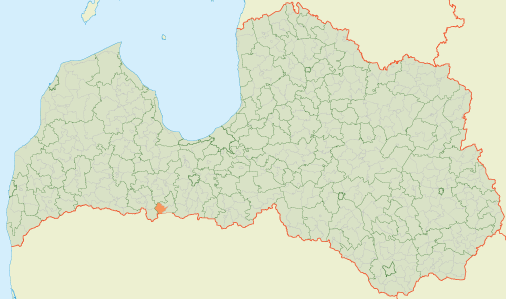
- 56°24′46″N 23°13′12″E
- Country: Latvia

Area
  - Total: 66.75 km^{2} (25.77 sq mi)
  - Land: 65.54 km^{2} (25.31 sq mi)
  - Water: 1.21 km^{2} (0.47 sq mi)

Population (1 January 2024)
  - Total: 525
  - Density: 7.9/km^{2} (20/sq mi)

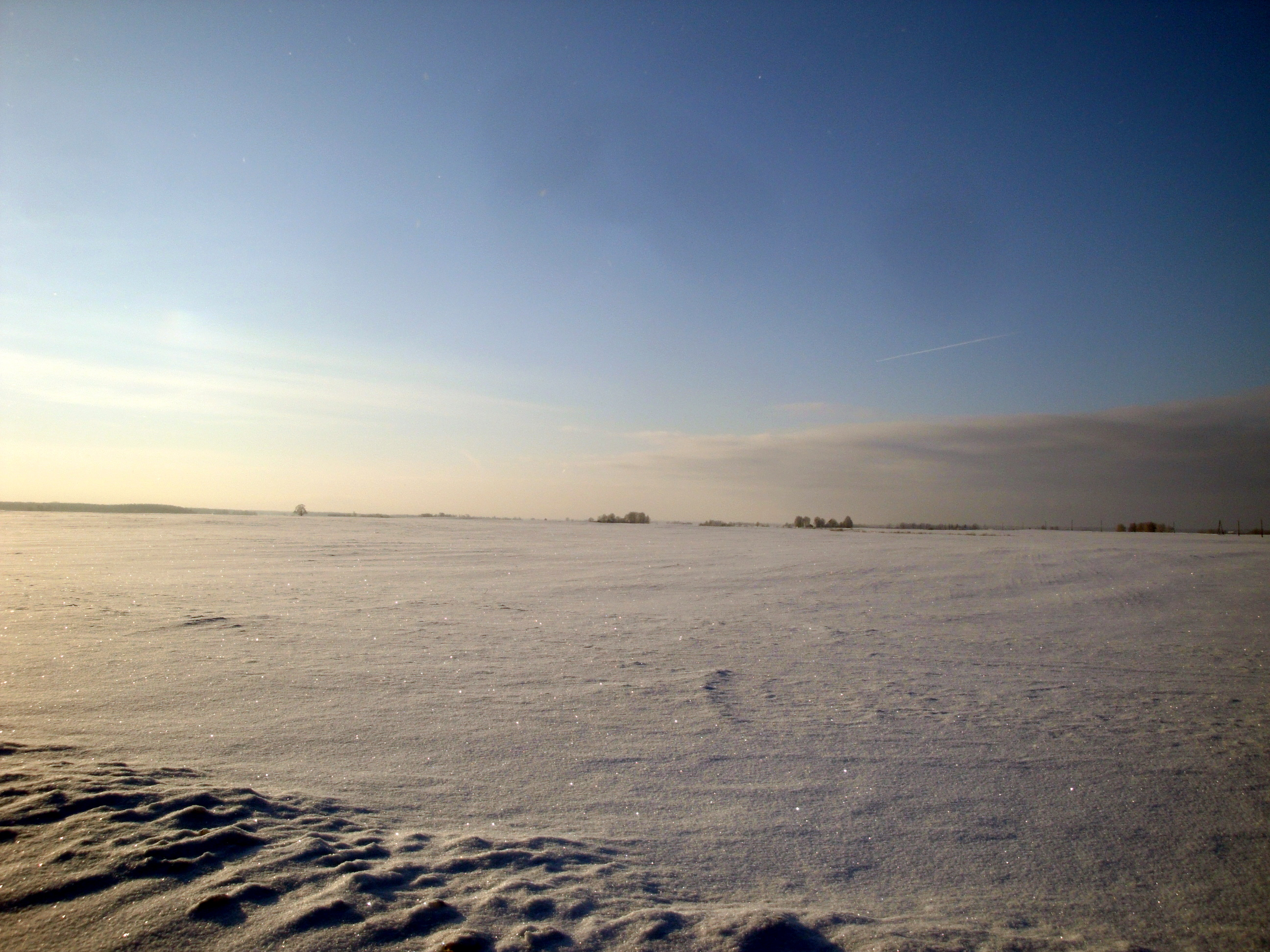
Beach in Bukaiši Parish

Bukaiši Parish (Latvian: Bukaišu pagasts) is an administrative unit of Dobele Municipality in the Semigallia region of Latvia. At the beginning of 2014, the population of the parish was 745. The administrative center is Bukaiši village.

== Towns, villages and settlements of Bukaiši parish ==
- Bukaiši
- Kārklumuiža
- Medne
- Rociņas
