= Rūdolfs Gaitars =

Latvian SS officer

- Rūdolfs Gaitars in 1945
- Born: 29 May 1907; Penkule Parish, Russian Empire
- Died: 22 March 1945 (aged 37); Zante Parish, Ostland
- Military career
- Allegiance: Latvia; Nazi Germany
- Branch: Waffen SS
- Service years: 1942–1945
- Rank: Obersturmführer
- Unit: 19th Waffen Grenadier Division of the SS (2nd Latvian)
- Conflicts: World War II
- Awards: Iron Cross I Class; Iron Cross II Class; Infantry Assault Badge; German Cross (in Gold); Close Combat Clasp (in bronze and silver); Wound Badge

Rūdolfs Gaitars (29 May 1907 – 22 March 1945) was a Waffen-Obersturmführer in the Waffen SS during World War II. He was the first Latvian to be awarded the German Cross in Gold.

== Pre-War Life ==
Gaitars was born on 29 May 1907 in Penkule Parish, Semigallia. Before the war he worked as school administrator in a local Penkule primary school.

== In the Second World War ==
He was dismissed from his school post in September 1940, following the Soviet occupation of Latvia. He then served in the Latvian army and reached the rank of warrant officer. During the Soviet mass deportations on 14 June 1941 Gaitars was on the deportee list, but hid in a forest. His family was sent to Siberia.

After Operation Barbarossa started in June 1941, Gaitars organised armed units in Penkule. Together with ex-members of the Aizsargi (home guard) he set up checkpoints on roads and arrested Soviet activists and politicians. Gaitars became Commandant of the Penkule parish. In May 1942 he enlisted in the 19th Latgale Police battalion and was deployed on the Eastern front. He participated in fighting at the Leningrad front, near the Pulkovo observatory, where the battalion suffered heavy casualties.

In April 1943 the remnants of the 19th Battalion were included in the 2nd Waffen SS brigade and deployed to the Volchov front. Gaitars was promoted to the rank of Untersturmführer and in August 1943 was awarded the Iron Cross 2nd Class, followed by the 1st Class award in October.

In February 1944 Gaitars'company repelled the attack of a battalion-sized Soviet unit and later destroyed a Soviet military column near Zapolje. For gallantry during these actions, in May 1944 Gaitars became the first Latvian to be awarded the German Cross in Gold.

His company remained fighting throughout the summer and autumn of 1944 during the German withdrawal from Russia into Latvia. Gaitars was seriously wounded during fighting in the Courland Pocket and was forced to leave the frontline until January 1945. On March 22, 1945 he was once more seriously wounded and died of his wounds in a field hospital in Zante near Tukums. Rūdolfs Gaitars was buried in a small rural cemetery near the homestead of ‘’Dārziņi’’.
