= Jānis Lāčplēsis =

Latvian financier and politician

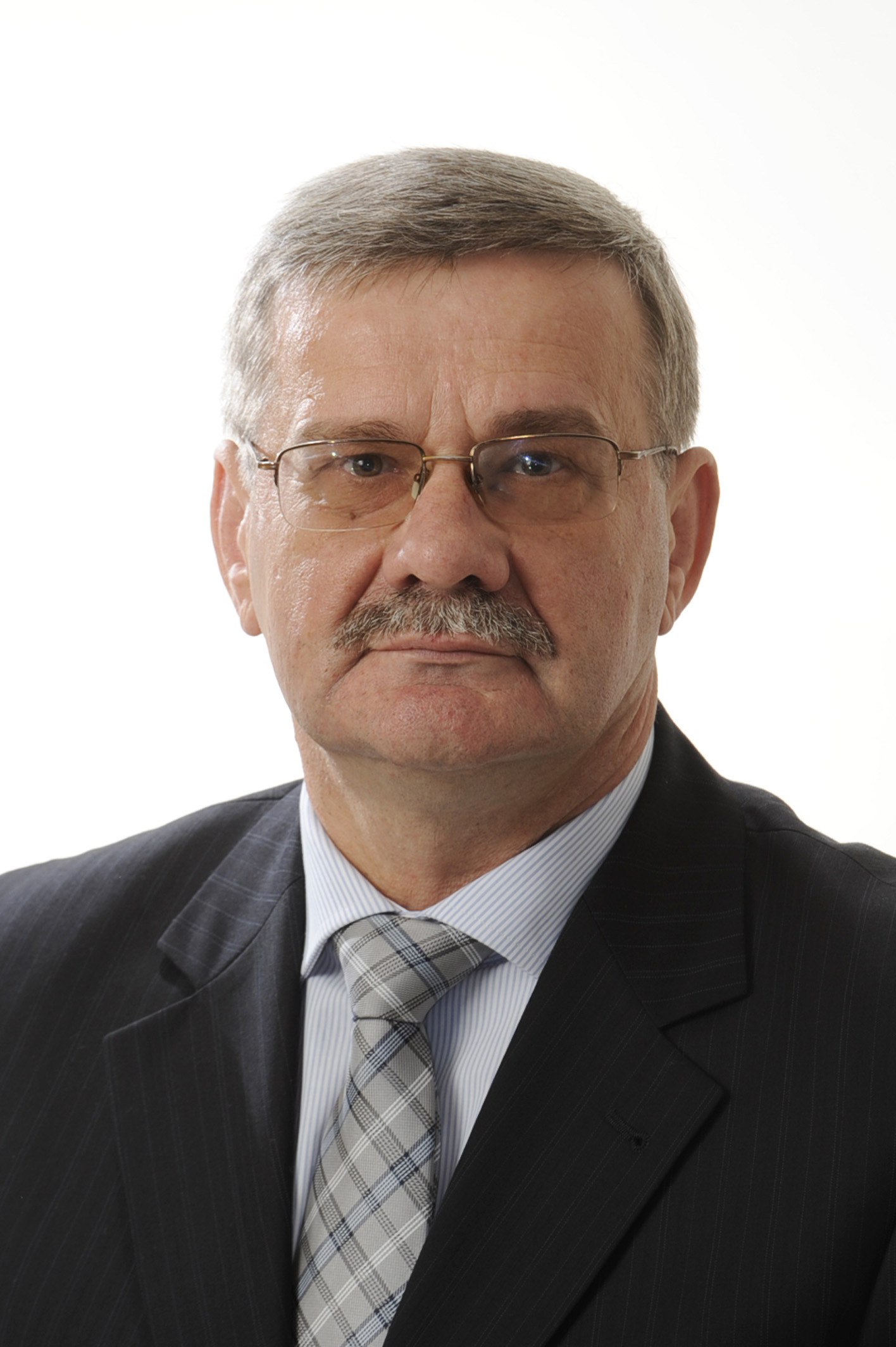

Mayor of Daugavpils
- In office 28 September 2009 – 24 March 2011
- Preceded by: Rihards Eigims
- Succeeded by: Žanna Kulakova
- In office 1 July 2013 – 26 June 2017
- Preceded by: Žanna Kulakova
- Succeeded by: Andrejs Elksniņš

Personal details
- Born: October 8, 1958 (age 67) Daugavpils, Latvia
- Party: Latvian Way; Latvia's First Party/Latvian Way; Latgale Party
- Education: Riga Technical University

Jānis Lāčplēsis (born 8 October 1958 in Daugavpils) is a Latvian financier, politician and former mayor of Daugavpils (2009-2011, 2013-2017). He was a member of the Latvian parliament during the 7th Saeima and the 11th Saeima.
