= Rauna Municipality =

Municipality of Latvia

Coordinates: 57°19′56″N 25°36′35″E

Rauna Municipality Raunas novads
- Municipality
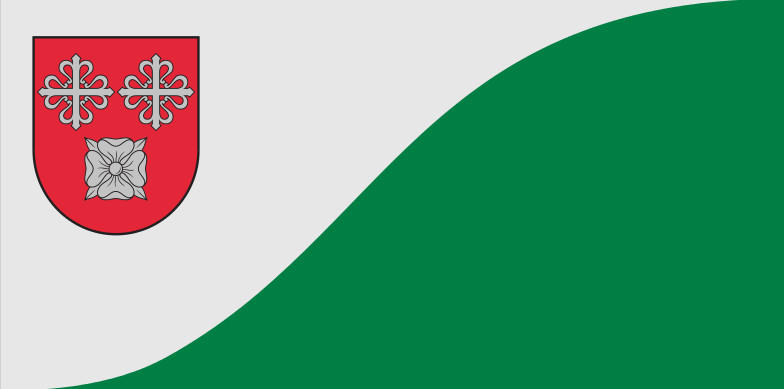
- Flag Coat of arms

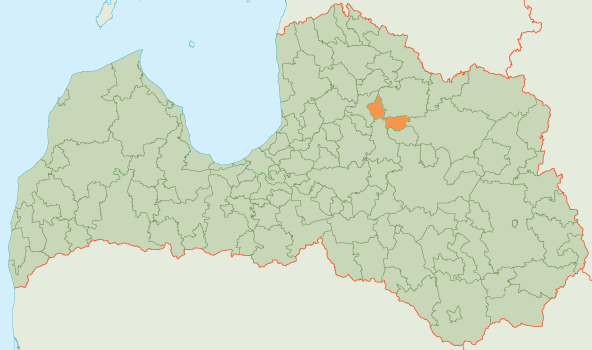
- Country: Latvia
- Formed: 2009
- Centre: Rauna

Government
  - Council Chair: Evija Zurģe (We - For Our Municipality)

Area
  - Total: 309.01 km^{2} (119.31 sq mi)
  - Land: 301.11 km^{2} (116.26 sq mi)
  - Water: 7.9 km^{2} (3.1 sq mi)

Population (2021)
  - Total: 3,005
  - Density: 9.980/km^{2} (25.85/sq mi)
- Website: www.rauna.lv

Rauna Municipality (Latvian: Raunas novads) is a former municipality in Vidzeme, Latvia. The municipality was formed in 2009 by merging Drusti parish and Rauna parish, the administrative centre being Rauna. The population in 2020 was 3,019.

On 1 July 2021, Rauna Municipality ceased to exist and its territory was merged into Smiltene Municipality.

== See also ==
- Administrative divisions of Latvia (2009)
