= Preiļi Parish =

Administrative unit in Latvia

- parish of Latvia
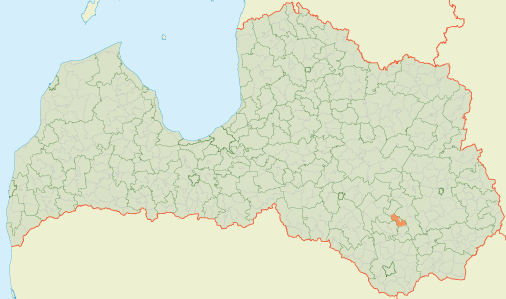
- Coordinates: 56°17′08″N 26°41′41″E
- Country: Latvia

Population (1 January 2026)
  - Total: 842

Preiļi parish is an administrative unit of Preiļi Municipality, Latvia.
