= Stabulnieki Parish =

Parish of Latvia

- parish of Latvia
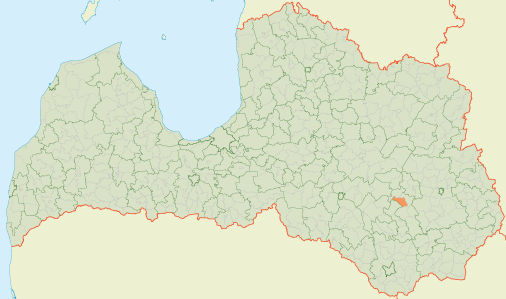
- 56°26′33″N 26°44′33″E
- Country: Latvia

Area
  - Total: 67.37 km^{2} (26.01 sq mi)
  - Land: 65.98 km^{2} (25.48 sq mi)
  - Water: 1.39 km^{2} (0.54 sq mi)

Population (1 January 2024)
  - Total: 589
  - Density: 8.7/km^{2} (23/sq mi)

Stabulnieki Parish (Latvian: Stabulnieku pagasts, Latgalian: Stabuļnīku pogosts) is an administrative unit of Preiļi Municipality in the Latgale region of Latvia. At the beginning of 2014, the population of the parish was 832. The administrative center is Stabulnieki village.

== Towns, villages and settlements of Stabulnieki Parish ==
- Pastari
- Polkorona
- Stabulnieki
- Ūgaiņi-Puduļi
