= Sauna Parish =

Parish of Latvia

- parish of Latvia
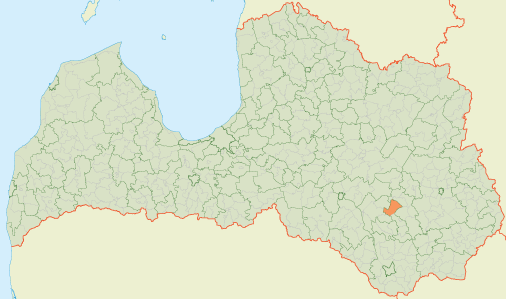
- Coordinates: 56°23′38″N 26°37′07″E
- Country: Latvia

Population (1 January 2026)
  - Total: 692

Sauna Parish (Latvian: Saunas pagasts) is an administrative unit of Preiļi Municipality, Latvia and previously the Preiļi district.

== Towns, villages and settlements of Sauna Parish ==
- Prīkuļi – parish administrative center
