= Pāvilosta Municipality =

Municipality of Latvia

Coordinates: 56°53′N 21°10′E

Pāvilosta Municipality Pāvilostas novads
- Municipality
- Coat of arms

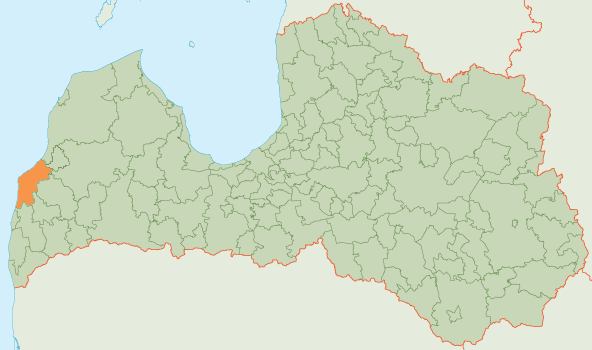
- Country: Latvia
- Formed: 2009
- Centre: Pāvilosta

Government
  - Council Chair: Uldis Kristapsons (We For Our Municipality)

Area
  - Total: 514.97 km^{2} (198.83 sq mi)
  - Land: 504.84 km^{2} (194.92 sq mi)
  - Water: 10.13 km^{2} (3.91 sq mi)

Population (2021)
  - Total: 2,543
  - Density: 5.037/km^{2} (13.05/sq mi)
- Website: www.pavilosta.lv

Pāvilosta Municipality (Latvian: Pāvilostas novads) is a former municipality in Courland, Latvia. The municipality was formed in 2009 by merging Pāvilosta town, Saka parish and Vērgale parish the administrative centre being Pāvilosta. The population in 2020 was 2,524.

Pāvilosta Municipality ceased to exist on 1 July 2021, when it was merged into the newly formed South Kurzeme Municipality.

== See also ==
- Administrative divisions of Latvia (2009)
