= Galēni Parish =

Parish of Latvia

- parish of Latvia
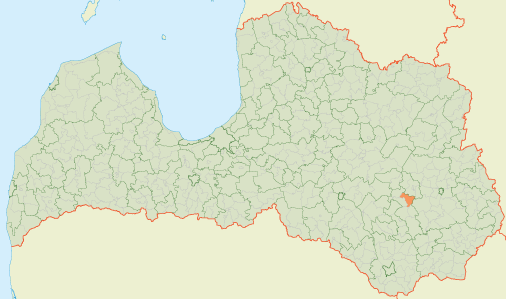
- 56°27′31″N 26°50′54″E
- Country: Latvia

Area
  - Total: 80.05 km^{2} (30.91 sq mi)
  - Land: 80.05 km^{2} (30.91 sq mi)
  - Water: 1.31 km^{2} (0.51 sq mi)

Population (1 January 2024)
  - Total: 616
  - Density: 7.7/km^{2} (20/sq mi)

Galēni Parish (Latvian: Galēnu pagasts, Latgalian: Vydsmuižys pogosts) is an administrative unit of Preiļi Municipality in the Latgale region of Latvia. At the beginning of 2014, the population of the parish was 890. The administrative center is Galēni village.

== Towns, villages and settlements of Galēni parish ==
- Galēni
- Gribolva
- Indāni
- Lomi-Bortnieki
- Maltas Trūpi
- Voveres
