= Jaunpiebalga Municipality =

Municipality of Latvia

Coordinates: 57°10′36″N 26°02′07″E

Jaunpiebalga Municipality Jaunpiebalgas novads
- Former municipality
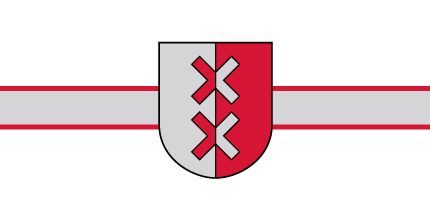
- Flag Coat of arms

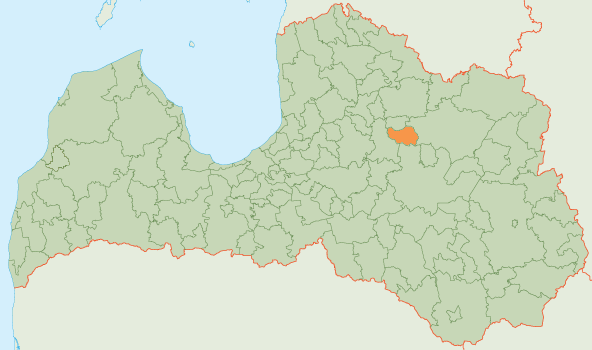
- Country: Latvia
- Formed: 2009
- Centre: Jaunpiebalga

Government
  - Chairman: Laimis Šāvējs (LZS)

Area
  - Total: 251.23 km^{2} (97.00 sq mi)
  - Land: 245.83 km^{2} (94.92 sq mi)
  - Water: 5.4 km^{2} (2.1 sq mi)

Population (2021)
  - Total: 1,992
  - Density: 8.103/km^{2} (20.99/sq mi)
- Website: www.jaunpiebalga.lv

Jaunpiebalga Municipality (Latvian: Jaunpiebalgas novads) is a former municipality in Vidzeme, Latvia. The municipality was formed in 2009 by merging Jaunpiebalga Parish and Zosēni Parish the administrative centre being Jaunpiebalga. As of 2020, the population was 1,982.

On 1 July 2021, Jaunpiebalga Municipality ceased to exist and its territory was merged into Cēsis Municipality.

== See also ==
- Administrative divisions of Latvia (2009)
