= Baldone Municipality =

Municipality of Latvia

Coordinates: 56°44′N 24°23′E

Baldone Municipality Baldones novads
- Former municipality
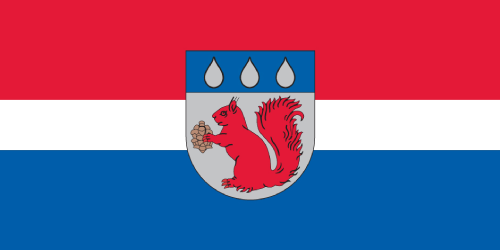
- Flag Coat of arms

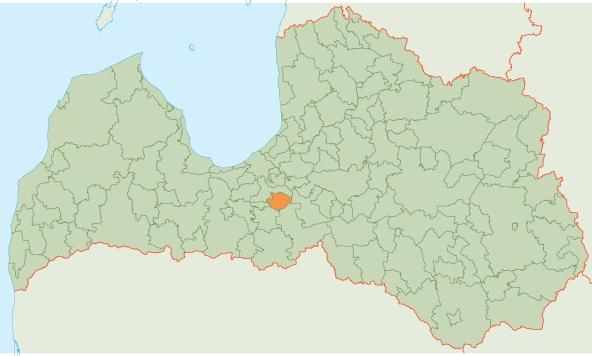
- Country: Latvia
- Formed: 2008
- Centre: Baldone

Government
  - Chairman: Raimonds Audzers (V)

Area
  - Total: 179.05 km^{2} (69.13 sq mi)
  - Land: 175.77 km^{2} (67.87 sq mi)
  - Water: 3.28 km^{2} (1.27 sq mi)

Population (2021)
  - Total: 5,446
  - Density: 30.98/km^{2} (80.25/sq mi)
- Website: www.baldone.lv

Baldone Municipality (Latvian: Baldones novads) is a former Latvian municipality situated partly in the province of Semigallia and partly in Vidzeme. The municipality was formed in 2008 by merging Baldone town and its countryside territory, with the administrative centre being Baldone. In 2010 Baldone Parish was created from the countryside territory of Baldone town.

On 1 July 2021, Baldone Municipality ceased to exist and its territory was merged into Ķekava Municipality.

== See also ==
- Administrative divisions of Latvia (2009)
