= Sīļukalns Parish =

Parish of Latvia

- parish of Latvia
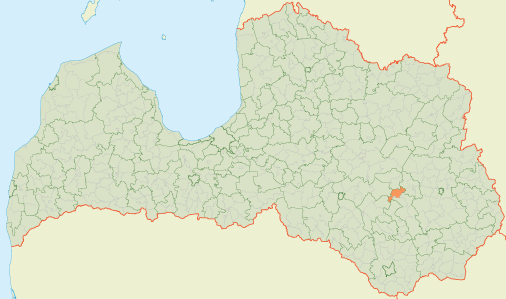
- 56°30′24″N 26°40′57″E
- Country: Latvia

Area
  - Total: 94.54 km^{2} (36.50 sq mi)
  - Land: 92.96 km^{2} (35.89 sq mi)
  - Water: 1.58 km^{2} (0.61 sq mi)

Population (1 January 2024)
  - Total: 399
  - Density: 4.2/km^{2} (11/sq mi)

Sīļukalns Parish (Latvian: Sīļukalna pagasts, Latgalian: Seiļukolna pogosts) is an administrative unit of Preiļi Municipality in the Latgale region of Latvia. At the beginning of 2014, the population of the parish was 569. The administrative center is Sīļukalns village.

== Towns, villages and settlements of Sīļukalns parish ==
- Brokas
- Grozu Bernāni
- Kapenieki
- Opolie
- Sīļukalns
- Sondori
- Sprukstiņi
- Stikāni
- Teilāni
- Upenieki
