= Baldone Parish =

Parish in Ķekava Municipality, Latvia

- parish of Latvia
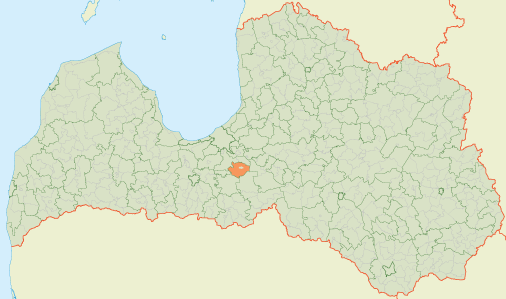
- 56°43′51″N 24°22′18″E
- Country: Latvia

Area
  - Total: 166.38 km^{2} (64.24 sq mi)
  - Land: 166.38 km^{2} (64.24 sq mi)
  - Water: 3.14 km^{2} (1.21 sq mi)

Population (1 January 2025)
  - Total: 2,061
  - Density: 12.39/km^{2} (32.08/sq mi)

Baldone Parish (Latvian: Baldones pagasts) is an administrative unit of Ķekava Municipality, Latvia. From 2009 until 2021, it was part of the former Baldone Municipality. The administrative center is the town of Baldone, which is not a part of the parish.

It was created in 2010 from the countryside territory of Baldone town. At the beginning of 2015, the population of the parish was 3322. Baldone Parish is defined by Latvian law as belonging partly to the historical lands of Vidzeme and partly to Semigallia.

The Baldone Observatory of the University of Latvia is located in the parish near the village of Riekstukalns.

== Villages and settlements ==
- Kažoki
- Mercendarbe (Mercendorfa) - center of Mencendarbe Manor
- Misa
- Pulkarne - former manor center
- Riekstukalns
- Rozītes
- Sarma
- Skurbenieši
- Spaļenieki
- Stūri
- Sūnupes
- Vārpas - former manor center
