= Vecauce Parish =

Parish in Dobele Municipality, Latvia

- parish of Latvia
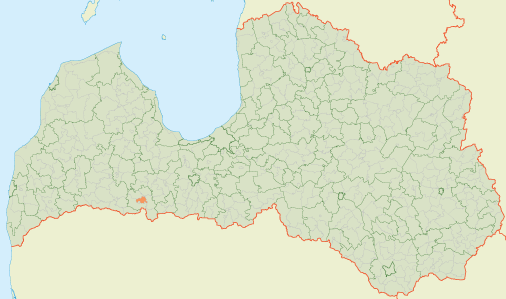
- Coordinates: 56°28′50″N 22°56′41″E
- Country: Latvia

Population (1 January 2026)
  - Total: 564

Vecauce Parish (Latvian: Vecauces pagasts) is an administrative unit of Dobele Municipality, in the Semigallia region of Latvia. Its administrative center is the village of Vecauce.

Prior to 2010 it was known as the countryside territory of the town of Auce (Auces pilsētas lauku teritorija).

== Villages and settlements ==
- Vecauce - the only village in the parish
