= Pelēči Parish =

Parish of Latvia

- parish of Latvia
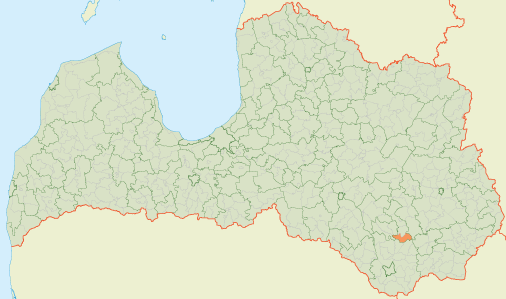
- Coordinates: 56°08′50″N 26°45′10″E
- Country: Latvia

Population (1 January 2026)
  - Total: 514

Pelēči Parish (Latvian: Pelēču pagasts) is an administrative unit of Preiļi Municipality in the Latgale region of Latvia and previously the Preiļi district.
