= Līgatne Municipality =

Municipality of Latvia

Coordinates: 57.2364°N 25.0381°E

Līgatne Municipality Līgatnes novads
- Municipality
- Coat of arms

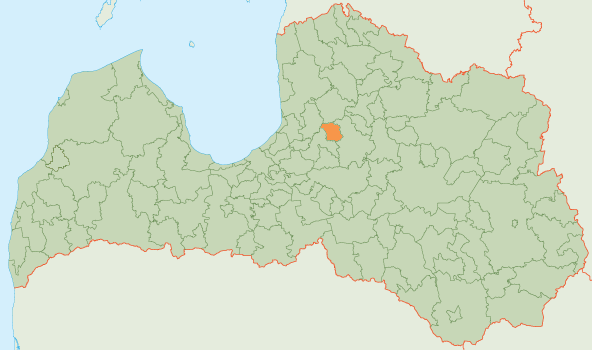
- Country: Latvia
- Formed: 2009
- Centre: Līgatne

Government
  - Council Chair: Ainārs Šteins (V)

Area
  - Total: 167.58 km^{2} (64.70 sq mi)
  - Land: 164.30 km^{2} (63.44 sq mi)
  - Water: 3.28 km^{2} (1.27 sq mi)

Population (2021)
  - Total: 3,258
  - Density: 19.83/km^{2} (51.36/sq mi)
- Website: www.ligatne.lv

Līgatne Municipality (Latvian: Līgatnes novads) is a former municipality in Vidzeme, Latvia. The municipality was formed in 2009 by merging Līgatne parish and Līgatne town, with the administrative centre being Līgatne. It has an area of 167.7 km^{2} (64.7 sq mi).

On 1 July 2021, Līgatne Municipality ceased to exist and its territory was merged into Cēsis Municipality.

== See also ==
- Administrative divisions of Latvia
