= Īle Parish =

Parish of Latvia

- parish of Latvia
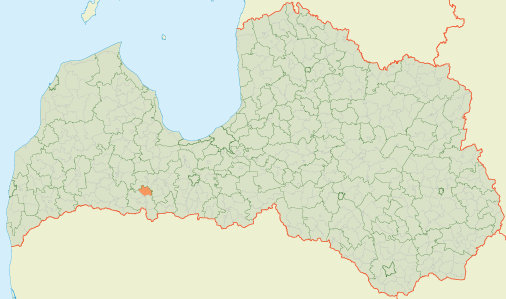
- 56°33′09″N 22°59′54″E
- Country: Latvia

Area
  - Total: 76.71 km^{2} (29.62 sq mi)
  - Land: 75.01 km^{2} (28.96 sq mi)
  - Water: 1.7 km^{2} (0.66 sq mi)

Population (1 January 2025)
  - Total: 356
  - Density: 4.75/km^{2} (12.3/sq mi)

Īle Parish (Latvian: Īles pagasts) is an administrative territorial entity of Dobele Municipality, Latvia.

== Towns, villages and settlements of Īle parish ==
There are three small settlements located in the Īle parish. These are Stirnas, Īle and Mūrīši. The largest of these three is Īle which is where the center of the parish is located.

Stirnas has grown around an 18th or 19th century manor, which is now long abandoned. In the last decades Stirnas population's been waning. Stirnas is located on the coast of Lielauce Ezers, and on the opposite coast the Lielauce Castle stands erected.
