= Amata (river) =

River in Latvia

Coordinates: 57°18′N 25°08′E

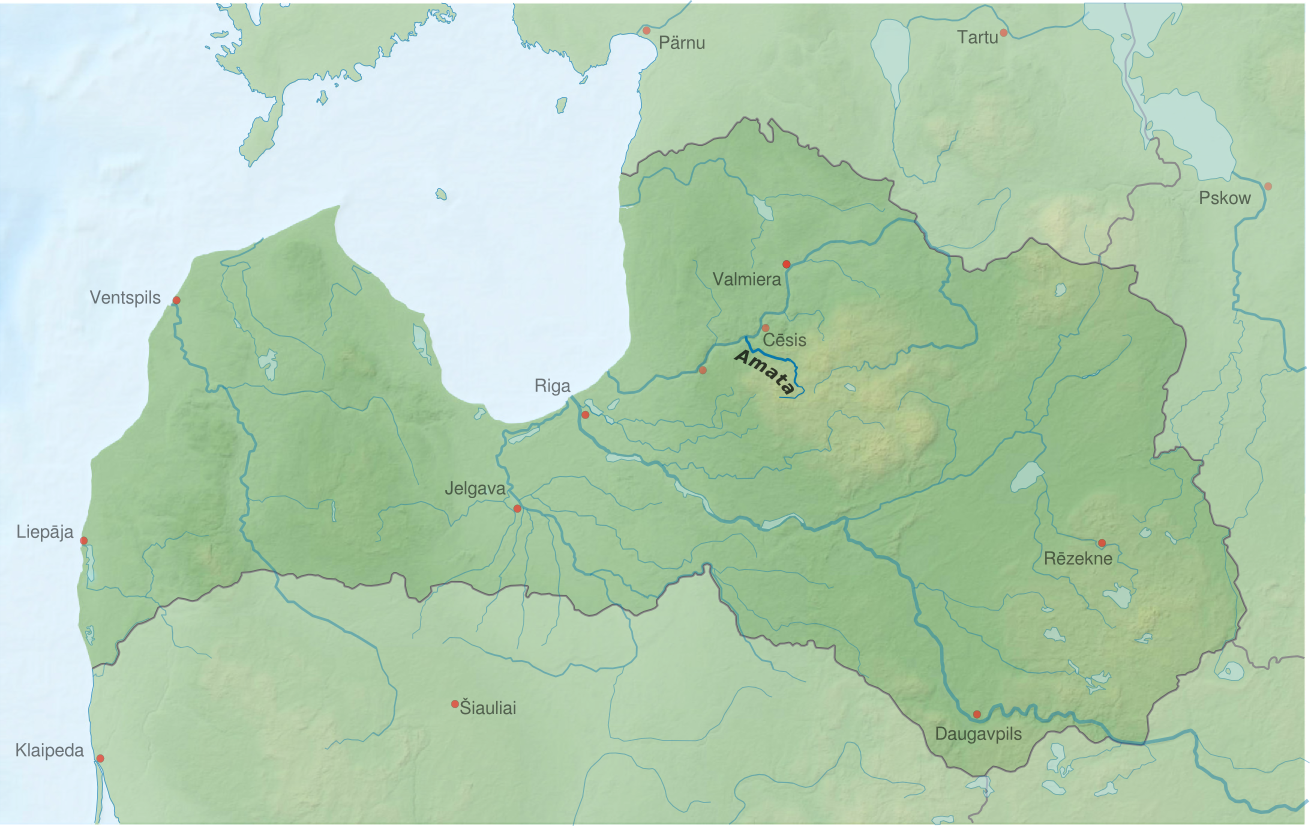

Location
- Country: Latvia

Physical characteristics
- Source
  - location: Lake Kukala, Latvia
  - elevation: 216 m (709 ft)
- Mouth
  - location: Gauja
- Length: 66 km (41 mi)
- Basin size: 386 km^{2} (149 sq mi)

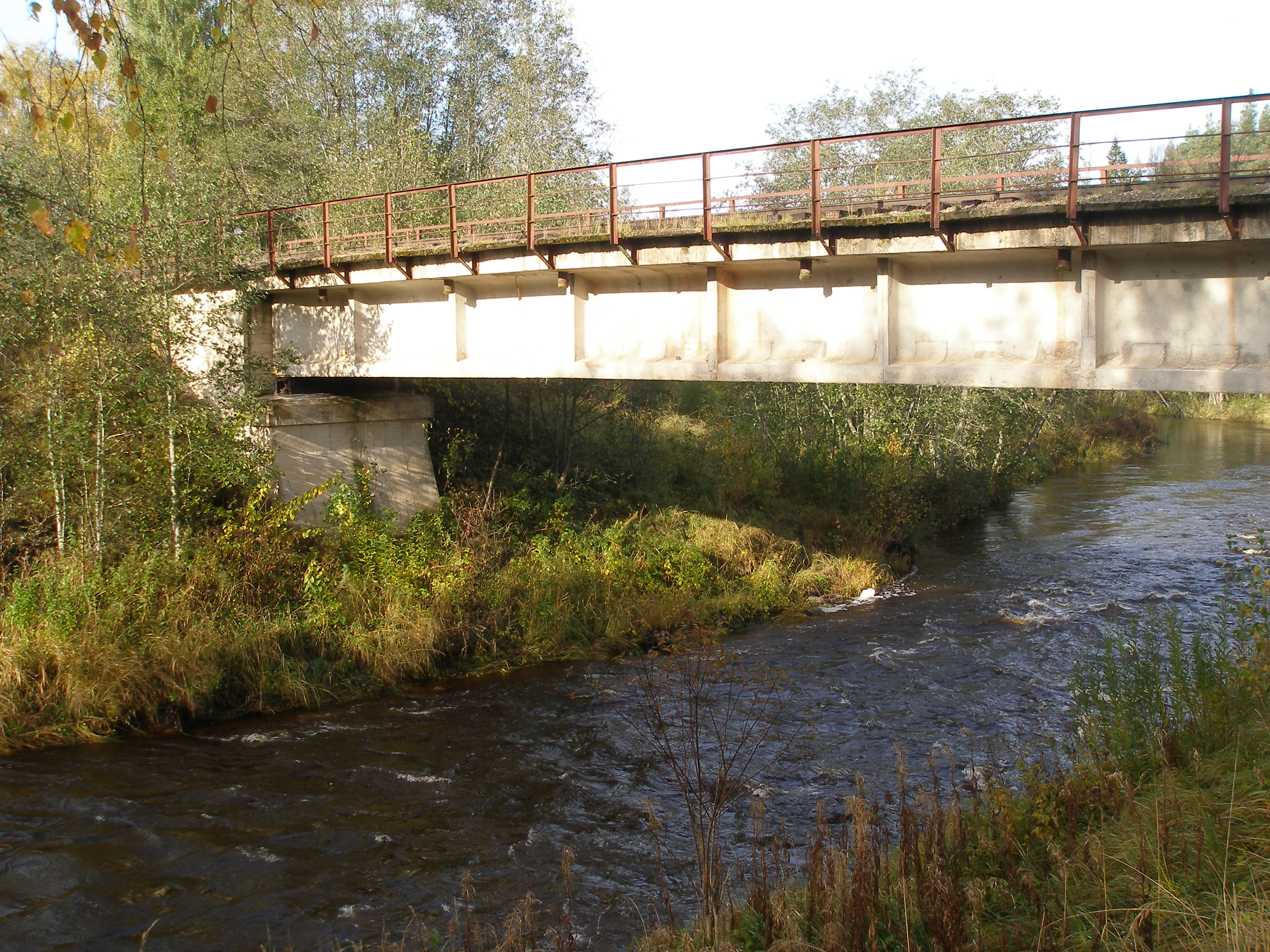
The Amata

The Amata is a river in Gauja National Park in the Middle Latvian Lowland. It flows 66 km (41 mi) from lake Kukala in Vidzeme to the river Gauja. The riverbanks feature Devonian red sandstone cliffs, and rapids. The River Amata is one of Latvia's fastest rivers and has one of the deepest valleys of the rivers in Vidzeme, with up to 45 m (148 ft) high sandstone and dolomite bedrock banks.

One of the steepest bank of Amata is the Zvārtes rock. It is more than 350 million years old and its height measures 20 m (66 ft). It is one of the most popular sandstone outcrops in Latvia.
