= Jaunbērze Parish =

Parish of Latvia

- parish of Latvia
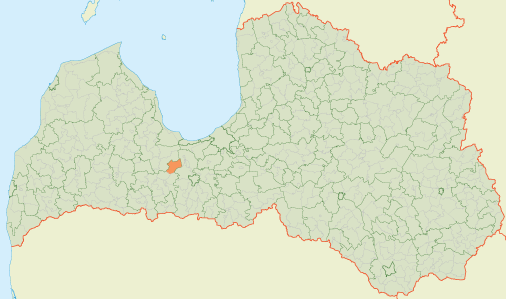
- Coordinates: 56°45′22″N 23°24′43″E
- Country: Latvia

Population (1 January 2026)
  - Total: 802
- Time zone: Eastern European Time

Jaunbērze Parish (Latvian: Jaunbērzes pagasts) is an administrative unit of Dobele Municipality in the Semigallia region of Latvia.

== Towns, villages and settlements of Jaunbērze Parish ==
- Jaunbērze
- Mežinieki
- Apšupe
- Sīpele
- Kazupe
