= Drusti Parish =

Parish of Latvia

- parish of Latvia
- Coat of arms

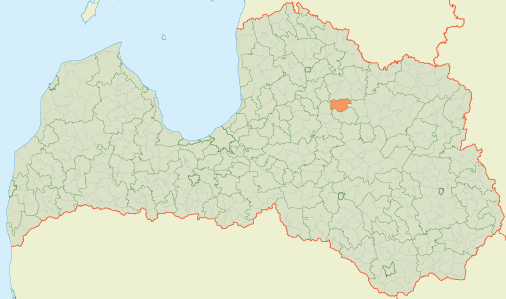
- 57°14′36″N 25°53′33″E
- Country: Latvia

Area
  - Total: 156.63 km^{2} (60.48 sq mi)
  - Land: 150.64 km^{2} (58.16 sq mi)
  - Water: 5.99 km^{2} (2.31 sq mi)

Population (1 January 2026)
  - Total: 696
  - Density: 4.62/km^{2} (12.0/sq mi)

Drusti Parish (Latvian: Drustu pagasts) is an administrative unit of Smiltene Municipality, Latvia. Prior to the 2009 administrative reforms it was part of Cēsis district.

== Towns, villages and settlements of Drusti parish ==
- Drusti
