= Naudīte Parish =

Parish of Latvia

- parish of Latvia
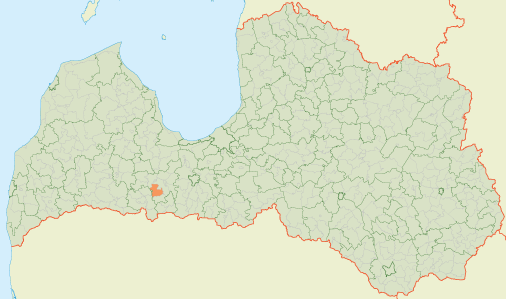
- Coordinates: 56°33′23″N 23°09′18″E
- Country: Latvia

Population (1 January 2026)
  - Total: 634

Naudīte Parish (Latvian: Naudītes pagasts) is an administrative unit of Dobele Municipality in the Semigallia region of Latvia.

== Towns, villages and settlements of Naudīte Parish ==
- Naudīte
- Apgulde
- Līdumi
