= Zosēni Parish =

Parish of Latvia

- parish of Latvia
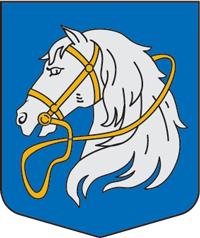
- Coat of arms

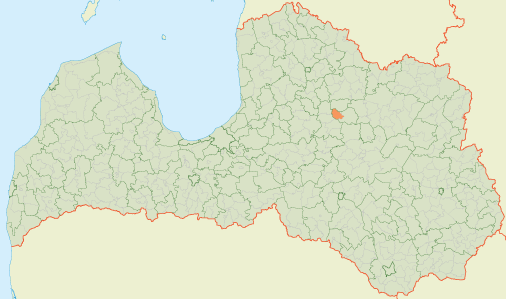
- 57°09′50″N 25°50′27″E
- Country: Latvia

Area
  - Total: 67.39 km^{2} (26.02 sq mi)
  - Land: 65.26 km^{2} (25.20 sq mi)
  - Water: 2.13 km^{2} (0.82 sq mi)

Population (1 January 2024)
  - Total: 292
  - Density: 4.3/km^{2} (11/sq mi)

Zosēni Parish (Latvian: Zosēnu pagasts) is an administrative unit of Cēsis Municipality in the Vidzeme region of Latvia (Prior to the 2009 it was part of the former Cēsis district).

== Towns, villages and settlements of Zosēni parish ==
- Melnbārži - parish administrative center
