= Līgatne Parish =

Parish of Latvia

- parish of Latvia
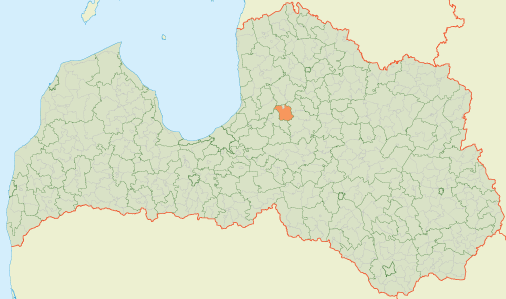
- 57°11′13″N 25°03′39″E
- Country: Latvia

Area
  - Total: 157.40 km^{2} (60.77 sq mi)
  - Land: 157.4 km^{2} (60.8 sq mi)
  - Water: 3.11 km^{2} (1.20 sq mi)

Population (1 January 2025)
  - Total: 2,179
  - Density: 13.84/km^{2} (35.86/sq mi)

Līgatne Parish (Latvian: Līgatnes pagasts, Paltmale Parish (Paltmales pagasts) until 1925) is an administrative territorial entity (parish) of Cēsis Municipality in the Vidzeme region of Latvia. The administrative center is the village of Augšlīgatne. The population in 2025 was 2,179. It covered an area of 160.6 km^{2}.

== History ==
In 1815, Riga merchants Konrāds Strohs and Kārlis Kībers acquired vast territories in the valley of the lower reaches of the Līgatne River, which they named Konrādsrūe (Conradsruhe). They also acquired the Paltmale Manor mill, converting it into a paper manufacturing facility. This manufactory produced the first 1050 poods (approximately 17 tons) of Līgatne paper from rags. Products included writing paper, various types of wrapping paper, and letter paper. These were the beginnings of the Līgatne Paper Mill.

In 1890, Henrijs Visendorfs, the son of a local miller, purchased the Paltmale Mill for his parents. He expanded it, transforming it into a modern enterprise with a cement plant and a cotton processing unit that produced the best cotton wool in the Russian Empire from Egyptian cotton. He also installed a hydro turbine with an electric generator at a time when electricity was still unknown in Riga. Visendorff also participated in laying the foundation stone of the Paltmale Social Society's building, donating a significant sum to the project.

In 1913, the Ķempji Parish was separated from Paltmale Parish. Both parishes were subidivisions of Riga county. Līgatne Parish (called Paltmale Parish until 1925) developed on the former Paltmale Manor lands. In 1933, Ķempji Parish was rejoined with Līgatne Parish. By 1935, Līgatne Parish covered an area of 72.4 km².

In 1945, the Līgatne and Ķempji Soviet village councils were established in the parish, but the parish itself was dissolved in 1949 and included in Sigulda district. That same year, the worker's settlement status was granted to the Līgatne Paper Mill settlement, which was separated into an independent administrative territory. In 1951, part of the Lakši village was added to Līgatne village, followed by Ķempji village in 1954 and part of Sigulda village in 1958. When Sigulda district was dissolved in 1962/1963, Līgatne was transferred to Cēsis district. In 1990, the village was reorganized into a parish.

In 2009, Līgatne Parish of Cēsis district was merged with the town of Līgatne to form Līgatne Municipality. In 2021, Līgatne Municipality was incorporated into Cēsis Municipality.
