= Nīkrāce Parish =

Parish of Latvia

- parish of Latvia
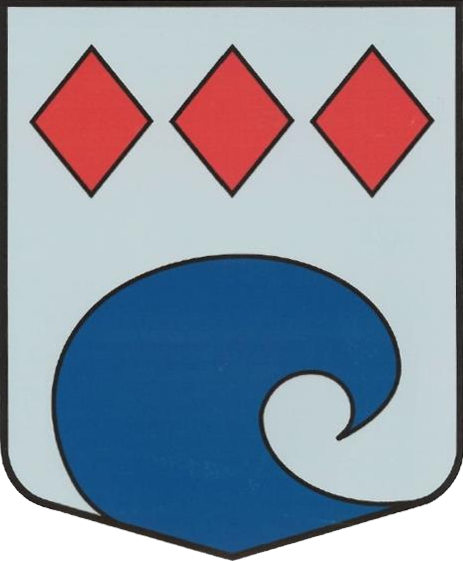
- Coat of arms

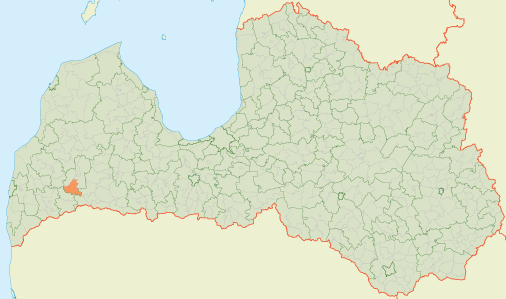
- 56°33′40″N 21°55′47″E

- Location within Latvia
- Country: Latvia

Area
  - Total: 133.88 km^{2} (51.69 sq mi)
  - Land: 129.5 km^{2} (50.0 sq mi)
  - Water: 4.38 km^{2} (1.69 sq mi)

Population (1 January 2026)
  - Total: 499
  - Density: 3.85/km^{2} (9.98/sq mi)

Nīkrāce Parish (Latvian: Nīkrāces pagasts) is an administrative unit of Kuldīga Municipality in the Courland region of Latvia. The parish has a population of 710 (as of 1/07/2010) and covers an area of 130.51 km^{2}.

== Villages of Nīkrāce parish ==
- Dzelda
- Lēnas
- Maznīkrāce
- Nīkrāce
- Vormsāte
