= Vīpe Parish =

Parish of Latvia

- parish of Latvia
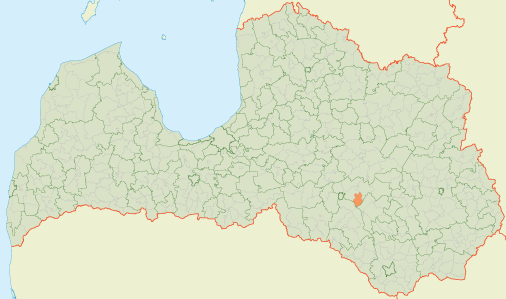
- Coordinates: 56°28′11″N 26°07′03″E
- Country: Latvia

Population (1 January 2026)
  - Total: 512

Vīpe Parish (Latvian: Vīpes pagasts) is an administrative unit of Jēkabpils Municipality in the Latgale region of Latvia.

== Towns, villages and settlements of Vīpe parish ==
- Vīpe – parish administrative center
