= Lielauce Parish =

Parish of Latvia

- parish of Latvia
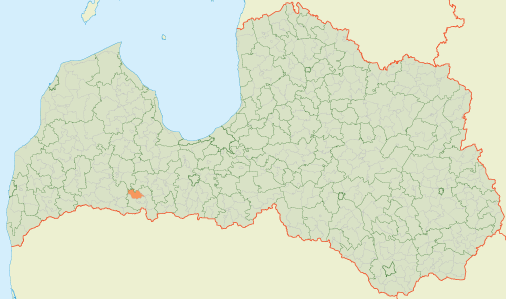
- 56°31′32″N 22°50′55″E

- Location within Latvia
- Country: Latvia

Area
  - Total: 79.37 km^{2} (30.64 sq mi)
  - Land: 73.85 km^{2} (28.51 sq mi)
  - Water: 5.52 km^{2} (2.13 sq mi)

Population (1 January 2026)
  - Total: 351
  - Density: 4.75/km^{2} (12.3/sq mi)

Lielauce Parish (Latvian: Lielauces pagasts) is an administrative unit of Dobele Municipality, Latvia. Before the 2021 administrative reforms it was part of Auce Municipality.

== Towns, villages and settlements of Lielauce parish ==
- Lielauce
- Ķieģeļceplis
- Ražotāji
