= Varieši Parish =

Parish of Latvia

- parish of Latvia
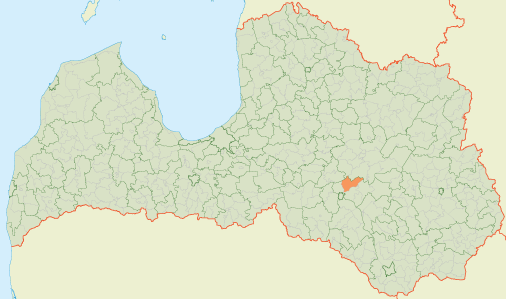
- Coordinates: 56°36′08″N 26°00′49″E
- Country: Latvia

Population (1 January 2026)
  - Total: 964

Varieši Parish (Latvian: Variešu pagasts) is an administrative unit of Jēkabpils Municipality in the Latgale region of Latvia.

== Towns, villages and settlements of Varieši parish ==
- Varieši – parish administrative center
