= Bēne Parish =

Parish of Latvia

- parish of Latvia
- Flag Coat of arms

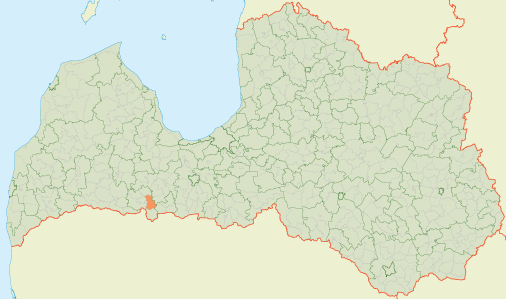
- Coordinates: 56°27′30″N 23°04′11″E
- Country: Latvia

Area
  - Total: 88.92 km^{2} (34.33 sq mi)

Population (1 January 2026)
  - Total: 1,312

Bēne Parish (Latvian: Bēnes pagasts) is an administrative territorial entity of Dobele Municipality in the Semigallia region of Latvia.
