= Vītiņi Parish =

Parish of Latvia

- parish of Latvia
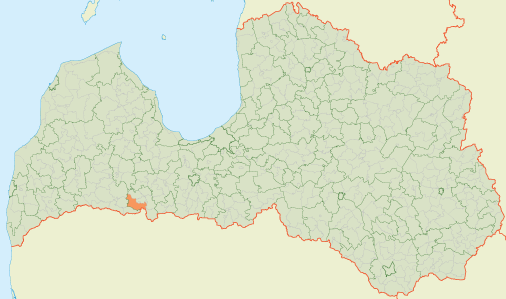
- 56°26′57″N 22°51′02″E
- Country: Latvia

Area
  - Total: 131.17 km^{2} (50.65 sq mi)
  - Land: 131.17 km^{2} (50.65 sq mi)
  - Water: 2.57 km^{2} (0.99 sq mi)

Population (1 January 2025)
  - Total: 757
  - Density: 5.77/km^{2} (14.9/sq mi)

Vītiņi Parish (Latvian: Vītiņu pagasts) is an administrative unit of Dobele Municipality, Latvia.
