= Krimūna Parish =

Parish of Latvia

- parish of Latvia
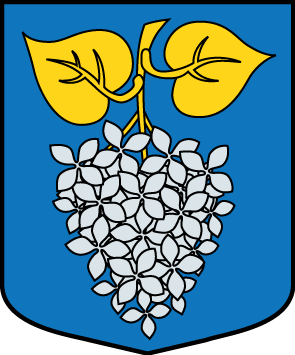
- Coat of arms

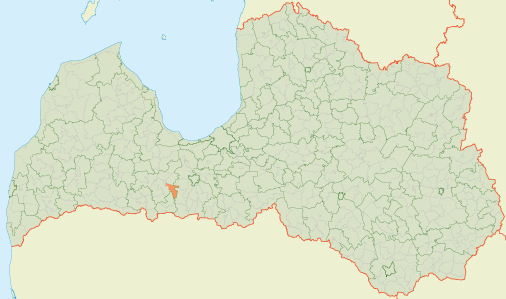
- 56°33′58″N 23°23′54″E
- Country: Latvia

Area
  - Total: 70.84 km^{2} (27.35 sq mi)
  - Land: 69.78 km^{2} (26.94 sq mi)
  - Water: 1.06 km^{2} (0.41 sq mi)

Population (1 January 2025)
  - Total: 1,009
  - Density: 14.46/km^{2} (37.45/sq mi)

Krimūna Parish (Latvian: Krimūnu pagasts) is an administrative unit of Dobele Municipality in the Semigallia region of Latvia.

== Towns, villages and settlements of Krimūna Parish ==
- Krimūnas
- Akācijas
- Ceriņi
- Lauciņi
- Parūķis
- Degumuiža
