= Dunika Parish =

Parish of Latvia

- parish of Latvia
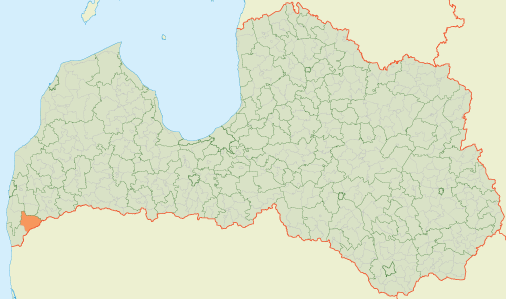
- 56°16′47″N 21°18′57″E
- Country: Latvia

Area
  - Total: 210.39 km^{2} (81.23 sq mi)
  - Land: 207.84 km^{2} (80.25 sq mi)
  - Water: 2.55 km^{2} (0.98 sq mi)

Population (1 January 2024)
  - Total: 534
  - Density: 2.5/km^{2} (6.6/sq mi)

Dunika Parish (Latvian: Dunikas pagasts) is an administrative unit of South Kurzeme Municipality, Latvia.

== Villages of Dunika Parish ==
- Bites
- Dunika
- Jēči
- Lankuti
- Langeris
- Lukne
- Sedviņi
- Sikšņi
- Slamsti
- Sudargi
- Šuķene
