= Ukri Parish =

Parish of Latvia

- parish of Latvia
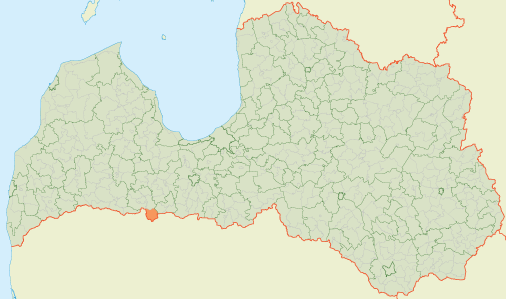
- Coordinates: 56°21′51″N 23°05′42″E
- Country: Latvia

Population (1 January 2026)
  - Total: 257

Ukri parish (Latvian: Ukru pagasts) is an administrative unit of Dobele Municipality, Latvia. It has a area of 94.5 km²

== Demographics ==
Ukri Parish has a population density of 2.61 people/km² as of 2024.

Historical Population of Ukri Parish per year.
Year	2017	2020	2021	2022	2023	2024	2026
Population	309	275	287	284	264	247	257
