= Mežāre Parish =

Parish in Jēkabpils Municipality, Latvia

- parish of Latvia
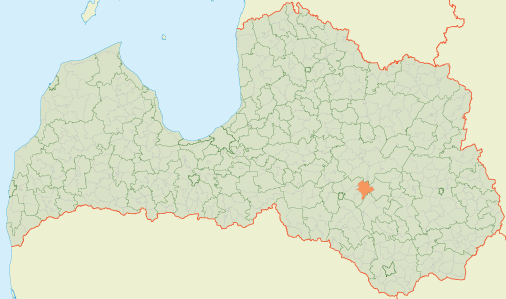
- Coordinates: 56°33′19″N 26°13′16″E
- Country: Latvia

Population (1 January 2026)
  - Total: 558
- Time zone: Eastern European Time

Mežāre Parish (Latvian: Mežāres pagasts) is an administrative unit of Jēkabpils Municipality in the Latgale region of Latvia.

== Villages and settlements of Mežāre Parish ==
- Mežāre – parish administrative center
