= Atašiene Parish =

Parish in Jēkabpils Municipality, Latvia

- parish of Latvia
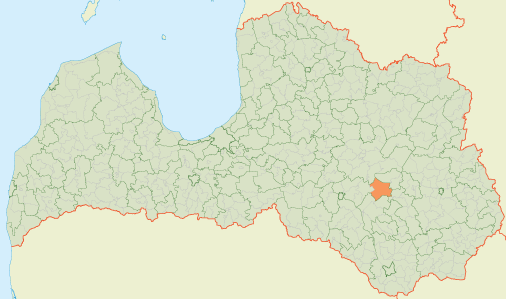
- 56°32′44″N 26°27′10″E
- Country: Latvia

Area
  - Total: 243.02 km^{2} (93.83 sq mi)
  - Land: 238.39 km^{2} (92.04 sq mi)
  - Water: 4.63 km^{2} (1.79 sq mi)

Population (1 January 2025)
  - Total: 516
  - Density: 2.16/km^{2} (5.61/sq mi)

Atašiene Parish (Latvian: Atašienes pagasts, Latgalian: Atašinis pogosts) is an administrative unit of Jēkabpils Municipality in the Latgale region of Latvia. The administrative center is the village of Atašiene.
