= Skrunda Parish =

Parish of Latvia

- parish of Latvia
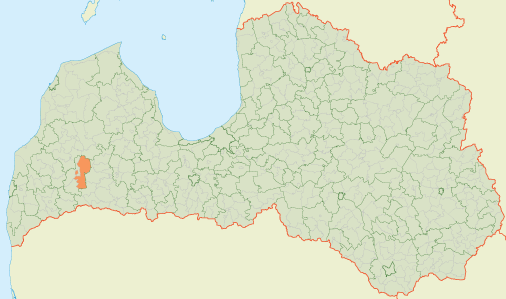
- 56°41′51″N 22°04′18″E

- Location within Latvia
- Country: Latvia

Area
  - Total: 261.18 km^{2} (100.84 sq mi)
  - Land: 248.31 km^{2} (95.87 sq mi)
  - Water: 12.87 km^{2} (4.97 sq mi)

Population (1 January 2026)
  - Total: 895
  - Density: 3.60/km^{2} (9.34/sq mi)

Skrunda Parish (Latvian: Skrundas pagasts) is an administrative unit of Kuldīga Municipality in the Courland region of Latvia. The parish has a population of 1209 (as of 1/07/2010) and covers an area of 257.91 km^{2} (99.58 sq mi).

== Villages of Skrunda parish ==
- Bračas
- Ciecere
- Jaunmuiža
- Kušaiņi
- Niedre
- Plostnieki
- Pumpuri
- Rūnaiši
- Savenieki
- Vēršmuiža
- Videnieki
