= Penkule Parish =

Parish of Latvia

- parish of Latvia
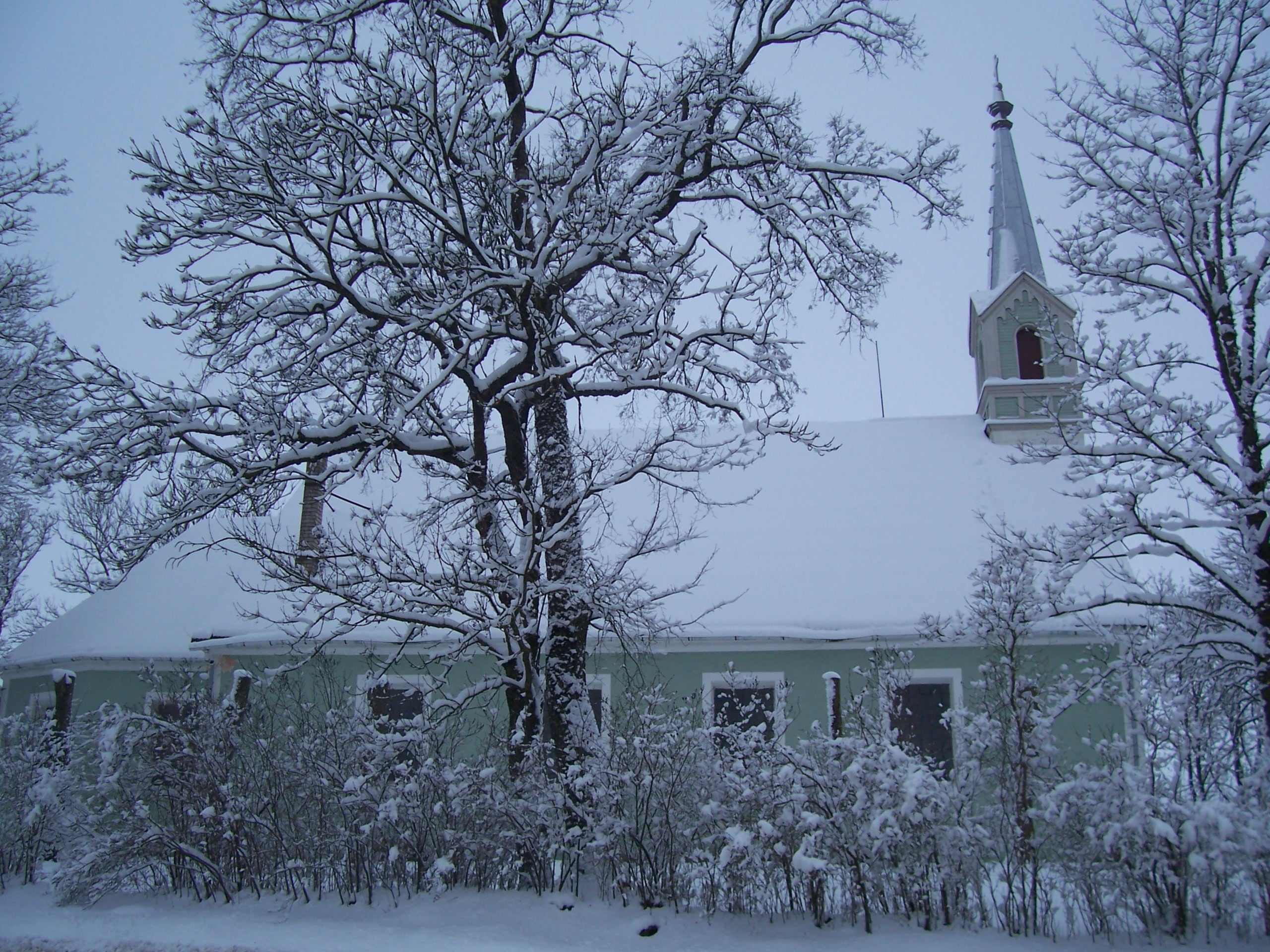

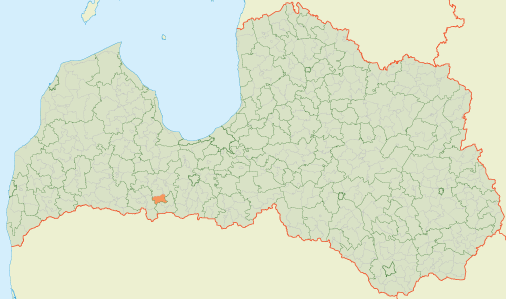
- Coordinates: 56°29′18″N 23°12′23″E
- Country: Latvia

Population (1 January 2026)
  - Total: 749
- Time zone: Eastern European Time

Penkule first mentioned as Wanpen in 1272 as part of the protocol of the division of the Spārnene district. The modern day village formed around the now non existent pankelhof manor. Penkule Parish (Latvian: Penkules pagasts) is an administrative unit of Dobele Municipality in the Semigallia region of Latvia.

== Towns, villages and settlements of Penkule Parish ==
- Penkule
- Baldonas
- Ezeriņi
- Skujaine
