= Preiļi Municipality =

Municipality of Latvia

Coordinates: 56°18′N 26°43′E

Preiļi Municipality Preiļu novads
- Municipality
- Flag Coat of arms

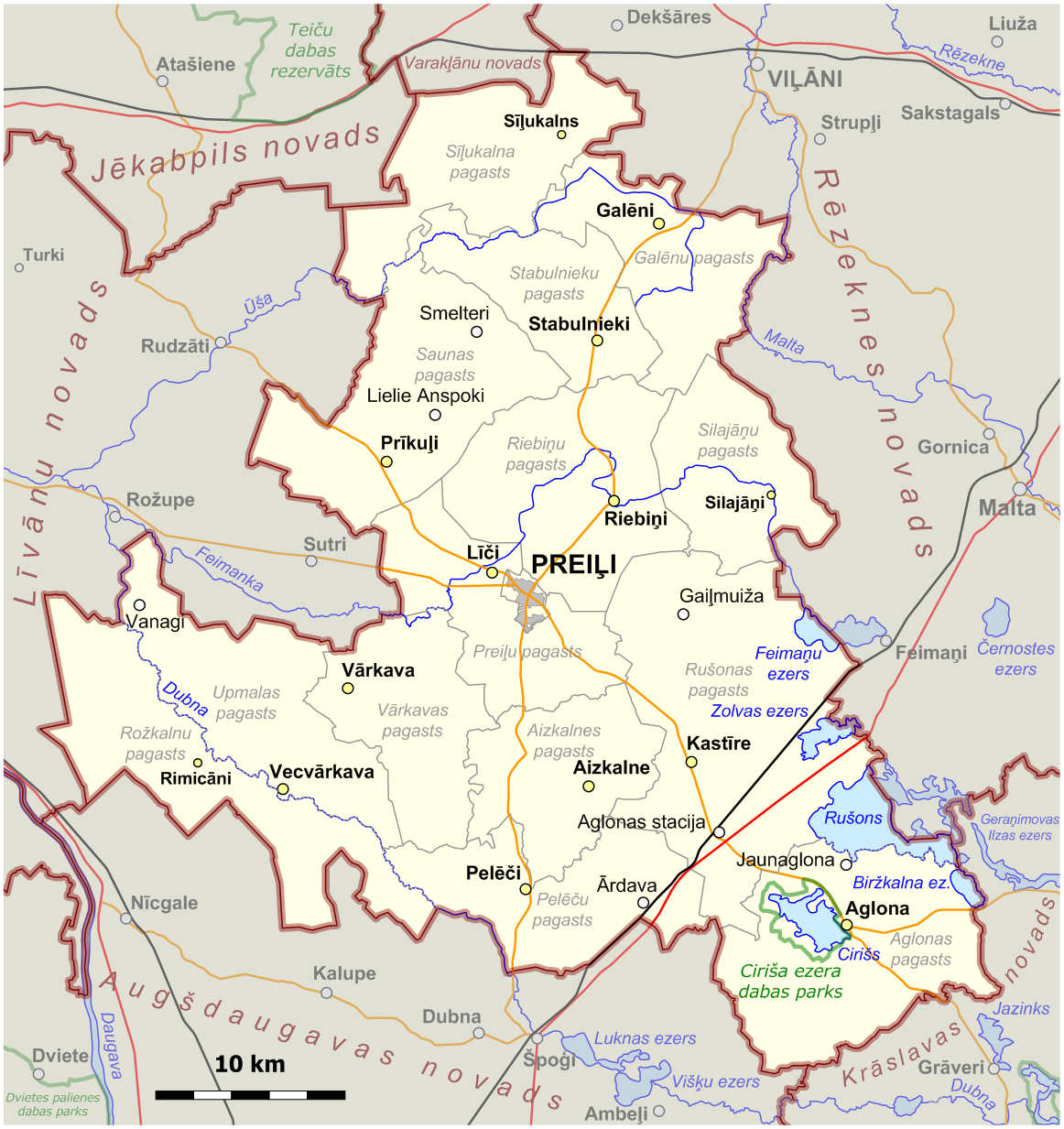
- Country: Latvia
- Formed: 2000
- Reformed: 2021
- Centre: Preiļi

Government
  - Council Chair: Aldis Adamovičs (LP/JV/LA)

Area
  - Total: 1,413.44 km^{2} (545.73 sq mi)
  - Land: 1,336.74 km^{2} (516.12 sq mi)

Population (2026)
  - Total: 15,238
  - Density: 11.399/km^{2} (29.524/sq mi)
- Website: www.preili.lv

Preiļi Municipality (Latvian: Preiļu novads) is a municipality in Latgale, Latvia. The administrative center is Preiļi. The municipality was formed in 2000 by merging Aizkalne Parish, Preiļi Parish and Preiļi town of Preiļi district. In 2009 it absorbed Pelēči Parish and Sauna Parish after the abolition of districts. The population in 2020 was 9,054.

On 1 July 2021, Preiļi Municipality was enlarged when Riebiņi Municipality, Vārkava Municipality and Aglona Parish were merged into it.

== Twin towns — sister cities ==
Preiļi is twinned with:

- Nizhyn, Ukraine
- Ocnița, Moldova
- Sahil, Azerbaijan
- Utena, Lithuania

== Notable people ==
- Alexander Kovalevsky (1840 in Vārkava Parish – 1901), a Russian embryologist
- Vladimir Kovalevsky (1842 in Vārkava Parish – 1883), a Russian paleontologist and academic
- Henry Dymsha (1856 in Kapinsky Parish – 1918), a Polish landowner and politician
- Polikarps Vilcāns (1894 in Silajāņi Parish – 1969), a Latvian and Latgalian ceramicist.
- Julijans Vaivods (1895 in Vārkava Parish – 1990), Catholic prelate, cardinal and a KGB collaborator
- Andrejs Paulāns (1896 in Šembeļi – 1973), a distinguished Latvian and Latgalian ceramicist.
- Polikarps Čerņavskis (1923 in Silajāņi Parish – 1997), was a Latgalian ceramicist.
- Janīna Kursīte-Pakule (born 1952 in Arendole Parish), literary scholar, linguist, writer and politician.
