= Dobele Municipality =

Municipality of Latvia

Coordinates: 56.6500°N 23.2333°E

Dobele Municipality Dobeles novads
- Municipality
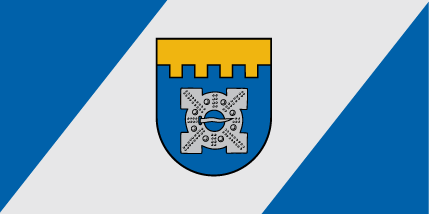
- Flag Coat of arms

- Country: Latvia
- Formed: 2009
- Reformed: 2021
- Centre: Dobele

Government
  - Council Chair: Andrejs Spridzāns (LZP)

Area
  - Total: 1,629.33 km^{2} (629.09 sq mi)
  - Land: 1,577.85 km^{2} (609.21 sq mi)

Population (2026)
  - Total: 27,100
  - Density: 17.2/km^{2} (44.5/sq mi)
- Website: www.dobele.lv

Dobele Municipality (Latvian: Dobeles novads) is a municipality in the historical region of Zemgale, and the Zemgale Planning Region in Latvia. The municipality was formed in 2009 by merging Dobele town and the Annenieki, Auri, Bērze, Biksti, Dobele, Jaunbērze, Krimūna, Naudīte, Penkule and Zebrene parishes, the administrative centre being Dobele. As of 2020, the population was 19,286.

On 1 July 2021, Dobele Municipality was enlarged when Auce Municipality and Tērvete Municipality were merged into it. It borders Lithuania.

== Twin towns — sister cities ==
Dobele is twinned with:

- Akmenė, Lithuania
- Ängelholm, Sweden
- Joniškis, Lithuania
- Konin, Poland
- Schmölln, Germany

== Notable people ==
- Georg Mancelius (1593 in Augstkalne Parish - 1654), a Baltic German Lutheran theologian
- Johann Albrecht Korff (1697 in Zebrene – 1766), Russian diplomat, president of St. Petersburg Academy of Sciences, 1734–1740.
- Kristaps Helmanis (1848 in Tērvete – 1892), a Latvian vaccinologist and microbiologist.
- Anna Brigadere (1861 in Tērvete – 1933), a writer, playwright and poet
- Lizete Iesmiņa-Mihelsone (1872 in Lielbērze – 1934), actress and opera singer.
- Kārlis Ulmanis (1877 in Bērze – 1942), politician, first Prime Minister of Latvia, 1918-1921 and also three more times
- Alberts Kviesis (1881 in Tērvete – 1944), politician, third President of Latvia, from 1930 to 1936.
- Alfrēds Birznieks (1889 – 1942), politician and lawyer, the Minister of the Interior, 1923 to 1924
- Gustavs Vanags (1891 in Ukri Parish — 1965), organic chemist and full member of Latvian Academy of Sciences
- Rūdolfs Gaitars (1907 in Penkule Parish – 1945), was a Waffen-Obersturmführer in the Waffen SS during WW II.
- Biruta Baumane (1922 in Tērvete Parish – 2017), a figurative painter, she developed the "harsh style" as a variety of Socialist realism
- Jānis Vagris (1930 in Naudīte Parish – 2023), a Latvian politician, served 1985 - 1988 and 1988 - 1990.

=== Sport ===
- Kārlis Bētiņš (1867 in Bērze Parish – 1943), a Latvian chess master
- Artūrs Plēsnieks (born 1992 in Tērvete Parish), weightlifter, bronze medallist at the 2020 Summer Olympics

== See also ==
- Administrative divisions of Latvia
