= Koknese Parish =

Parish in Aizkraukle Municipality, Latvia

Koknese Parish Kokneses pagasts
- Parish of Latvia
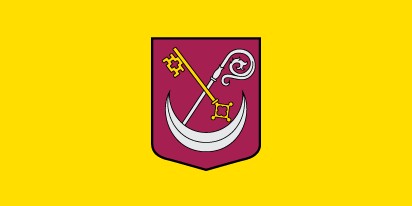
- Flag Coat of arms

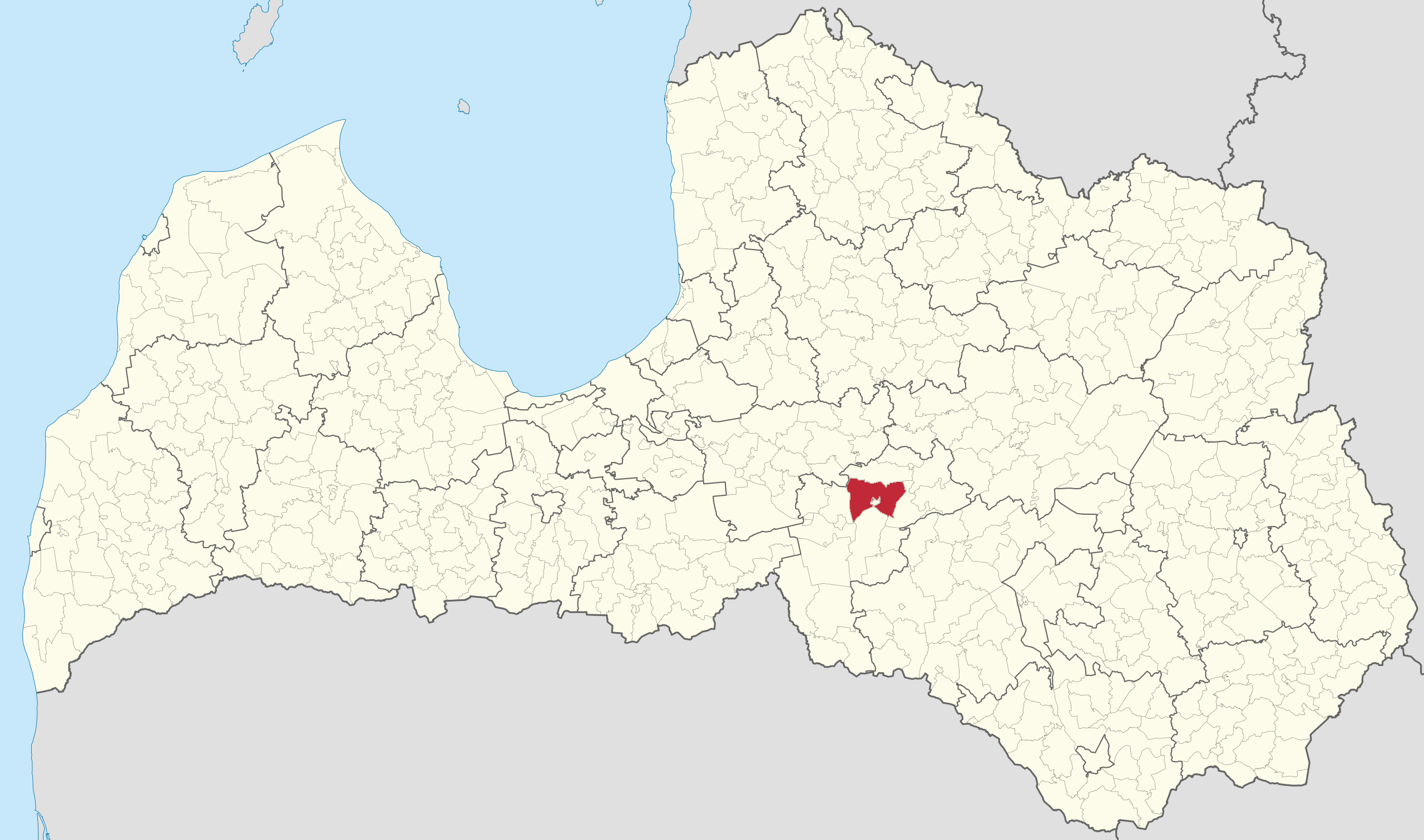
- Country: Latvia
- Municipality: Aizkraukle
- Established: 1866
- Reformed: 1990
- Seat: Koknese (extra-territorially)

Area
  - Total: 166.34 km^{2} (64.22 sq mi)
  - Land: 156.35 km^{2} (60.37 sq mi)
  - Water: 9.99 km^{2} (3.86 sq mi)

Population (2024)
  - Total: 1,003
  - Density: 6.415/km^{2} (16.62/sq mi)

Koknese Parish (Latvian: Kokneses pagasts) is an administrative unit of Aizkraukle Municipality in the Vidzeme region of Latvia. The parish center is Koknese, although as a town it is located outside the parish.

== History ==
Koknese Parish was founded after the dissolution of estate parishes due to the enactment of the Parish Local Government Act of 1866 of the Russian Empire.

Following the agrarian reform of 1920, the Koknese Manor with the semi-estates of Reiņi, Sofija, Mežs and Līdace was divided into 308 units in the total area of 3775.8 ha, the Koknese Teachers' Manor in 27 units, the Radalka Manor in 8 units, the Pastamuiža in 33 units, the Bilstiņi and Veidumuiža manors in 64 units, the Atradze Manor and Jeski semi-estates in 18 units. The summer colony of the staff of the University of Latvia was established at the centre of the Bilstiņi Manor. In 1935, the area of Koknese civil parish was 160.7 km^{2}.

During the Soviet occupation of Latvia, Bilstiņi, Koknese, Pērse and Ratnicēni village councils (or selsoviets) were formed in the parish in 1945. Parishes were dissolved by the Soviets in 1949. In 1954, Bilstiņi village was added to Koknese village. In 1958, Koknese was granted the status of a working settlement and annexed the village of Koknese as its rural territory. In 1962, a part of Ratnicēni village was added to the Koknese Rural Territory. In 1990, Koknese lost its status as an urban-type settlement and was reorganized as a parish of Aizkraukle district along with its rural territory.

In 2009, the Koknese Municipality was formed by merging Koknese Parish with Bebri Parish and Irši Parish. After the administrative territorial reform of 2021, Koknese was granted city status, separating it from the parish territory, while the parish and the town of Koknese were included in Aizkraukle Municipality.

== Villages and settlements of Koknese Parish ==
- Atradze
- Auliciems
- Bilstiņi
- Birznieki
- Bormaņi
- Kalnakrogs
- Kaplava
- Lipši
- Ratnicēni
- Reiņi
- Spriņģi
- Upeslīči
- Urgas
- Ūsiņi
- Viskāļi

== Notable people ==
- Pēteris Stučka - Latvian communist politician and revolutionary
