= Lielzalve Manor =

Manor house in Selonia, Latvia

- Selonia, Latvia
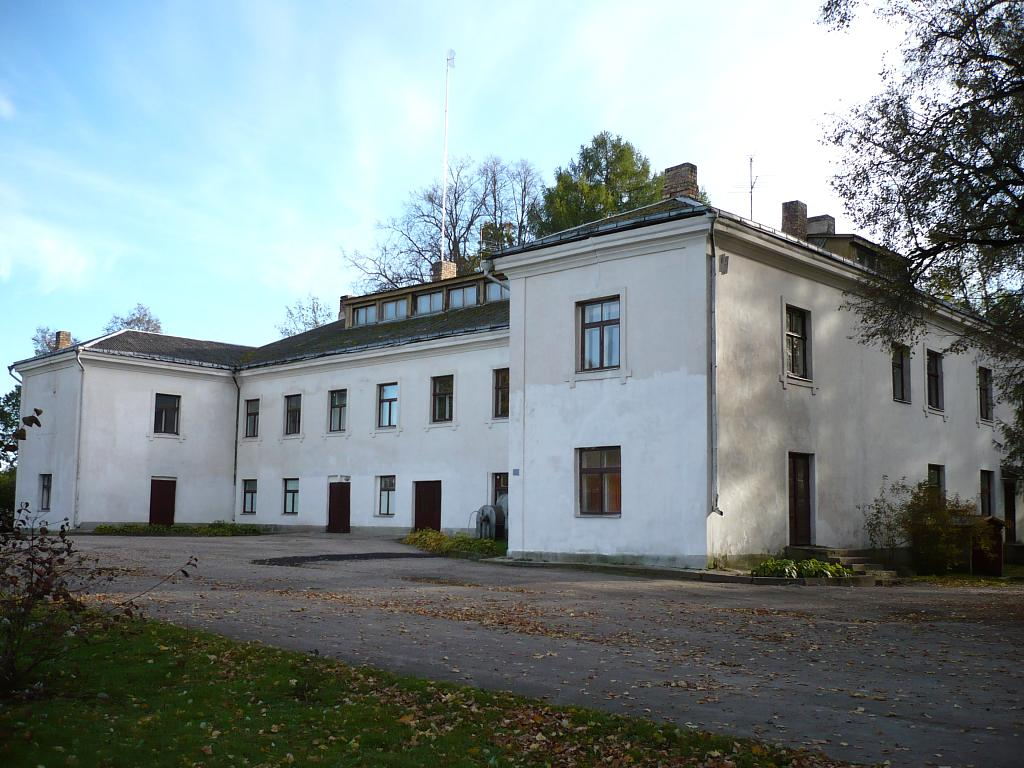

Site information
- Type: Manor

Location
- Coordinates: 56°19′34″N 25°14′51″E

Lielzalve Manor (German: Groß-Salwen) is a two-storey manor house built in the 19th century in Zalve Parish, Aizkraukle Municipality in the Selonia region of Latvia.

== History ==
After the collapse of the Livonian Order State, the land along the Zalvīte river was laid down by former Order Commander William von Effern, who in 1563 had married Duke Gotthard Kettler relatives. In 1607, in addition to Nereta Manor and Daudzese manor. Zalve Manor is mentioned as the third Efern Manor with Knau ( Knawen ) Half Manor.

After Wilhelm von Efern's death 1617. Zalve Manor was inherited by his wife. In 1688 her daughter inherited the manor and pledged it due to debts. During the Great Northern War plague outbreak epidemic of 1710, a large part of the population died in the area of Zalve. In 1744, Zalve Manor was sold to Krustpils and Skaistkalne s Nicholas Korf.

After the annexation of the Duchy of Courland and Semigallia and its incorporation into the Russian Empire, the manor became Platon Zubov (1767-1822), who in 1821 married Tekla Valentinovich. In 1826 the estate was acquired by Count Andrei Shuvalov ( Шувалов , 1802–1873) after his marriage to the widow of Zubov. 1845–1846. In 1820 he repaired the manor buildings, then rented the manor. In 1855, Zalve was inherited by his son Peter Shuvalov (1827-1889), who later became Governor-General of Livonia (1864-1866). Because the forests around Zalve were rich in beasts, the owners of the manor often conducted hunting with high guest attendance. His only son was Count Andrei Shuvalov (1865-1928), who reached the rank of Major General in the Russian Empire (1912), participated in Russian Civil War, emigrated to Switzerland in 1920. Already in 1900, a telephone was pulled into Zalve Manor to allow the Count to announce his arrival on the hunt.

After the agrarian reform of 1920, Lielzalve Manor was divided among young farmers, and in 1922 the school was moved to the former manor house. During the Second World War, the school housed a German Army military hospital. Lielzalve Manor was used as a school until 2009 when the school was closed. After that Manor stood empty around 10 years. In 2019 Manor building was rented to Non-governmental organisation Sēļu klubs (Selonian club).

== See also ==
- List of palaces and manor houses in Latvia
