= Sece Parish =

Parish of Latvia

- parish of Latvia
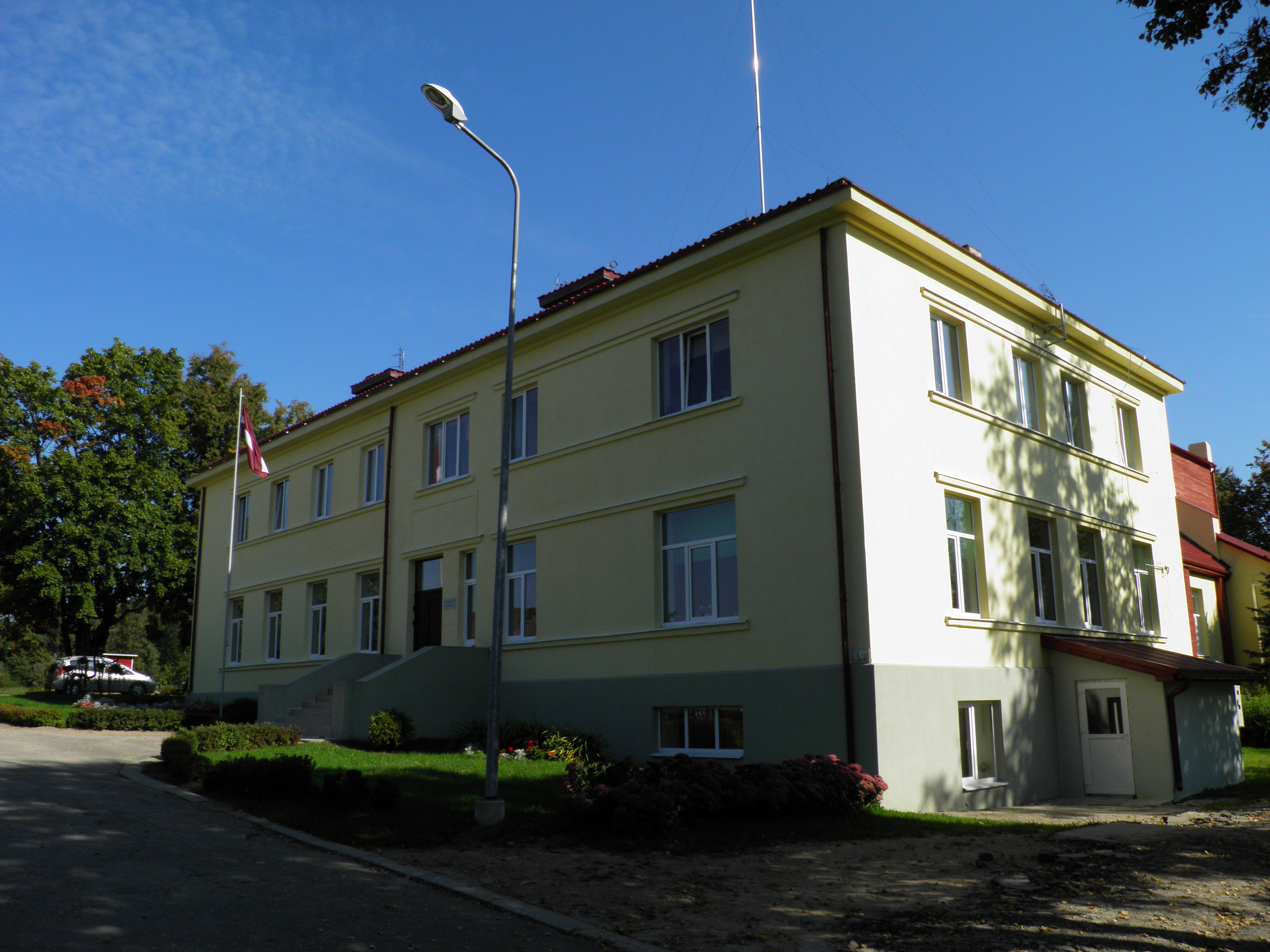

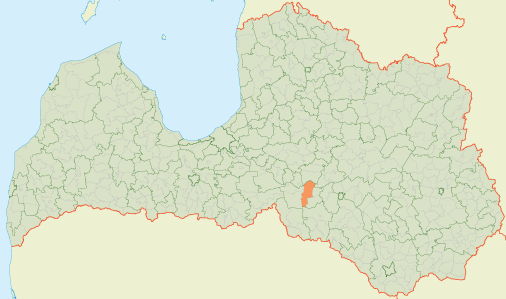
- 56°32′07″N 25°22′37″E
- Country: Latvia

Area
  - Total: 176.14 km^{2} (68.01 sq mi)
  - Land: 166.15 km^{2} (64.15 sq mi)
  - Water: 9.99 km^{2} (3.86 sq mi)

Population (1 January 2024)
  - Total: 859
  - Density: 4.9/km^{2} (13/sq mi)

Sece Parish (Latvian: Seces pagasts) is an administrative unit of Aizkraukle Municipality, Latvia. From 2009 until 2021 it was part of the former Jaunjelgava Municipality. Prior to the 2009 administrative reforms it was part of the Aizkraukle district. Latvian law defines Sece Parish as a part of the Selonia region.

== Towns, villages and settlements of Sece Parish ==
- Biķernieki
- Dalbes
- Kaļandri
- Kampāni
- Pinkas
- Purviņi
- Sece
- Škutāni
- Šļūkas
- Ziedāni
