= Skrīveri Municipality =

Former municipality of Latvia

Coordinates: 56°38′48″N 25°07′20″E

Skrīveri Municipality Skrīveru novads
- Municipality
- Coat of arms

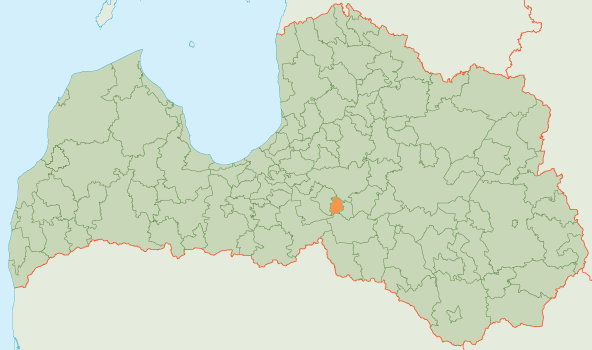
- Country: Latvia
- Formed: 2009
- Dissolved: 2021
- Centre: Skrīveri

Government
  - Council Chair (last): Andris Zālītis (We - For Skrīveri)

Area
  - Total: 105.46 km^{2} (40.72 sq mi)
  - Land: 102.74 km^{2} (39.67 sq mi)
  - Water: 2.72 km^{2} (1.05 sq mi)

Population (2021)
  - Total: 3,417
  - Density: 33.26/km^{2} (86.14/sq mi)
- Website: www.skriveri.lv

Skrīveri Municipality (Latvian: Skrīveru novads) is a former municipality in Vidzeme, Latvia. The municipality was created in 2009 by the reorganization of Skrīveri Parish of the Aizkraukle district.

The administrative centre was Skrīveri. The population in 2020 was 3,337.

On 1 July 2021, Skrīveri Municipality ceased to exist and its territory was merged into Aizkraukle Municipality as Skrīveri Parish.

== See also ==
- Administrative divisions of Latvia (2009)
