= Daudzese Parish =

Parish of Latvia

- parish of Latvia
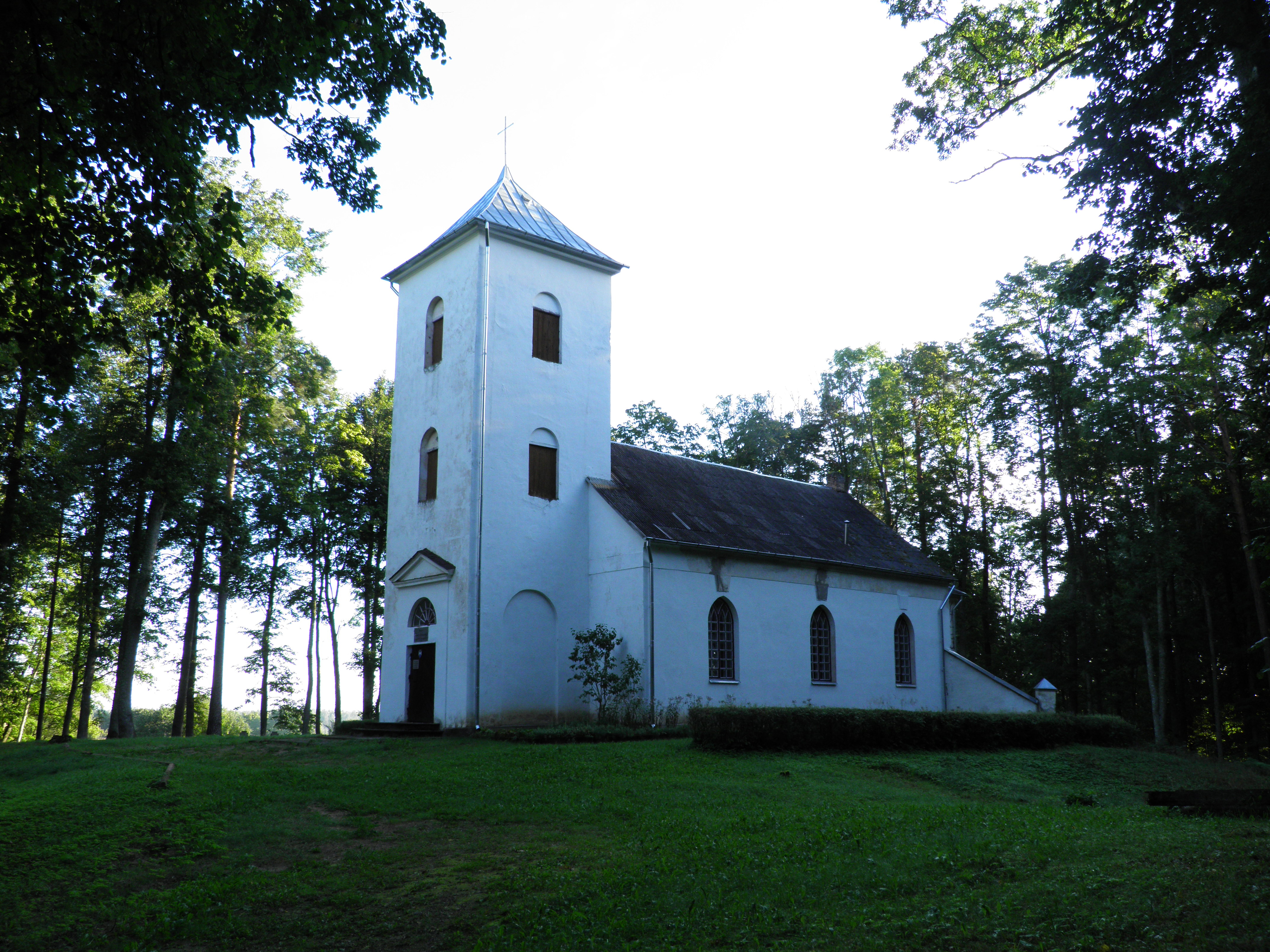

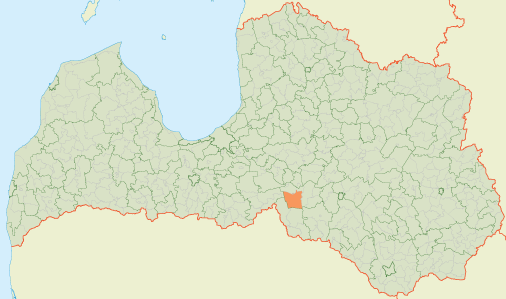
- 56°28′49″N 25°10′24″E
- Country: Latvia

Area
  - Total: 210.55 km^{2} (81.29 sq mi)
  - Land: 206.83 km^{2} (79.86 sq mi)
  - Water: 3.72 km^{2} (1.44 sq mi)

Population (1 January 2024)
  - Total: 902
  - Density: 4.3/km^{2} (11/sq mi)

Daudzese Parish (Latvian: Daudzeses pagasts) is an administrative unit of Aizkraukle Municipality, Latvia. From 2009 until 2021 it was part of the former Jaunjelgava Municipality (prior to the 2009 administrative-territorial reforms of Aizkraukle district). As of 2011 the population of Daudzese Parish stood at 1140 people. Latvian law defines Daudzese Parish as a part of the region of Selonia.

== Towns, villages and settlements of Daudzese Parish ==
- Daudzese
- Daudzeva
