= Koknese Municipality =

Municipality of Latvia

Coordinates: 56.6500°N 25.4333°E

Koknese Municipality Kokneses novads
- Municipality
- Flag Coat of arms

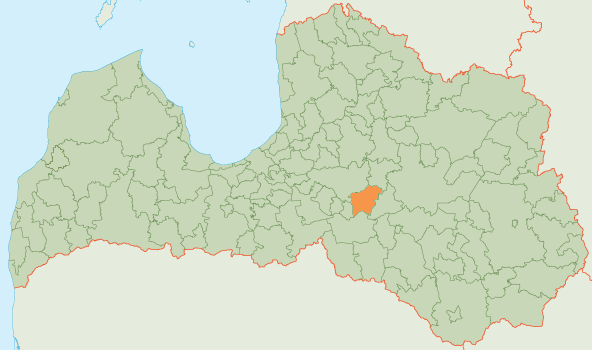
- Country: Latvia
- Formed: 2009
- Dissolved: 2021
- Centre: Koknese

Government
  - Chairman: Dainis Vingris (V, last)

Area
  - Total: 360.77 km^{2} (139.29 sq mi)
  - Land: 347.33 km^{2} (134.10 sq mi)
  - Water: 13.44 km^{2} (5.19 sq mi)

Population (2021)
  - Total: 4,851
  - Density: 13.97/km^{2} (36.17/sq mi)
- Website: www.koknese.lv

Koknese Municipality (Latvian: Kokneses novads) was a municipality in Vidzeme, Latvia. The municipality was formed on 1 July 2009 by merging Bebri parish, Irši Parish and Koknese Parish the administrative centre being Koknese.

On 1 July 2021, Koknese Municipality ceased to exist and its territory was merged into Aizkraukle Municipality as Koknese Parish.

== See also ==
- Administrative divisions of Latvia (2009)
