= Aizkraukle Municipality =

Municipality of Latvia

Coordinates: 56°36′15″N 25°15′14″E

Aizkraukle Municipality Aizkraukles novads
- Municipality
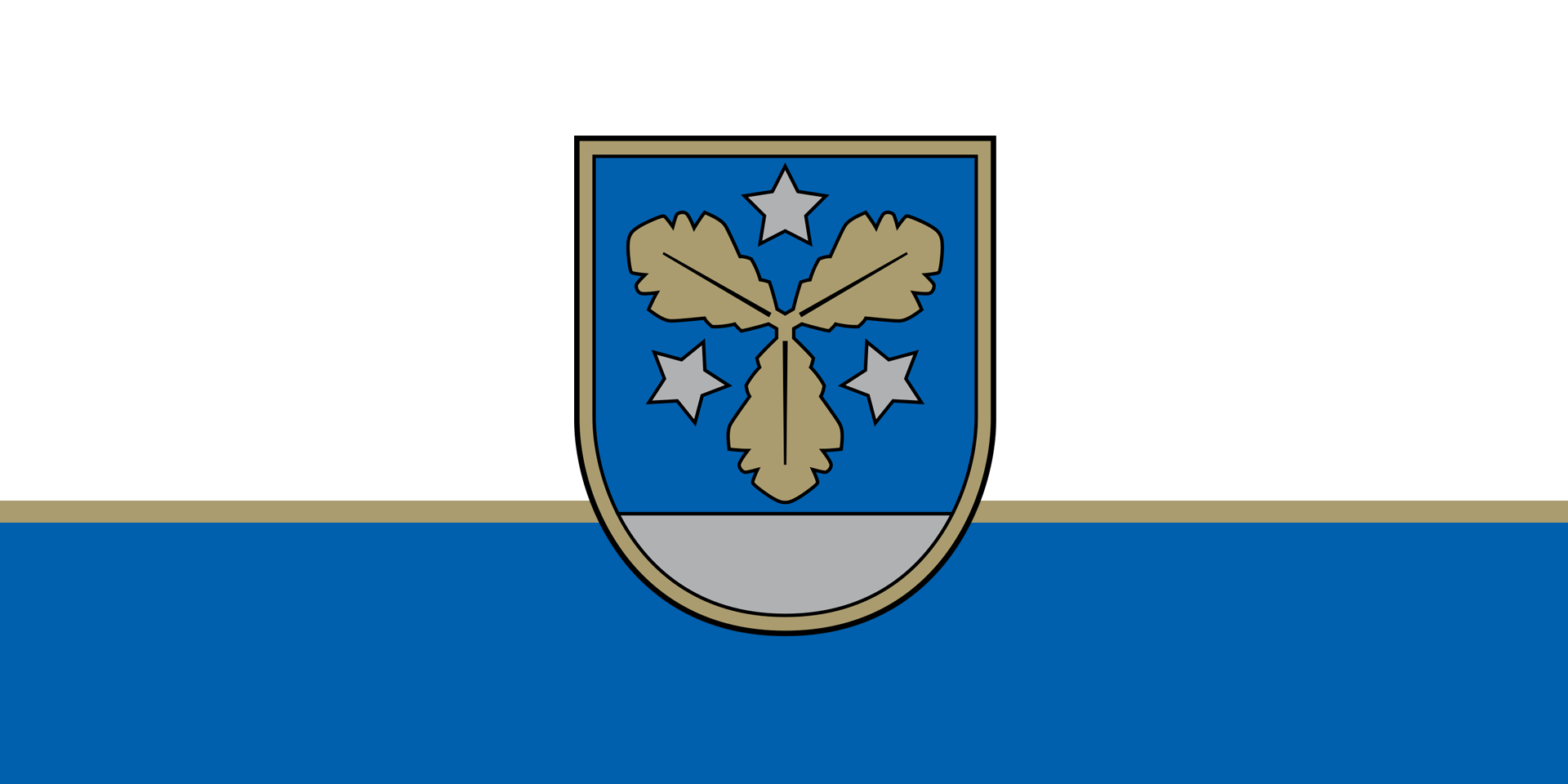
- Flag Coat of arms

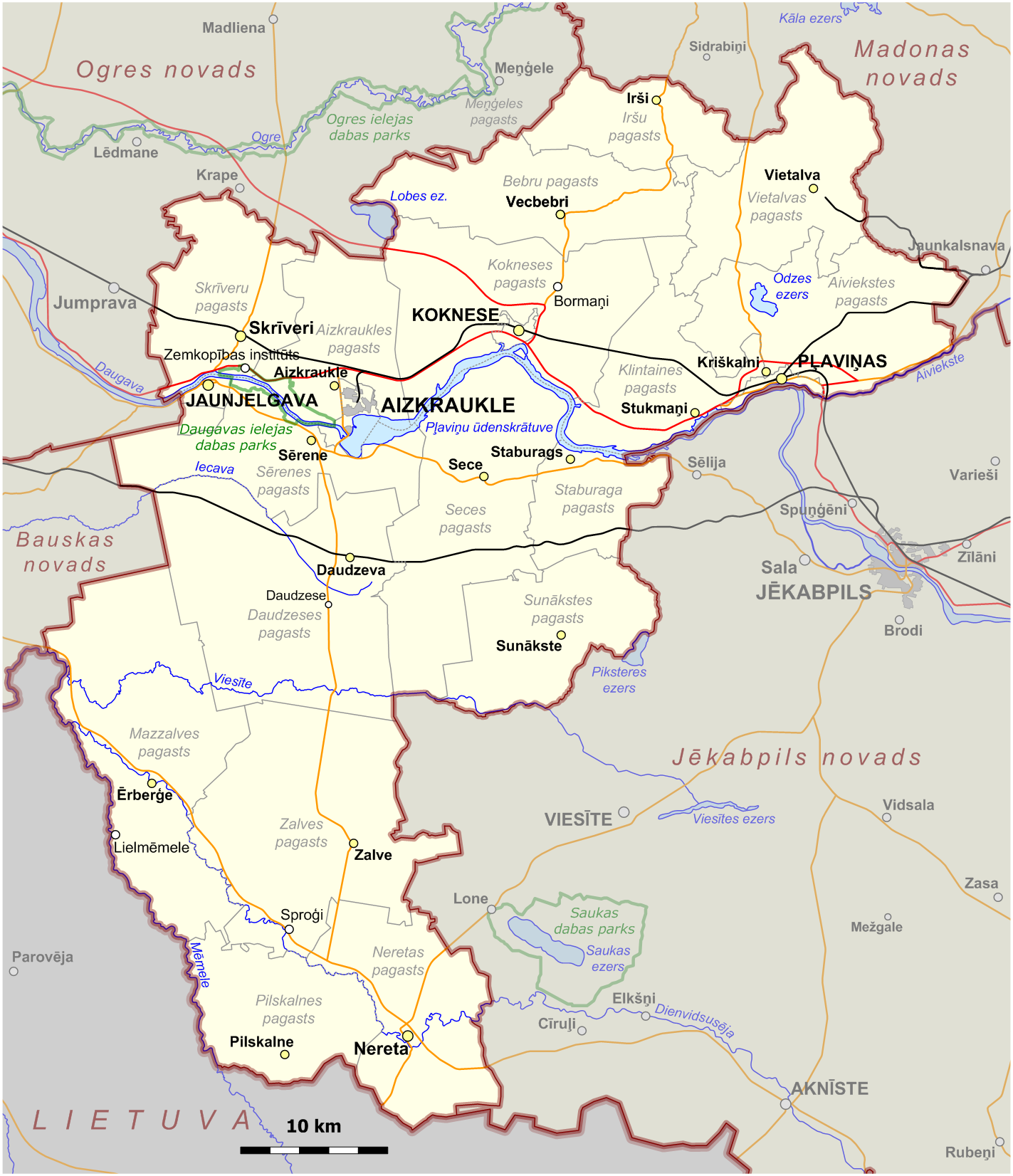
- Country: Latvia
- Formed: 2001
- Reformed: 2021
- Centre: Aizkraukle

Government
  - Council Chair: Leons Līdums (LA)

Area
  - Total: 2,274.26 km^{2} (878.10 sq mi)
  - Land: 2,174.50 km^{2} (839.58 sq mi)

Population (2026)
  - Total: 27,825
  - Density: 12.796/km^{2} (33.142/sq mi)
- Website: www.aizkraukle.lv

Aizkraukle Municipality (Latvian: Aizkraukles novads) is a municipality in Vidzeme, Latvia. Its center is the town of Aizkraukle. The municipality was first formed in 2001 by merging Aizkraukle and Aizkraukle Parish. The population in 2020 was 8,024.

As a part of the 2021 Latvian administrative reform, the municipalities of Aizkraukle, Jaunjelgava, Koknese, Nereta, Pļaviņas and Skrīveri were merged into a new Aizkraukle Municipality. The new municipality encompasses nearly all of the area of the former Aizkraukle district, with the omission of Kurmene Parish and Valle Parish. It borders Lithuania and is partially located both in Vidzeme and Selonia.

== Subdivisions ==
- Aiviekste Parish
- Aizkraukle Parish
- Aizkraukle
- Bebri Parish
- Daudzese Parish
- Irši Parish
- Jaunjelgava Parish
- Jaunjelgava
- Klintaine Parish
- Koknese Parish
- Koknese
- Mazzalve Parish
- Nereta Parish
- Pilskalne Parish
- Pļaviņas
- Sece Parish
- Sērene Parish
- Skrīveri Parish
- Staburags Parish
- Sunākste Parish
- Vietalva Parish
- Zalve Parish

== Notable people ==
- Herman Rosenthal (1843 in Jaunjelgava – 1917), an American author, editor, and librarian.
- Kārlis Balodis (1864 in Aizkraukle Municipality – 1931), a Latvian economist, statistician and demographist.
- Pēteris Stučka (1865 in Koknese – 1932), a Latvian jurist and communist politician
- Andrejs Auzāns (1871 in Pļaviņas Municipality – 1953), a Latvian army general and topographer.
- Jorģis Zemitāns (1873 in Skrīveri parish – 1928), army commander during the Latvian War of Independence
- Andrejs Upīts (1877 in Skrīveri – 1970), a Latvian teacher, poet and short story writer.
- Vladimir Myasishchev (1893 in Jaunjelgava – 1973), a Soviet psychiatrist and developmental psychologist
- Dagnija Staķe (born 1951 in Vietalva parish), politician, Minister of Regional Development and Local Governments in 2010.

=== Sport ===
- Roberts Plūme (1897 in Jaunjelgava – 1956), cyclist and cross-country skier at the 1924 Winter Olympics and 1928 Summer Olympics
- Roberts Lapainis (1913 in Sece Parish – 1947), an ice hockey goaltender, competed at the 1936 Summer Olympics
- Inese Jaunzeme (1932 in Pļaviņas – 2011), javelin thrower and gold medallist at the 1956 Summer Olympics
- Ineta Kravale (born 1959 in Pļaviņas) cross-country skier, competed at the 1994 Winter Olympics
- Raimonds Bergmanis (born 1966 in Pļaviņas), weightlifter, politician and former Minister of Defence.
- Jānis Hermanis (born 1970 in Vietalva Parish), cross-country skier, competed at the 1992, 1994 and the 1998 Winter Olympics

== Twin towns – sister cities ==
Aizkraukle is twinned with:

- Biržai, Lithuania
- Eppstein, Germany
- Kiskunhalas, Hungary
- Slavutych, Ukraine
- Tczew, Poland
- Thale, Germany

== Images ==
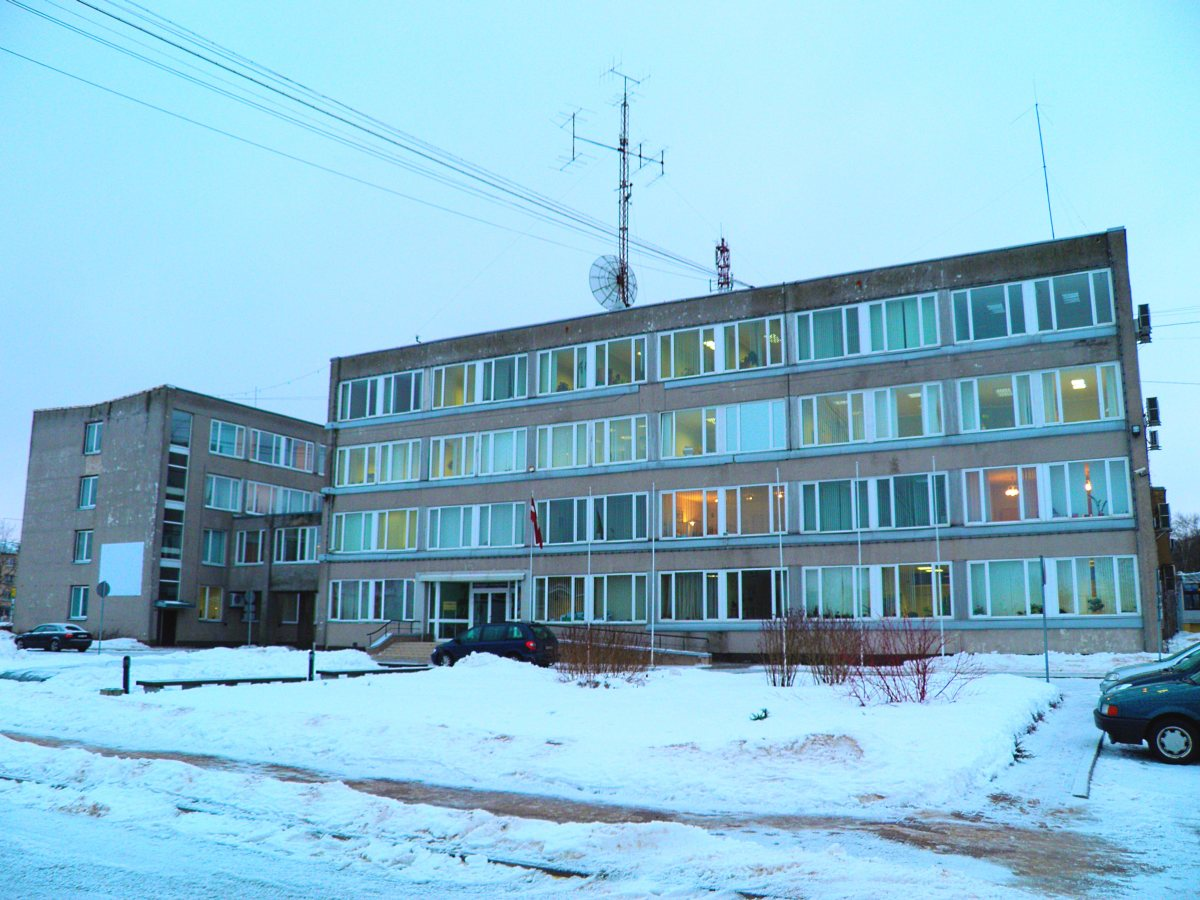
Aizkraukle Municipality Council building

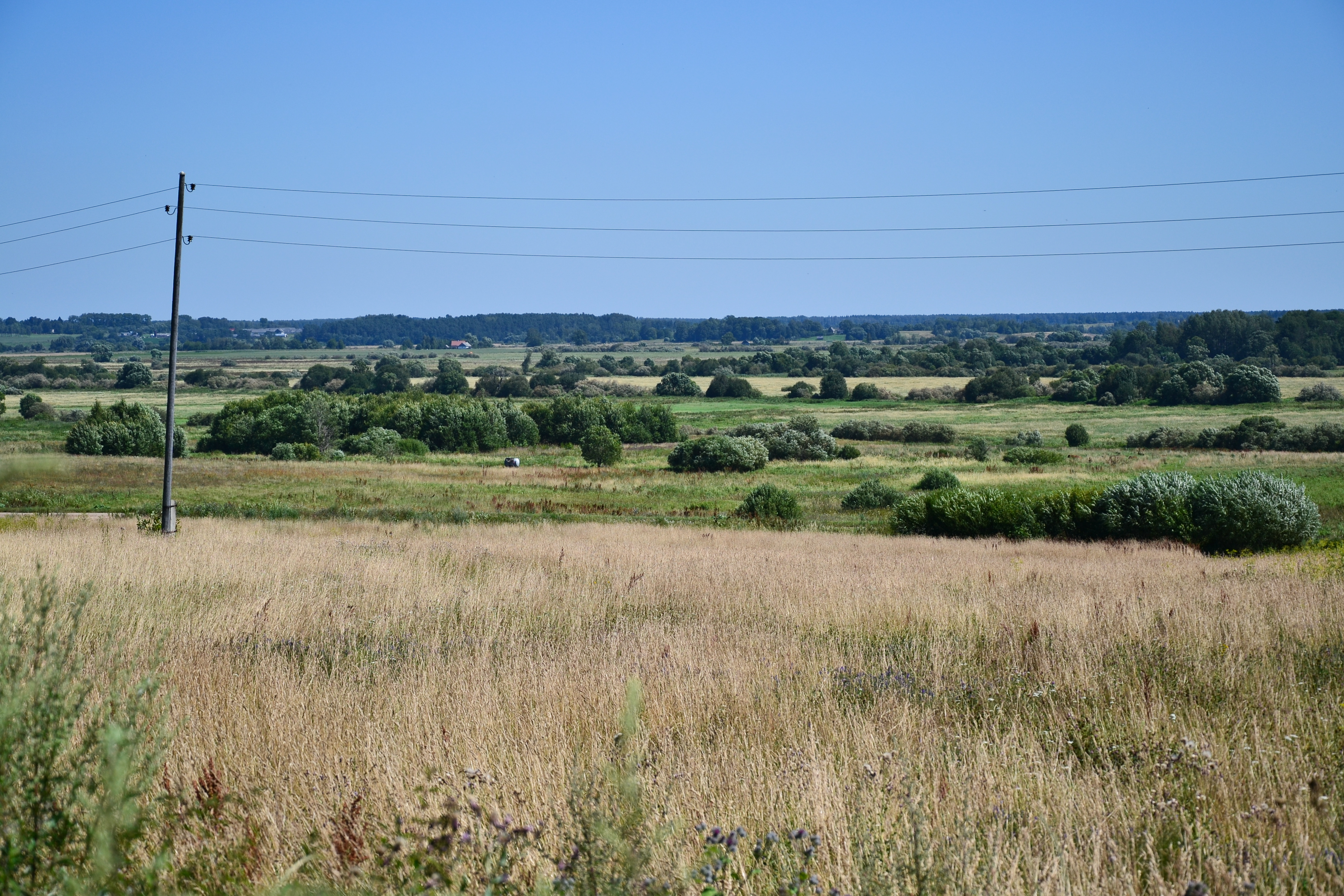
Landscape in Pilskalne Parish

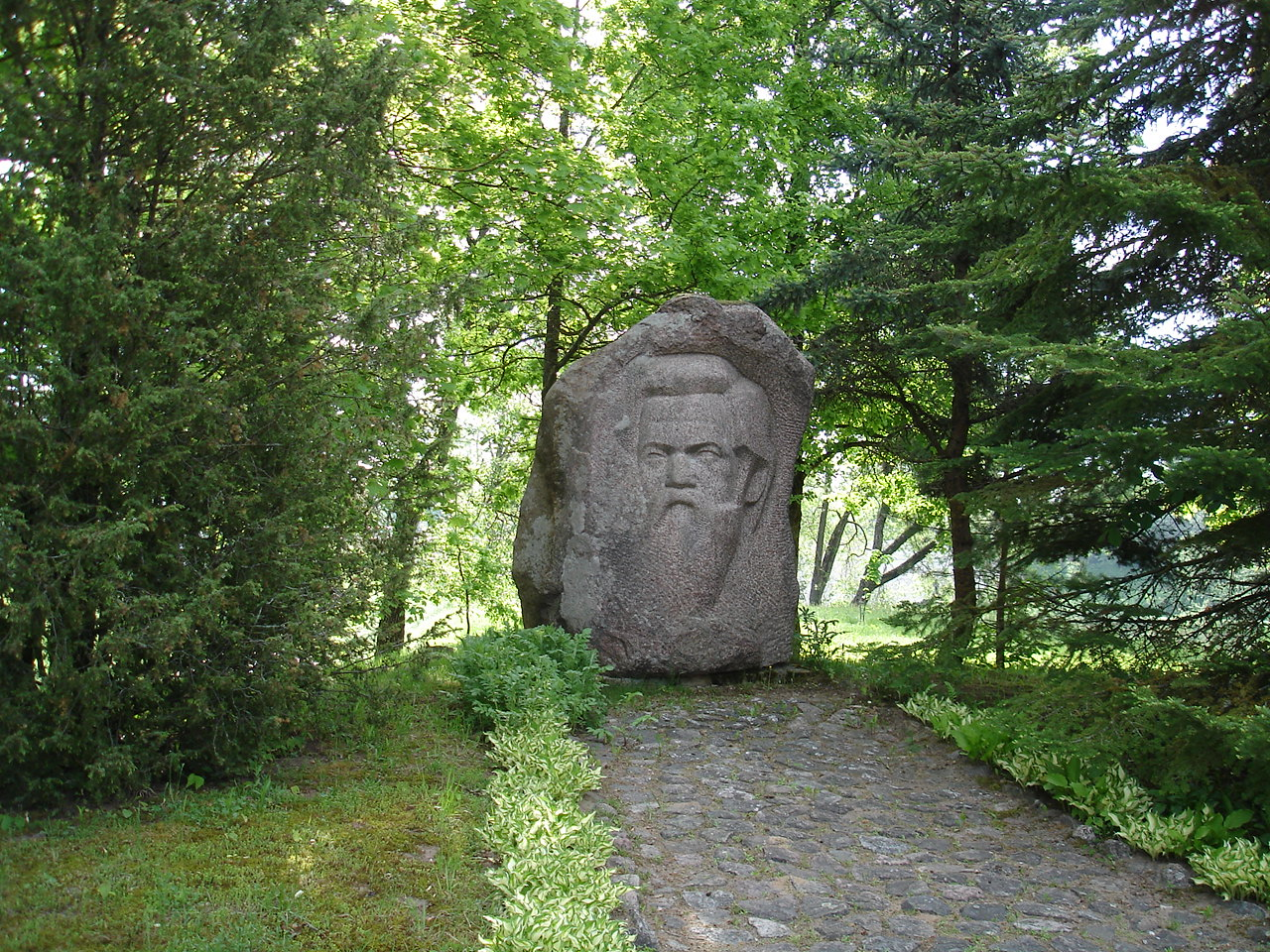
Monument to Jānis Jaunsudrabiņš in Nereta Parish

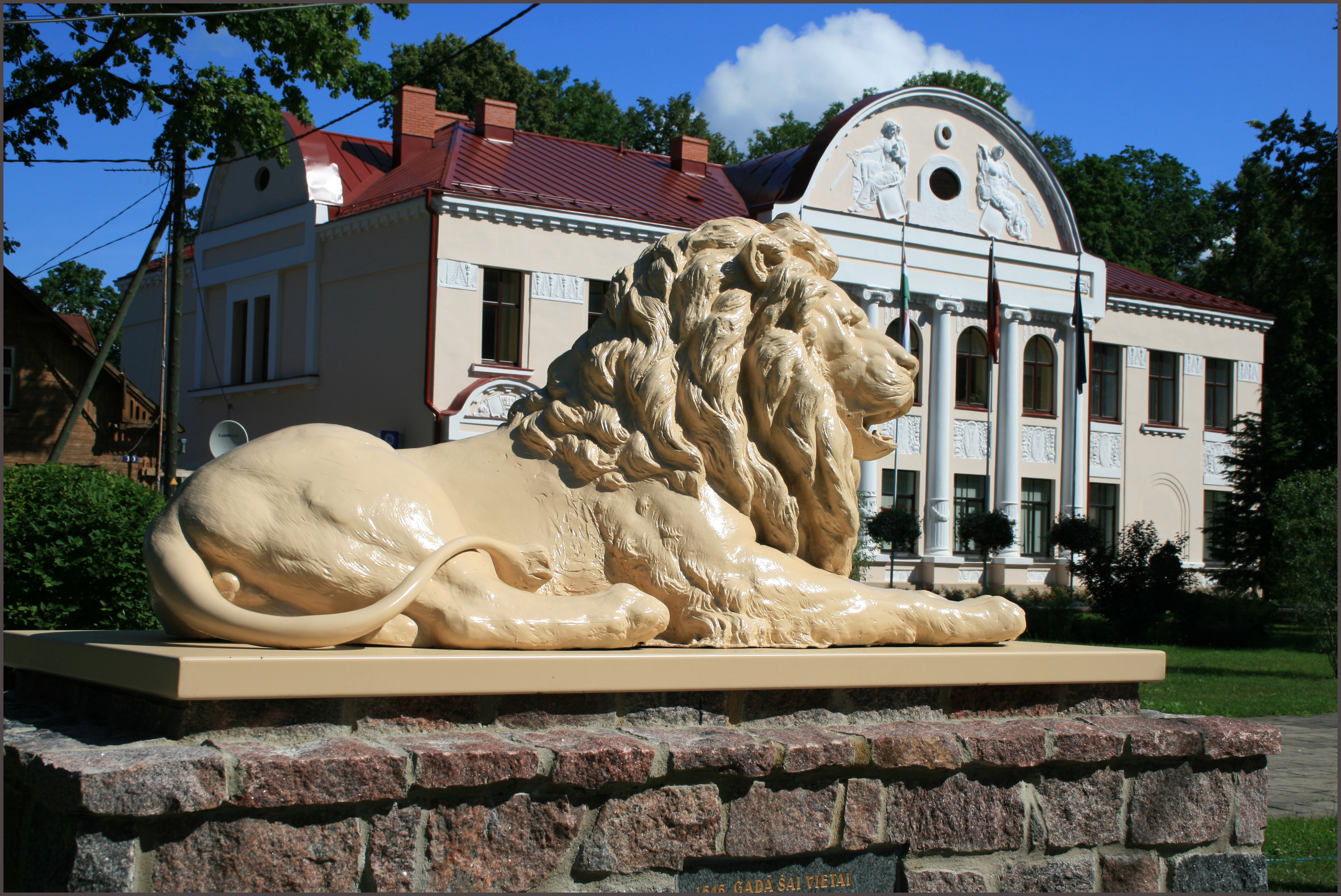
Jaunjelgava Parish administration building

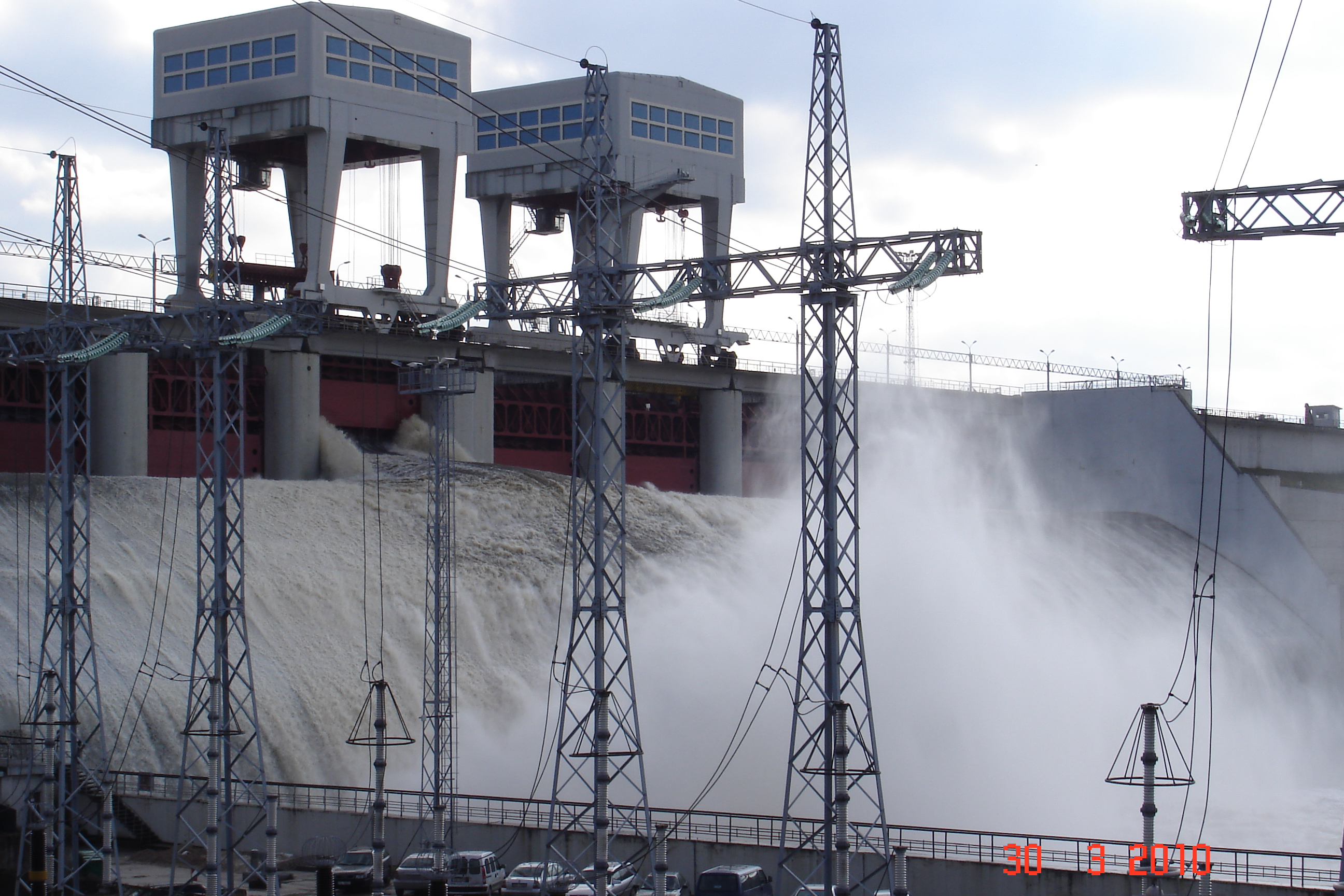
Pļaviņas Hydroelectric Power Station

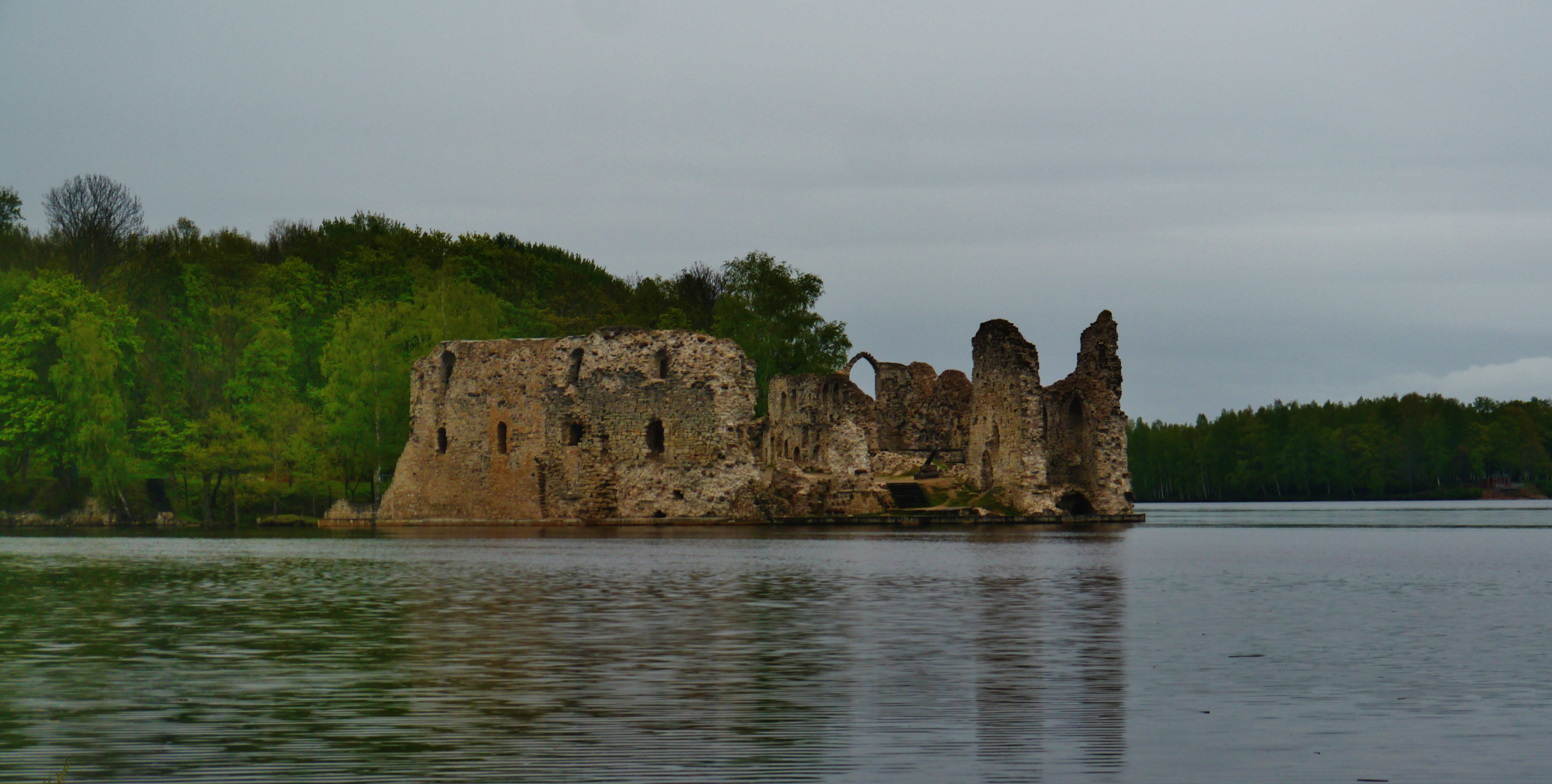
Koknese Castle Ruins

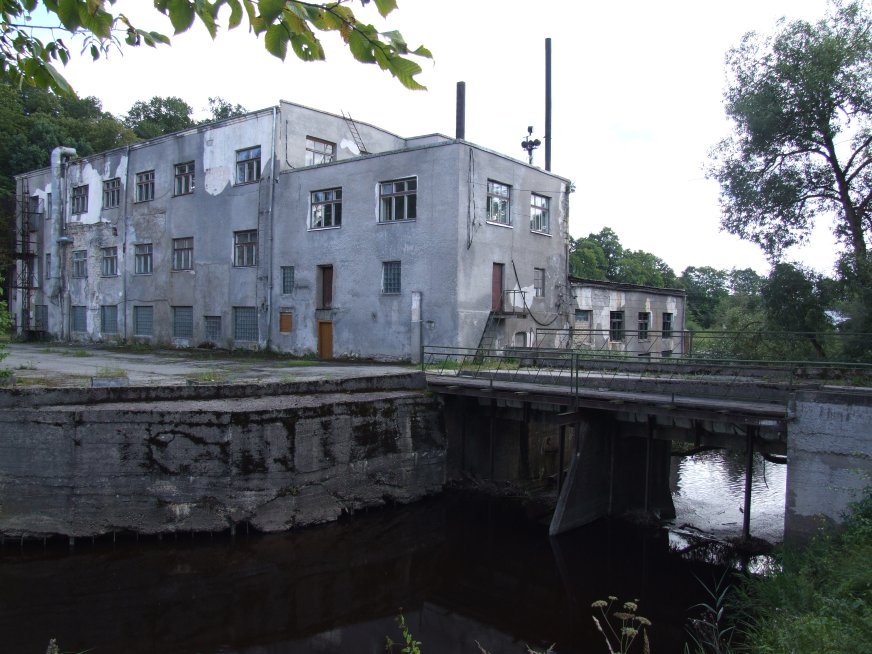
Skrīveri Confectionary Plant, notable for its Gotiņa milk caramels

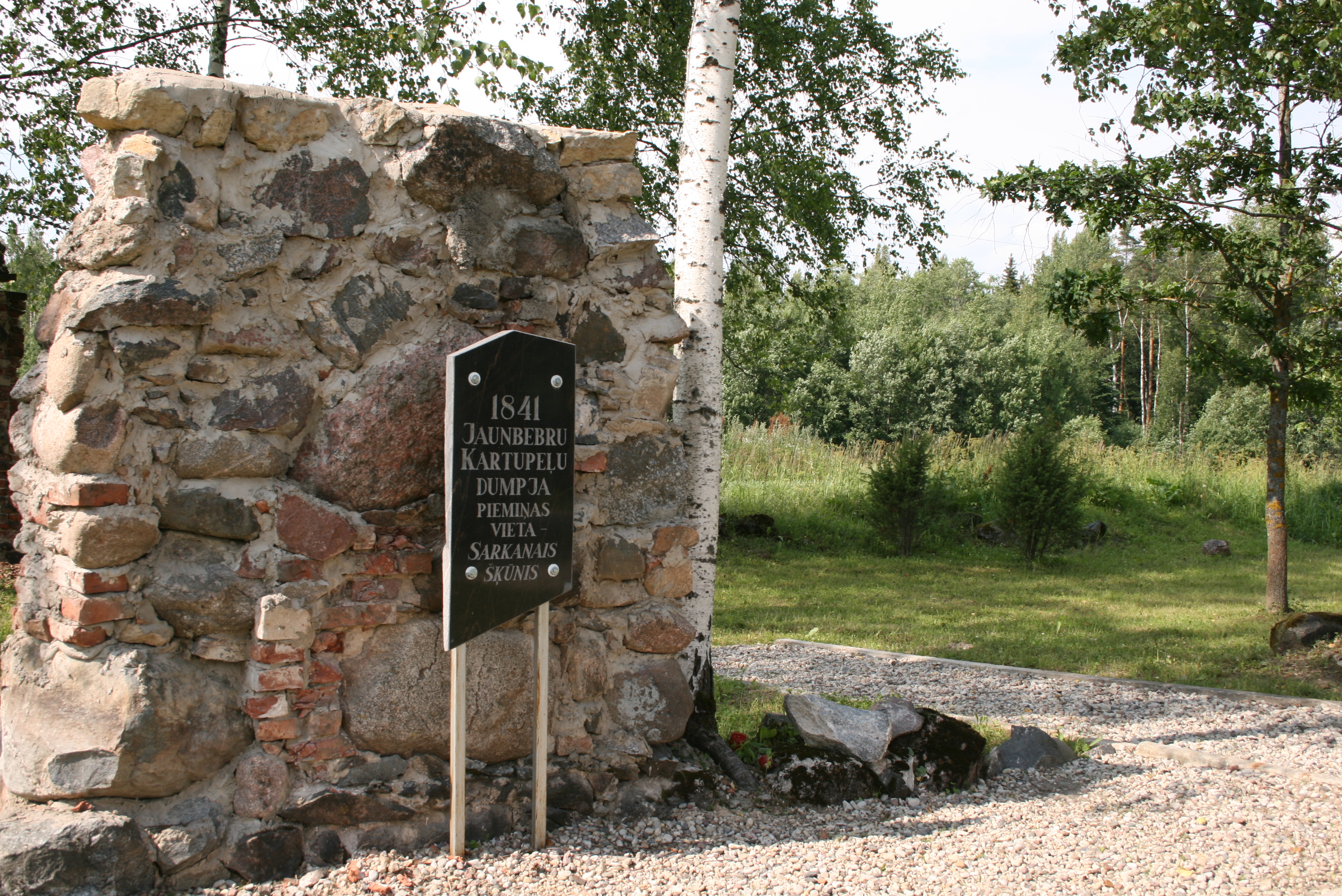
Bebri Potato Mutiny of 1841 Memorial in Jaunbebri Manor

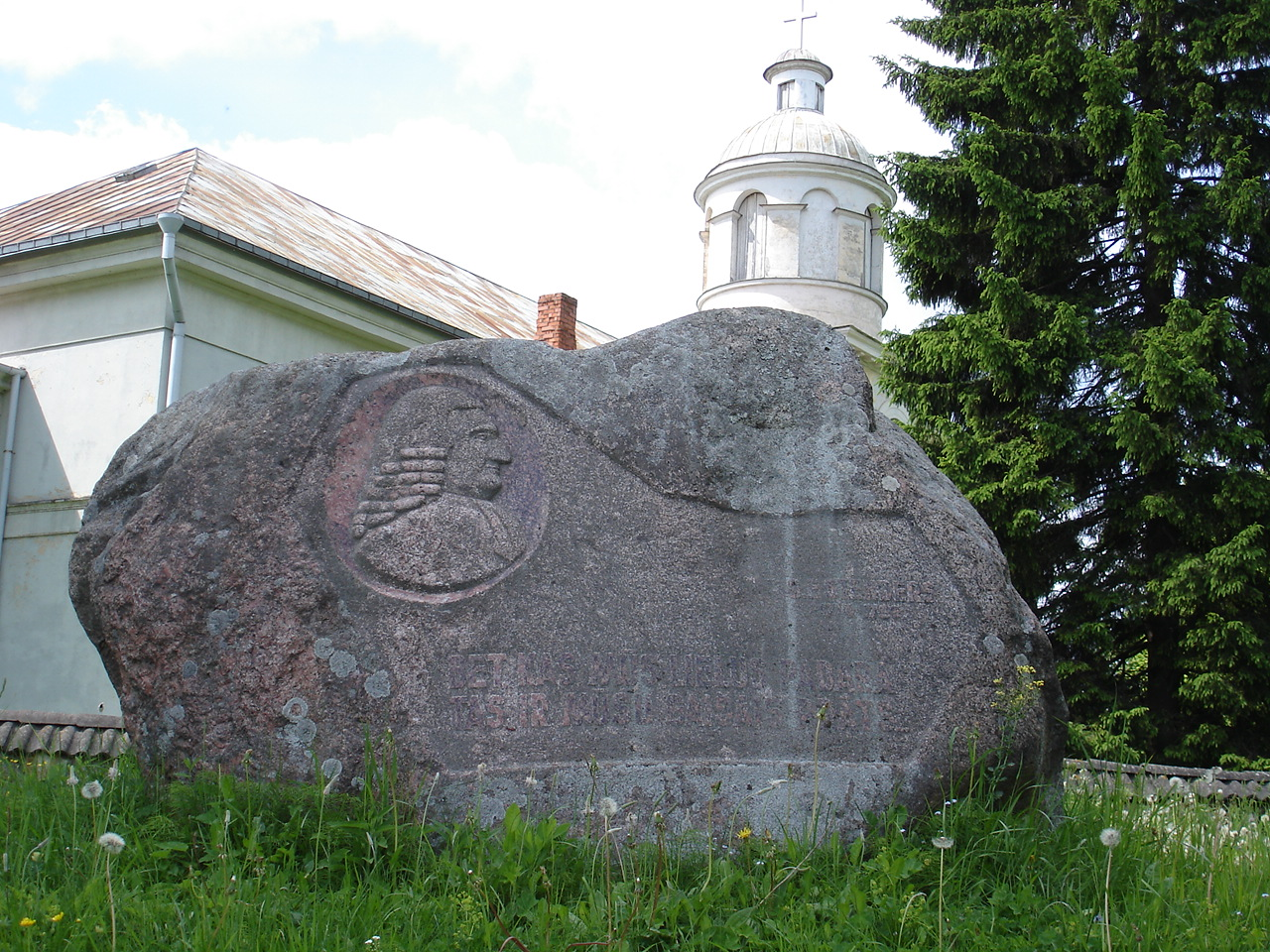
Monument to folklorist Gotthard Friedrich Stender at Sunākste Church
