= Skrīveri Station =

Railway station in Latvia

Skrīveri
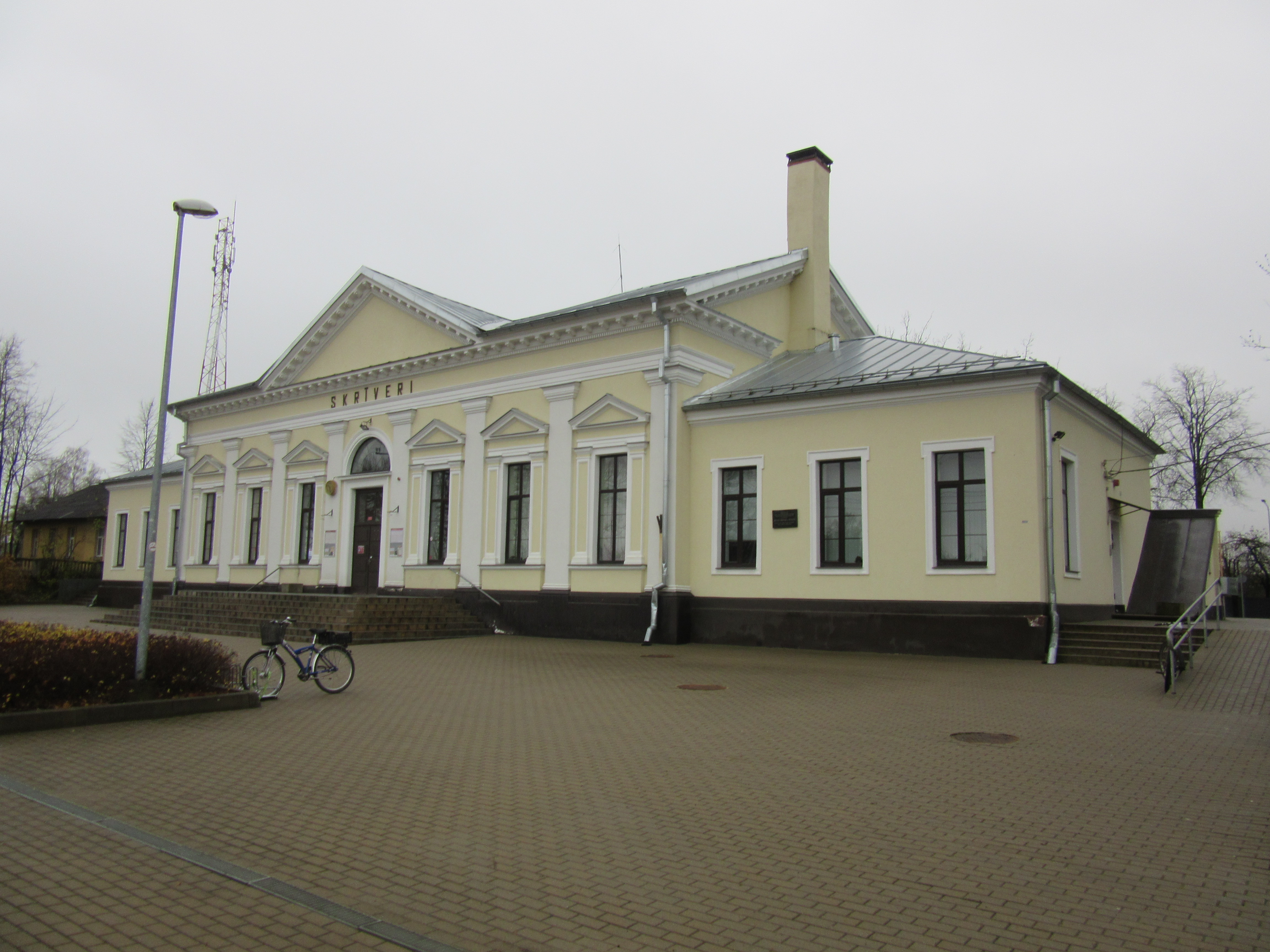

General information
- Location: Skrīveri, Aizkraukle Municipality
- Coordinates: 56°38′50.71″N 25°7′22.15″E
- Platforms: 2
- Tracks: 4

History
- Opened: 1861
- Former names: Römershof

Services
Preceding station	LDz	Following station
Jumprava towards Riga	Riga–Daugavpils	Muldakmens towards Daugavpils
Location
- Location within Latvia railways

Skrīveri Station is a railway station on the Riga–Daugavpils Railway, Latvia.
