= Teika (disambiguation) =

Teika may refer to:

- Teika, a neighbourhood of Riga, Latvia
- Fujiwara no Teika, a Japanese scholar of the late Heian and early Kamakura periods
- 8305 Teika, a main-belt asteroid
