= Aiviekste Parish =

- parish of Latvia
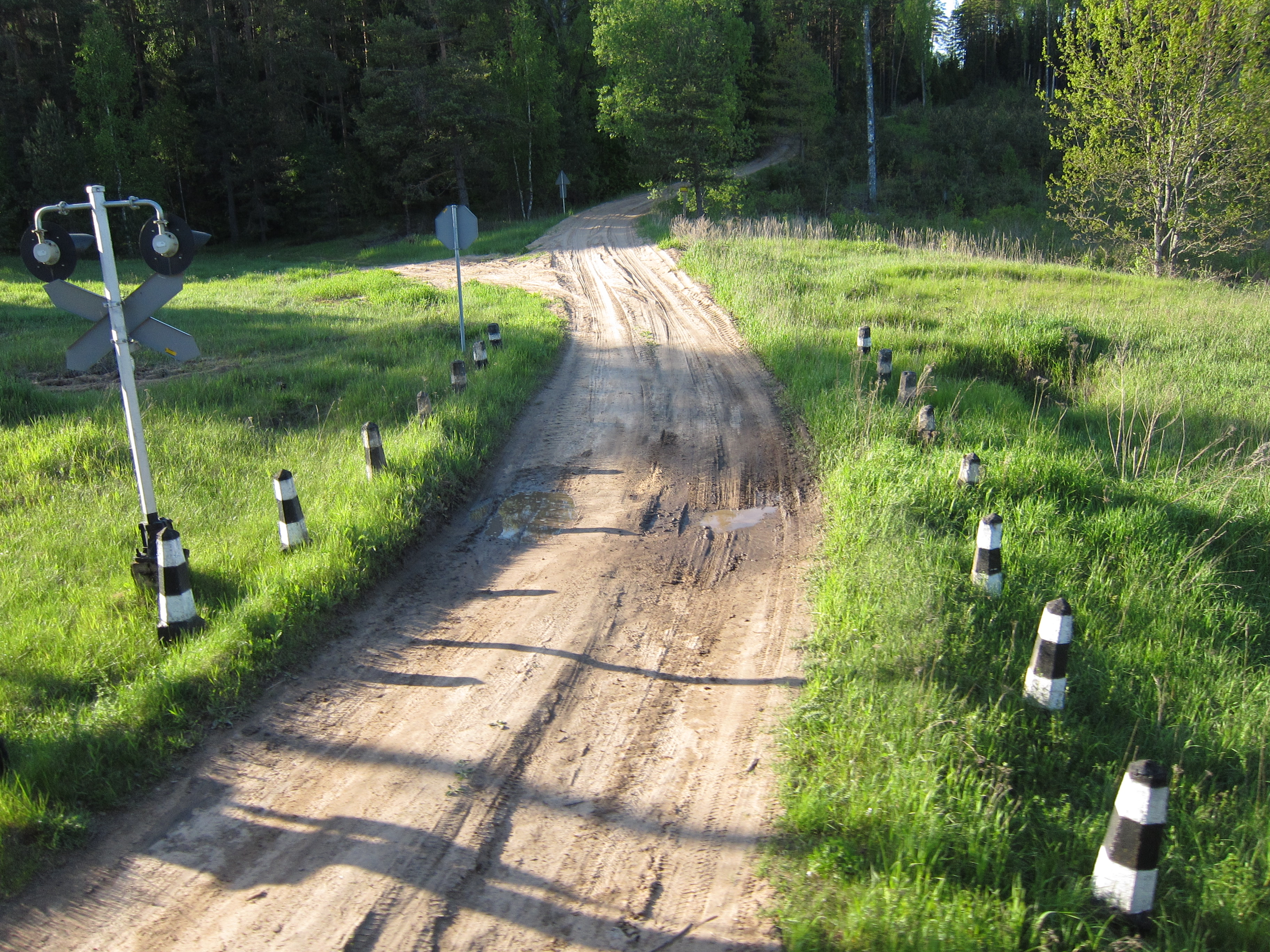

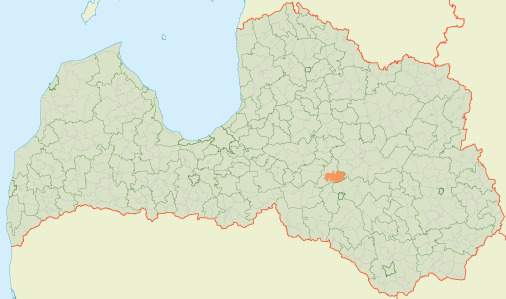
- 56°39′36″N 25°47′27″E
- Country: Latvia

Area
  - Total: 138.08 km^{2} (53.31 sq mi)
  - Land: 138.08 km^{2} (53.31 sq mi)
  - Water: 6.71 km^{2} (2.59 sq mi)

Population (1 January 2024)
  - Total: 539
  - Density: 3.9/km^{2} (10/sq mi)

Aiviekste Parish (Latvian: Aiviekstes pagasts) is an administrative unit of Aizkraukle Municipality, Latvia. The administrative center is Kriškalni. As of 2024, the population of Aiviekste Parish is 539.

Before 2021, the parish had been a part of Daugavpils county, Jēkabpils county, Pļaviņas district, Krustpils district, Aizkraukle district and Pļaviņas Municipality. Latvian law defines Aiviekste Parish as belonging partly to the Vidzeme region and partly to Latgale.

== Towns, villages and settlements of Aiviekste Parish ==
- Aizpurves
- Āpēni
- Draudavas
- Ezerkrasti
- Ģeriņi
- Īvāni
- Juči
- Kriškalni (parish center)
- Ķūģi
- Maiļupsala
- Mālkalni
- Mežezers
- Ozolsala
