= Aizkraukle Parish =

Parish of Latvia

- parish of Latvia
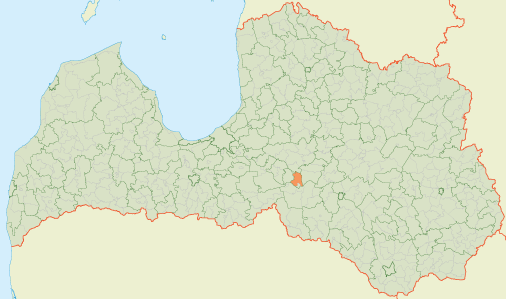
- 56°38′41″N 25°13′49″E
- Country: Latvia

Area
  - Total: 89.31 km^{2} (34.48 sq mi)
  - Land: 85.79 km^{2} (33.12 sq mi)
  - Water: 3.52 km^{2} (1.36 sq mi)

Population (1 January 2024)
  - Total: 914
  - Density: 10/km^{2} (27/sq mi)

Aizkraukle Parish (Latvian: Aizkraukles pagasts) is an administrative unit of Aizkraukle Municipality in the Vidzeme region of Latvia.
