= Jorģis Zemitāns =

Latvian Northern Brigade officer (1873–1928)

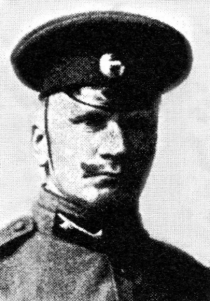
- Born: February 23, 1873; Skrīveri parish, Russian Empire
- Died: 16 January 1928 (aged 54) Rīga, Latvia
- Allegiance: 1892–1918 (Russia) Russian Empire; 1918–1922 Latvia
- Service years: 1892–1922
- Rank: Colonel
- Conflicts: World War I Latvian War of Independence; Estonian War of Independence

Jorģis Zemitāns (23 February 1873, Skrīveri parish – 16 January 1928, Riga) was an army officer and commander of the Latvian Northern Brigade during the Latvian War of Independence.

== Biography ==
Jorģis Zemitāns was born on 23 February 1873 in Skrīveri parish, Livonia Governorate. In 1892 he graduated Realschule in Mitau (Jelgava) and joined the army of the Russian Empire in 1892 and completed his military education at the Vilnius Military Academy in 1897. He became an officer in 116th. Malojaroslavec infantry regiment which was stationed in Riga.

=== World War I ===
When World War I started in 1914 he was promoted to captain and together with the whole regiment deployed to the front. Together with XX Army corps he fought in East Prussia. In January 1915, the entire XX Army corps was destroyed in the Augustów forest's and Zemitāns was taken Prisoner of War in February 1915. He spent the remainder of the war in the German POW camps and was released from captivity in December 1918.

=== Latvian War of Independence ===
Zemitāns played one of the leading roles during the Latvian War of Independence. After his release from captivity he returns to Riga. On 7 December 1918 he joined the new Latvian Army and was involved in organising the first armed units. He organised and became commander of 2nd. Riga defence company. However those Riga defence companies proved to be very disloyal and mutinous and soon were disbanded. Beginning on 10 January 1919, he was promoted to Latvian military charge d'affaires in Estonia and together with Latvian officer in Estonian service Voldemārs Ozols began organising the formation of Latvian defence units in Tallinn, Pärnu and Tartu. On 2 February he was promoted to organiser and commander in chief of the Latvian Northern Brigade. After German coup on 16 April 1919 he was first Latvian senior officer who proclaimed that he maintains full loyalty to Ulmanis provisional government. He led the brigade in the fight for liberation in Northern Vidzeme during the Battle of Wenden, an operation conducted by General Ernst Põdder of the 3rd Estonian Division. 15 July he became commander of the Vidzeme division and the eastern front. When attack of the Bermontians started Zemitāns was commanding officer of the all Latvian units in Riga front. He failed to organise the defence of Riga and left bank of the Daugava and was dismissed from duty and replaced by Mārtiņš Peniķis. From January 1920, Zemitāns worked at the Latvian Military Court and participated in development of military manuals until 1 April 1922 when he retired. Jorģis Zemitāns died on 16 January 1928 in Riga Military Hospital from a brain tumor.

Jorģis Zemitāns was awarded with the Latvian Military Order of Lāčplēsis, Estonian Cross of Liberty and the Russian Order of St. Vladimir.

=== Legacy ===
The Zemitāni Railway Station in Riga was renamed in honor of Zemitāns in 1928, as is a nearby overpass (Jorģa Zemitāna tilts, officially renamed in 2014). A square in the Teika neighborhood of Riga also bears his name (Zemitāna laukums) since 1930 and features a monument dedicated to him, unveiled in 1995. The monument was sculpted by Gunta Zemīte.

The Skrīveri Elementary School in his native Skrīveri bears his name. Streets (Zemitāna iela) named after him are located in Riga, Liepāja, Skrīveri and Strenči.

== See also ==
- Latvian War of Independence
- Freikorps in the Baltic
- West Russian Volunteer Army
