= Jaunjelgava Municipality =

Municipality of Latvia

Coordinates: 56.514806°N 25.30426°E

Jaunjelgava Municipality Jaunjelgavas novads
- Municipality
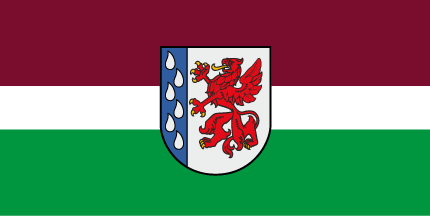
- Flag Coat of arms

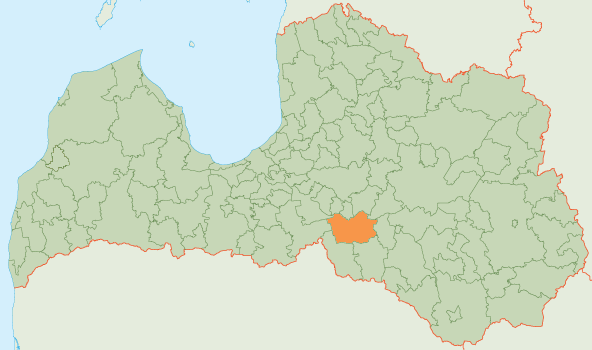
- Country: Latvia
- Formed: 2009
- Centre: Jaunjelgava

Government
  - Chairman: Guntis Libeks (V)

Area
  - Total: 684.64 km^{2} (264.34 sq mi)
  - Land: 660.12 km^{2} (254.87 sq mi)
  - Water: 24.52 km^{2} (9.47 sq mi)

Population (2021)
  - Total: 5,039
  - Density: 7.633/km^{2} (19.77/sq mi)
- Website: www.jaunjelgava.lv

Jaunjelgava Municipality (Latvian: Jaunjelgavas novads) is a former municipality in Selonia, Latvia. The municipality was formed in 2009 by merging Sece parish, Sērene parish, Staburags parish, Sunākste parish and Jaunjelgava town with its countryside territory, with the administrative centre being Jaunjelgava. In 2010 Jaunjelgava parish was created from the countryside territory of Jaunjelgava town. The population in 2020 was 5,061.

On 1 July 2021, Jaunjelgava Municipality ceased to exist and its territory was merged into Aizkraukle Municipality.

== See also ==
- Administrative divisions of Latvia (2009)
