= Skrīveri Parish =

Parish in Aizkraukle Municipality, Latvia

Coordinates: 56°38′48″N 25°07′20″E

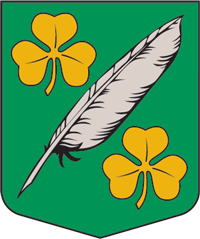
Coat of arms

Skrīveri Parish (Latvian: Skrīveru pagasts) is an administrative unit of Aizkraukle Municipality in the Vidzeme region of Latvia. The center of the parish is Skrīveri.

From 2009 to 2021 the parish existed as a separate Skrīveri Municipality.

== Towns, villages and settlements of Skrīveri Parish ==
- Klidziņa
- Līči
- Skrīveri – parish administrative center
- Ziedugravas

== Notable people ==
- Andrejs Upīts
- Jorģis Zemitāns
