= Teika, Riga =

Neighborhood of Riga, Latvia

Coordinates: 56.9700°N 24.1800°E

Teika
- Neighborhood of Riga
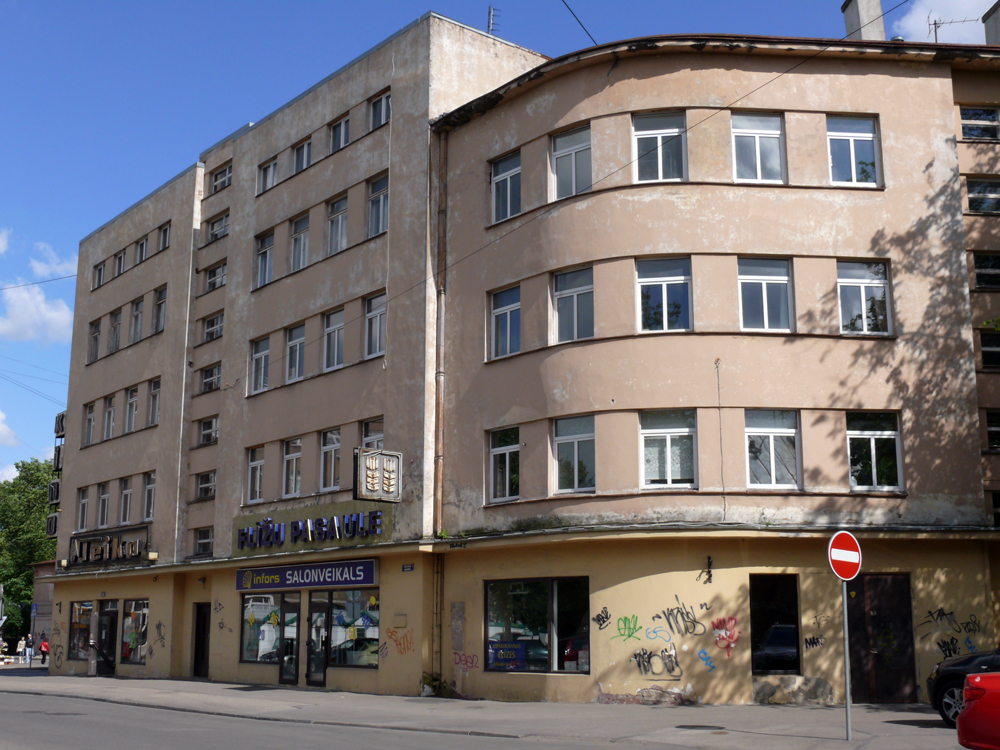
- The former Teika Cinema built in the 1930s

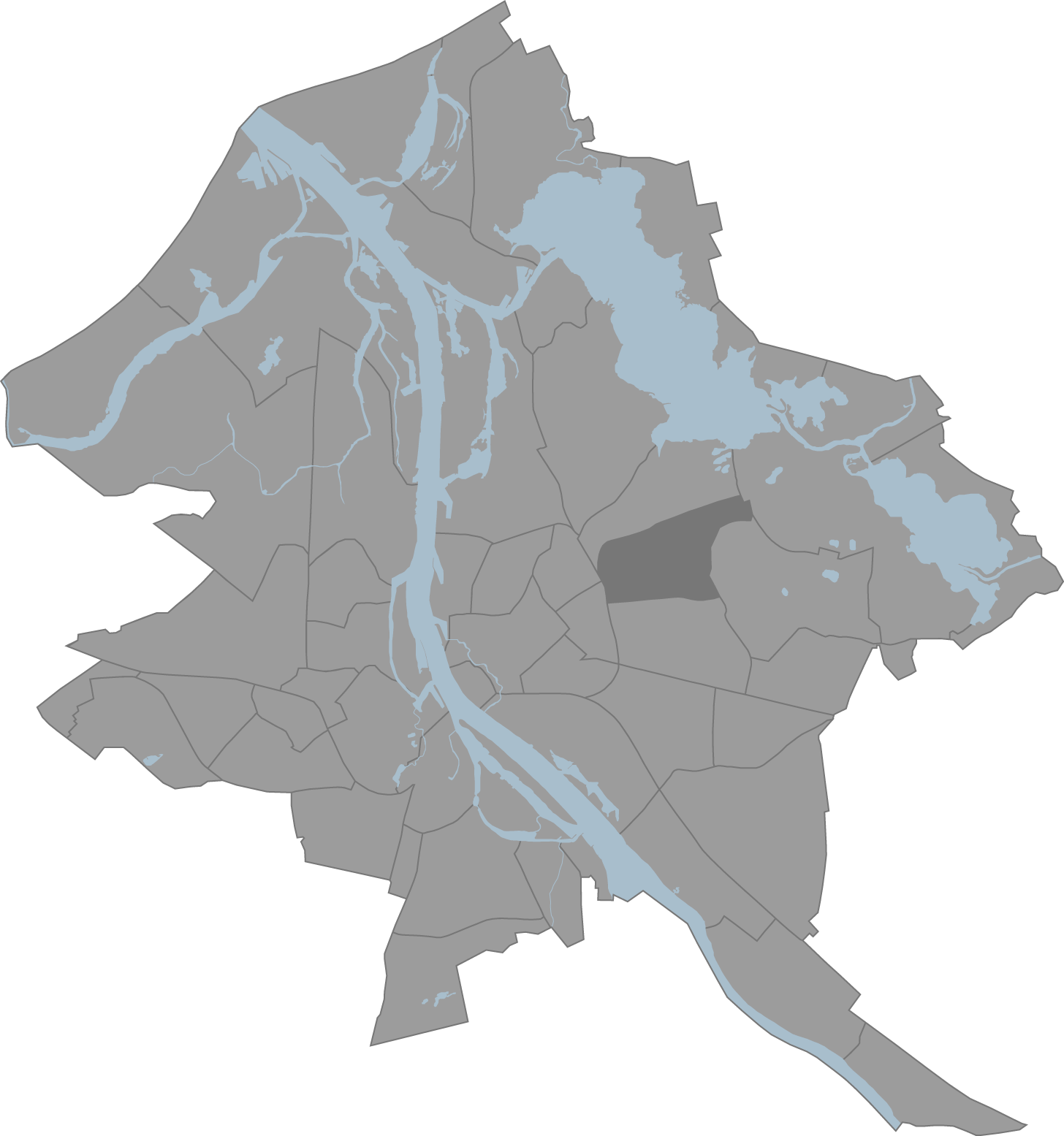
- Location in Riga
- Country: Latvia
- City: Riga
- District: Vidzeme Suburb

Area
  - Total: 4.682 km^{2} (1.808 sq mi)

Population (2024)
  - Total: 28,428
  - Density: 6,072/km^{2} (15,730/sq mi)
- Time zone: UTC+2 (EET)
  - Summer (DST): UTC+3 (EEST)
- Website: apkaimes.lv

Teika is a neighbourhood in the Vidzeme Suburb of Riga, the capital of Latvia.

Teika is the only neighbourhood in Riga which was planned and partly built in the 1920s and 1930s during interwar Latvia. Built up areas consist mainly from 1- to 2-storey family houses, but there are also 5-storey apartment houses, especially around Brīvības street and Zemitāns Square. Teika was planned as a very modern district for those times and today is known for its Functionalist architecture which was widely practiced there.

== Gallery ==
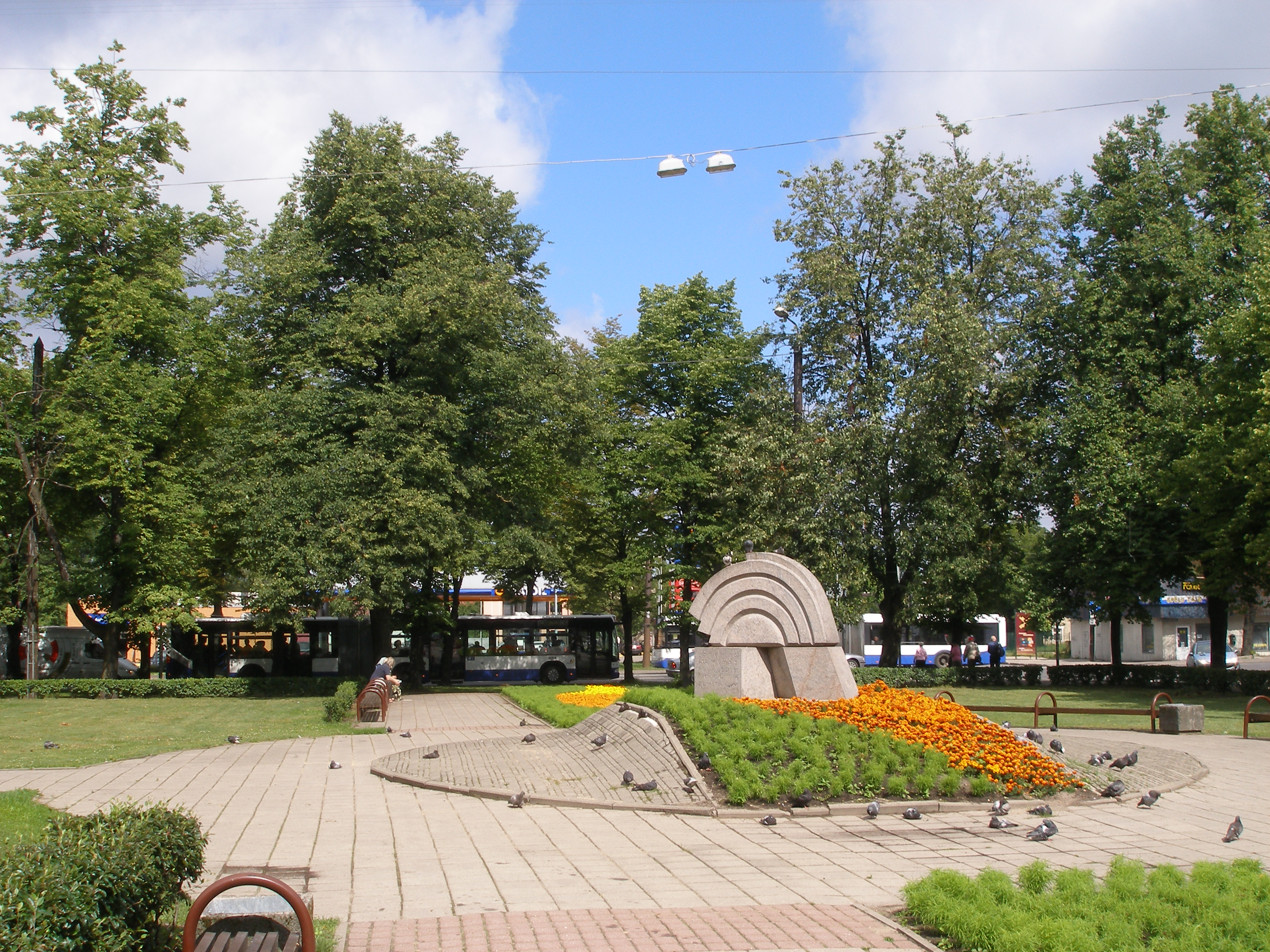
Monument to Jorģis Zemitāns in Zemitāns Square

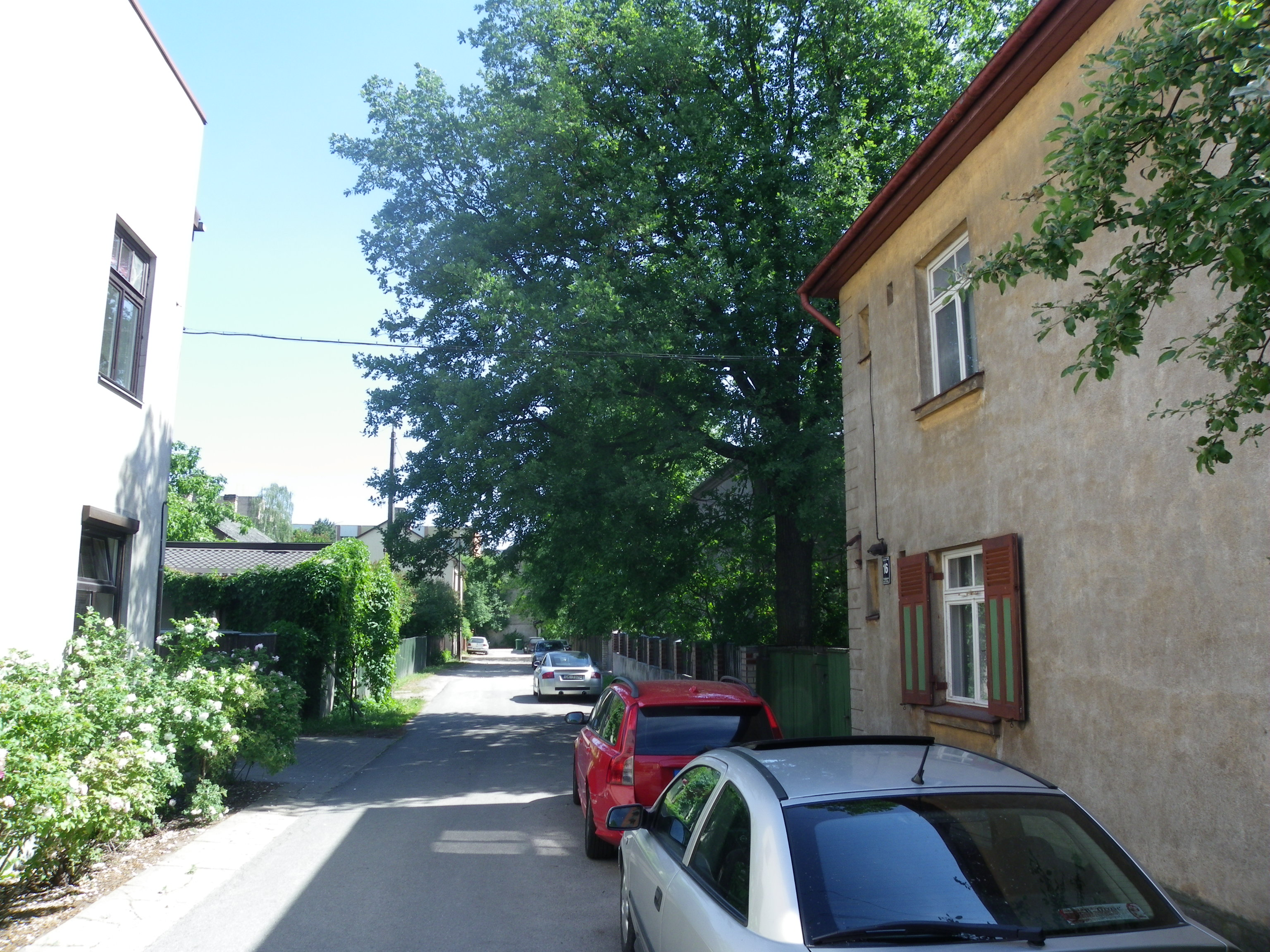
Piebalgas street in Teika

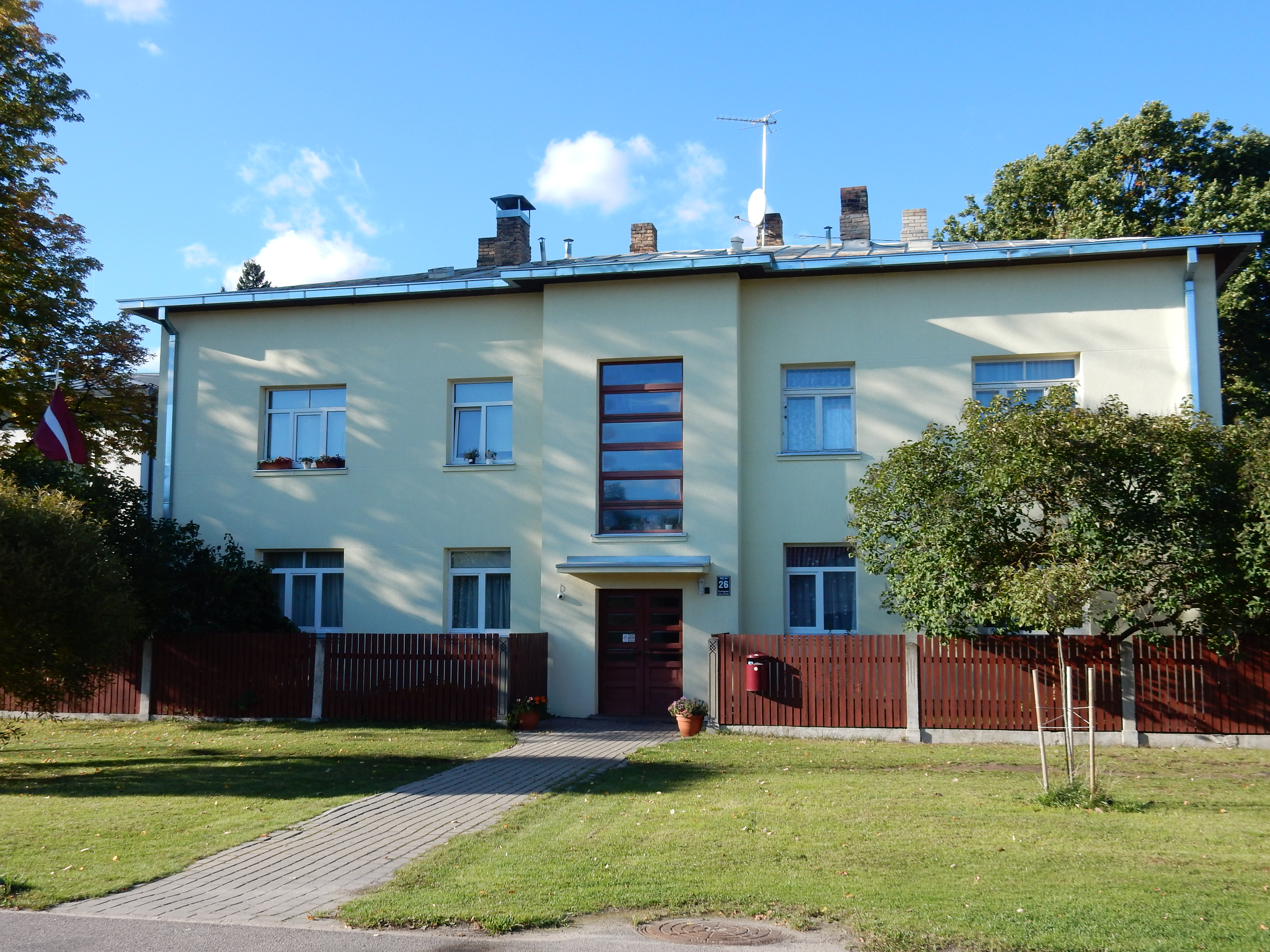
Functionalist residential house on Āraišu street.

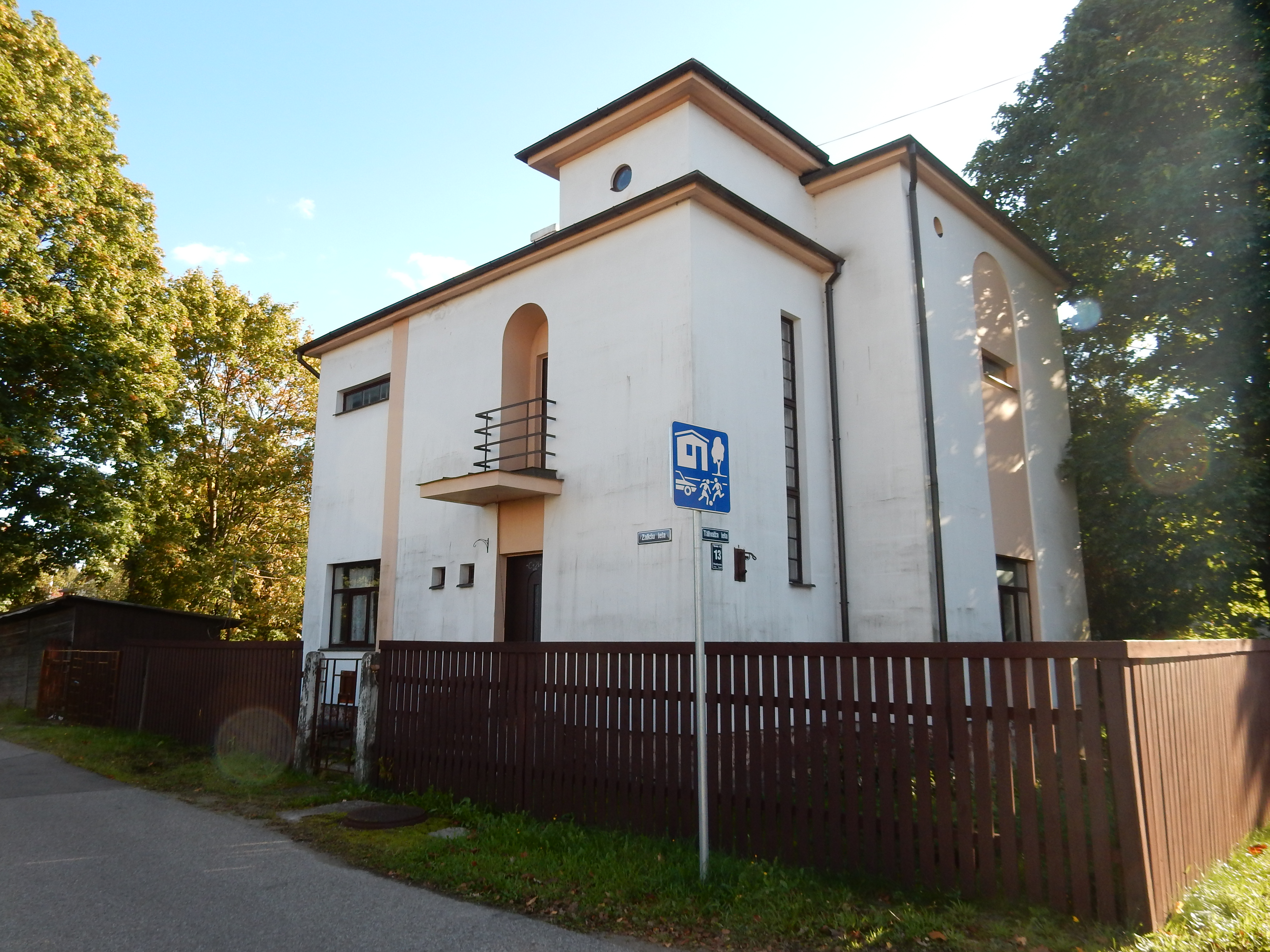
Functionalist mansion on Lielvārdes street.

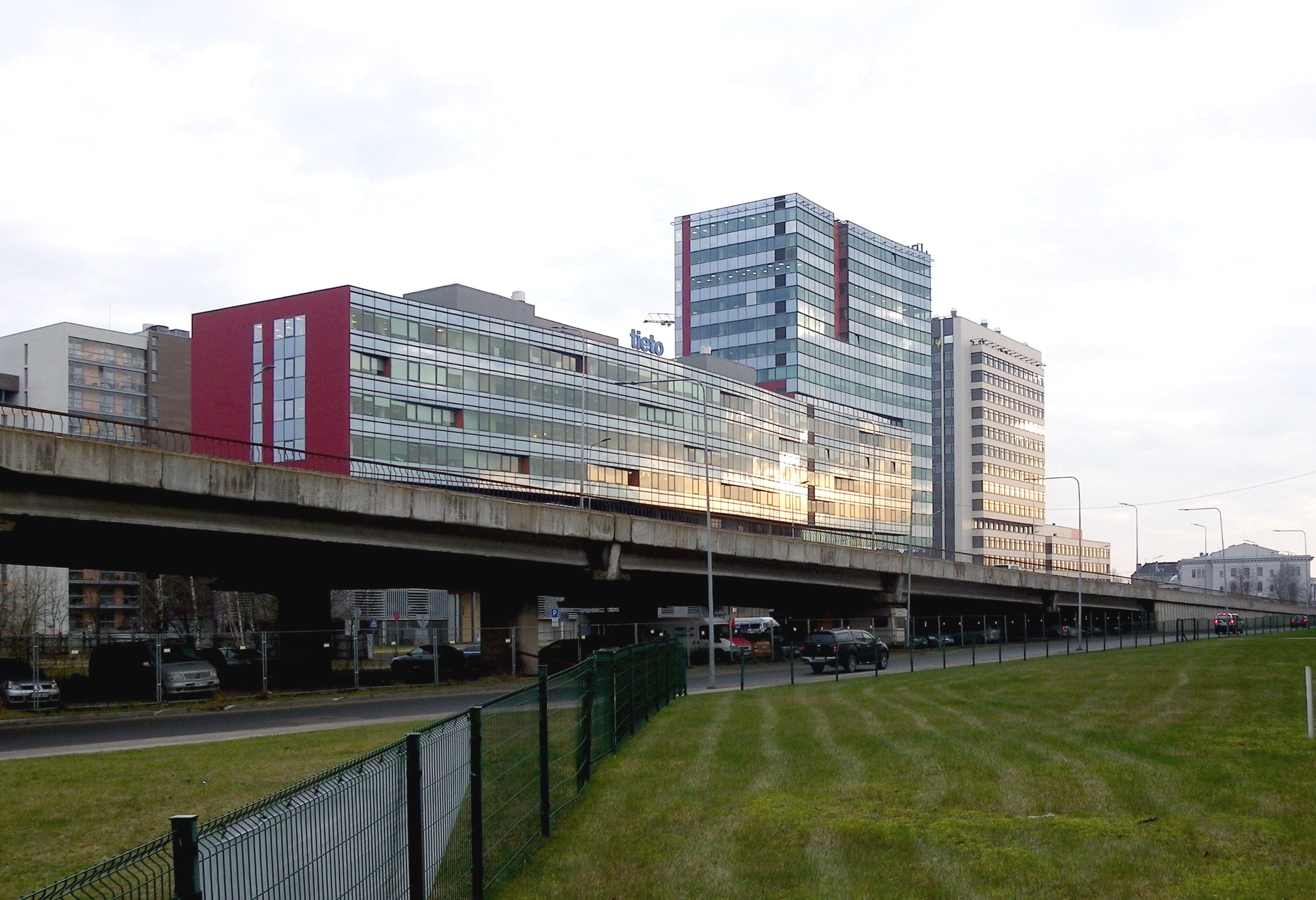
Modern residential and office building complex Jaunā Teika (New Teika).
