= Sece =

Sece Сеҗе
- selo
- Location within Tatarstan
- Country: Russia
- Region: Tatarstan
- District: Arça District
- Municipality: Sece rural settlement
- Time zone: UTC+3:00

Sece (Tatar: Сеҗе, romanized: Sece) is a rural locality (a selo) in Arça District, Tatarstan. The population was 279 as of 2010. Sece is located 25 km from Arça, district's administrative centre, and 91 km from Ԛazаn, republic's capital, by road. The village was established in 17th century. There are 3 streets in the village.
