= Sērene Parish =

Parish of Latvia

- parish of Latvia
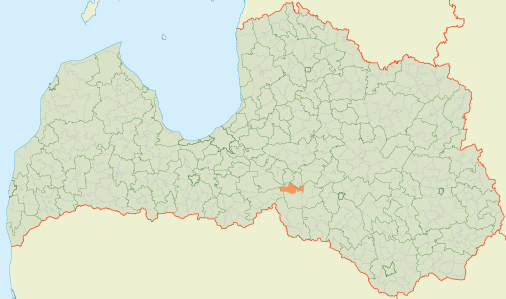
- 56°34′06″N 25°08′57″E

- Location within Latvia
- Country: Latvia

Area
  - Total: 118.95 km^{2} (45.93 sq mi)
  - Land: 112.91 km^{2} (43.59 sq mi)
  - Water: 6.04 km^{2} (2.33 sq mi)

Population (1 January 2026)
  - Total: 730
  - Density: 6.5/km^{2} (17/sq mi)

Sērene Parish (Latvian: Sērenes pagasts) is an administrative unit of Aizkraukle Municipality in the Selonia region of Latvia.

== Towns, villages and settlements of Sērene Parish ==
- Dīķi
- Krolīši
- Talsiņa
- Sērene
