= Andrejs Upīts =

Latvian writer

- Andrejs Upīts
- Born: 4 December 1877; Skrīveri, Riga County, Livonia, Russia (now Aizkraukle, Latvia)
- Died: 17 November 1970 (aged 92); Riga, Latvian Soviet Socialist Republic (SSR) (now Latvia)
- Occupations: Poet, writer, literary critic

Signature
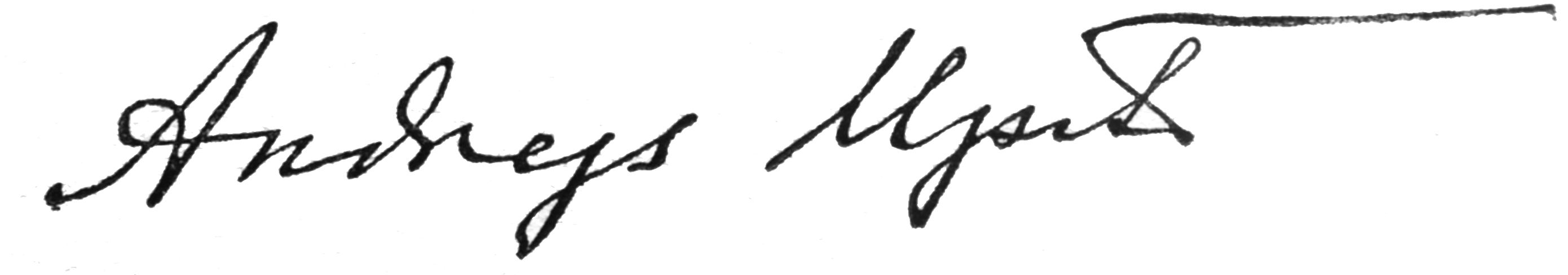

Andrejs Upīts (4 December 1877 – 17 November 1970) was a Latvian teacher, poet and short story writer.

== Career and literary activity ==
He was born in Skrīveri, Livonia. He graduated from the parish school in Skrīveri, then continued his self-study, devoting himself mainly to the study of languages such as German, Russian, English, French and Italian. He worked as a teacher, translator, and was also an active civil servant.

Andrejs Upīts, while writing for the newspaper "Mājas viesis" under the pseudonym Andrei Araji in 1892, published his first articles, Parunas, Skrīveros uzrakstītas (Recorded Proverbs of Skrīveri) (No. 15) and Kā mūsu senči agrāk Vidzemē dzīvojuši (How Our Ancestors Once Lived in Vidzeme) (No. 20). Upīts wrote novels, stories, drama, tragedy, comedy, poetry, satire, journalism, and literary criticism. His children's novel, Sūnu ciema zēni (The Boys of Moss Village), is included in the compulsory reading list of schools. He was one of the more multifaceted Latvian writers. Upīts' heroes possess striking character and he used a rich language.

Under the influence of the 1905 Revolution, Upīts began to sympathize with Marxist ideas. After the February Revolution in 1917-1918 during the German occupation, Upīts was arrested. In 1919, Upīts was the head of the art department of the Education Commission of the Latvian Socialist Soviet Republic. In 1920, after returning secretly to Latvia from Russia, he was arrested twice and was sentenced to death, from which he was saved by colleagues from cultural circles. After liberation, he lived in Riga and Skrīveri and from 1924 to 1930 worked in the editorial office of Domas magazine.

In 1940 Upīts supported the Soviet occupation of Latvia and became a member of the People's Seimas. He was appointed editor-in-chief of Karogs and served in the post until 1941. At the end of the Second World War, he became Head of the Department of Latvian Literature of the Latvian State University and founder and first director of the Institute of Language and Literature of the Academy of Sciences of the Latvian SSR from 1946 to 1952. Upīts was Chairman of the Union of Writer of the Latvian SSR from 1944 to 1954. As a politician, Upīts was deputy chairman of the Supreme Soviet of the Latvian SSR from 1941 to 1952.

After his death in 1972, the A. Upīts Museum was opened in his honor in Riga and Skrīver.

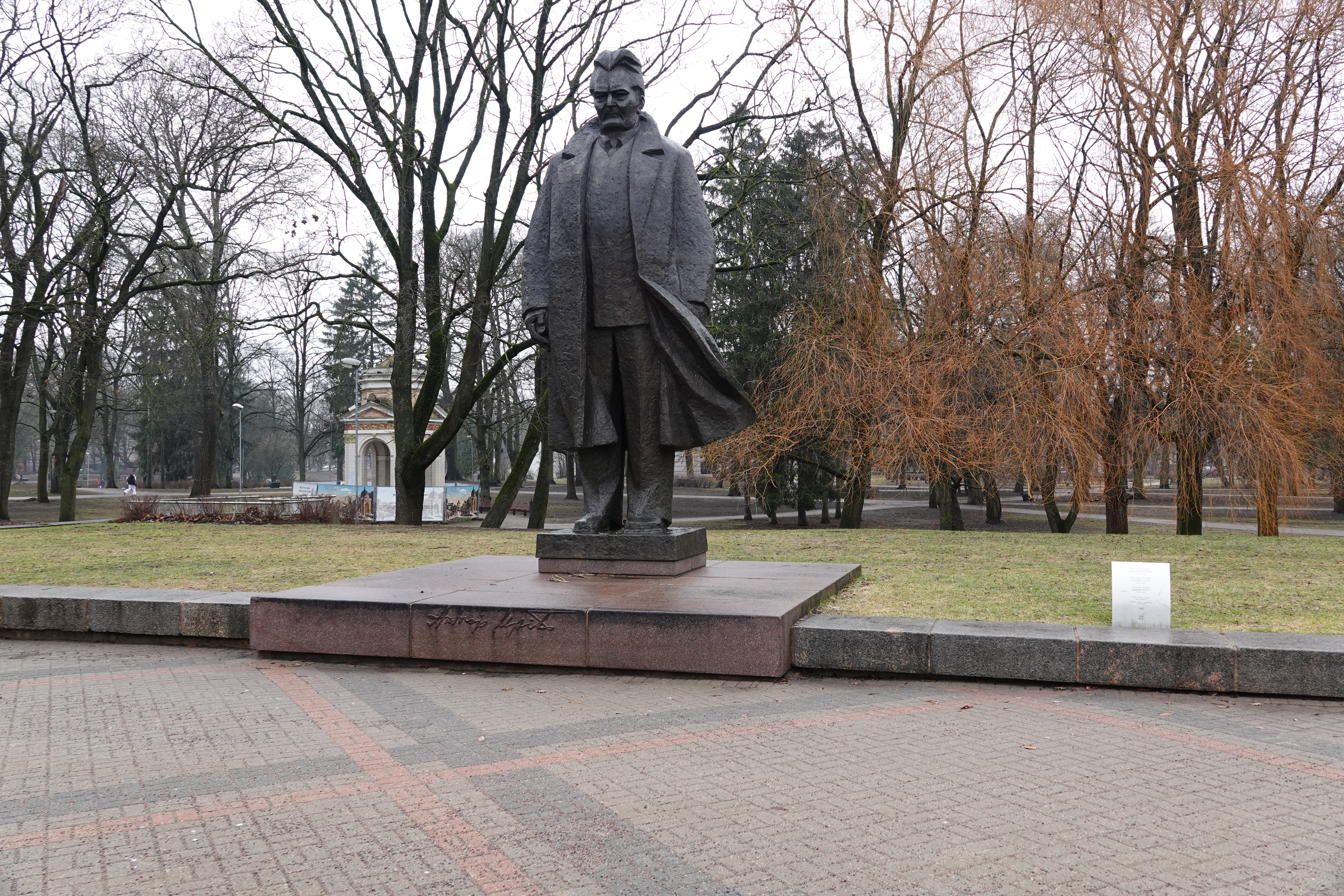
Monument of Andrejs Upīts in Latvia

His 1945 novel Zaļā zeme (Verdant Land) received the USSR State Prize in 1946. Between 1945 and 1946 he served again as the editor-in-chief of Karogs. His Sociālistiskā reālisma jautājumi literatūrā (Problems of Socialist Realism in Literature) won the Latvian SSR State Prize in 1957.

His works were banned twice: the first time after Kārlis Ulmanis' coup of 1934, and the second during the years of the Soviet regime, when his performance of his play, Ziedošais tuksnesis (The Blooming Desert) was prohibited at the Dailes Theatre and censors prohibited distribution of his book, Literatūras vēsture (The History of Literature).

On 16 October 2024 the Riga City Council approved the relocation of an Upīts monument in Riga. This monument is to be sawed in half and then reinstalled in the city with both parts at such a distance that a person can walk through both parts. According to (the father of this idea) Riga City Council deputy Ivars Drulle (Movement For!) this will signify "the positive as a writer and the negative as a Soviet collaborator - and symbolize the different sides of each person".

== Significant works ==
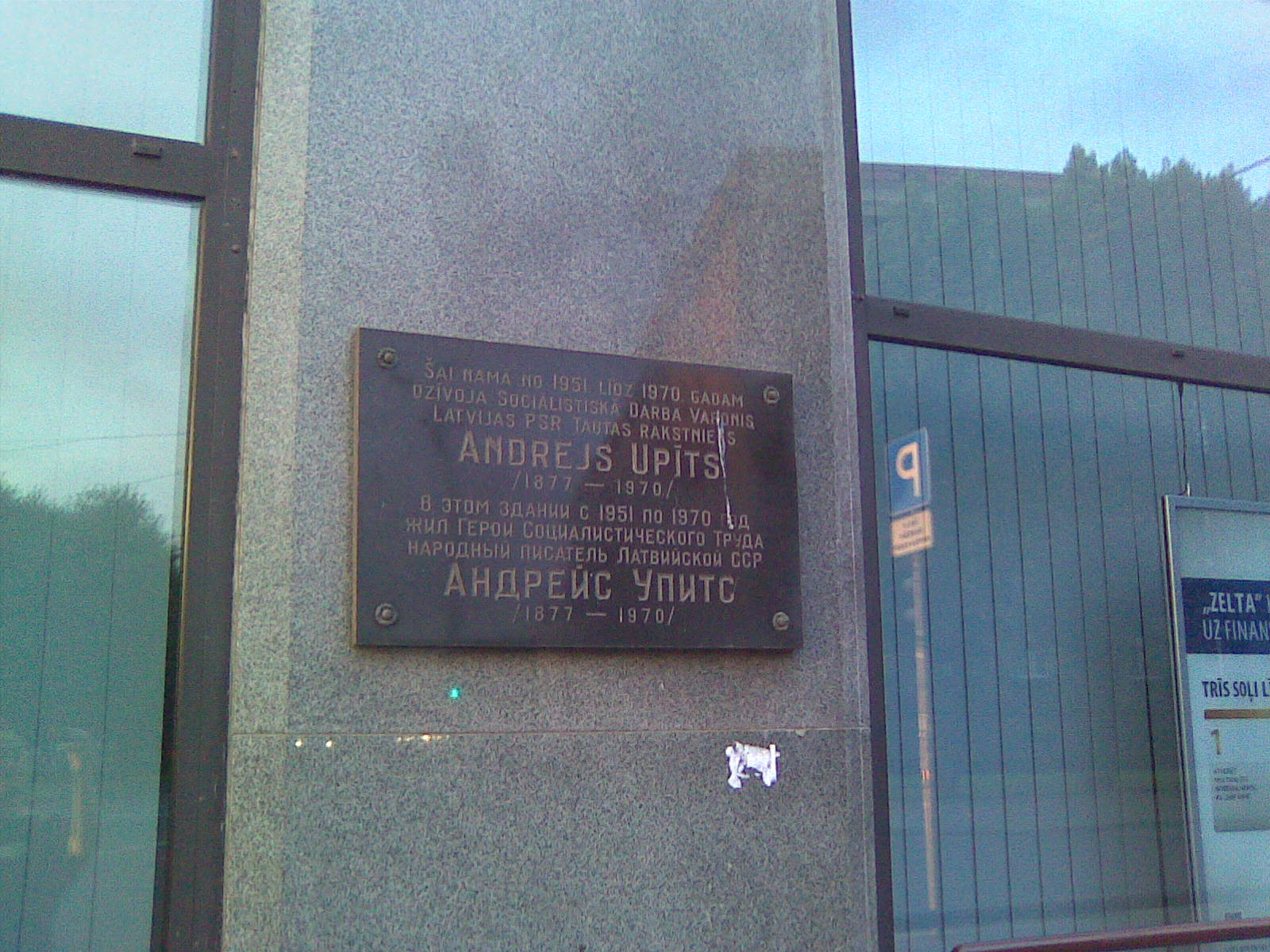
A plaque commemorating Andrejs Upīts.

=== Novels ===
- Jauni avoti (1909)
- Sieviete (1910)
- Zīda tīklā (1912)
- Pēdējais latvietis (1913)
- Zelts (1914)
- Renegāti (1915)
- Ziemeļa vējš (1921)
- Perkona pievārtē (1922)
- Pa varavīksnes tiltu (1926)
- Zem naglota papēža (1928)
- Jāņa Robežnieka nāve (1932)
- Vecās ēnas (1934)
- Zaļā zeme (1945)
- Plaisa mākoņos (1951)

=== Plays ===
- Dzimumdienas rītā (1905)
- Balss un atbalss / triloģija (1911)
- Žanna d'Arka (1930)
- Spartaks (1943)
- Ziņģu Ješkas uzvara (1933)
- Apburtais loks (1929)
- Mirabo (1926)
- Kaijas lidojums (1925)
- Peldētāja Zuzanna (1922)

=== Poetry ===
- Mazas drāmas (1911)

=== Prose ===
- Jauni avoti (1909)
- Sieviete (1910)
- Zīda tīklā (1912)
- Pēdējais latvietis (1913)
- Ziemeļa vējš (1921)
- Zelts (1921)
- Pērkona pievārtē (1922)
- Renegāti (1922)
- Pa varavīksnes tiltu (1926)
- Zem naglota papēža (1928)
- Jāņa Robežnieka pārnākšana (1932)
- Jāņa Robežnieka nāve (1933)
- Vecas ēnas (1934)
- Smaidoša lapa (1937)
- Laikmetu griežos (1937 1940)
- Māsas Ģertrūdes noslēpums (1939)
- Zaļā zeme (1945)
- Plaisa mākoņos (1951)

=== Short stories ===
- Mazas komēdijas (1-2) (1909 1910)
- Nemiers (1912)
- Vēju kauja (1920)
- Aiz paradīzes vārtiem (1922)
- Kailā dzīvība (1926)
- Stāsti par mācītājiem (1930)
- Sūnu ciema zēni / garstāsts jaunatnei (1940)
- Noveles (1943)

== Partial bibliography ==
- McCall's: August 1964; Vol. XCI, No. 11 (featuring The Young Crane by Andrejs Upīts and Illustrated by Maurice Sendak)
- Outside Paradise and Other Stories (1970)
- Cause and effect (Soviet short stories) (1977)
- Selected stories (1978)
- Problems of Socialist Realism in Literature
- Gold (Vagabond Voices, 2024)
