= Zalve Parish =

Parish of Latvia

- parish of Latvia
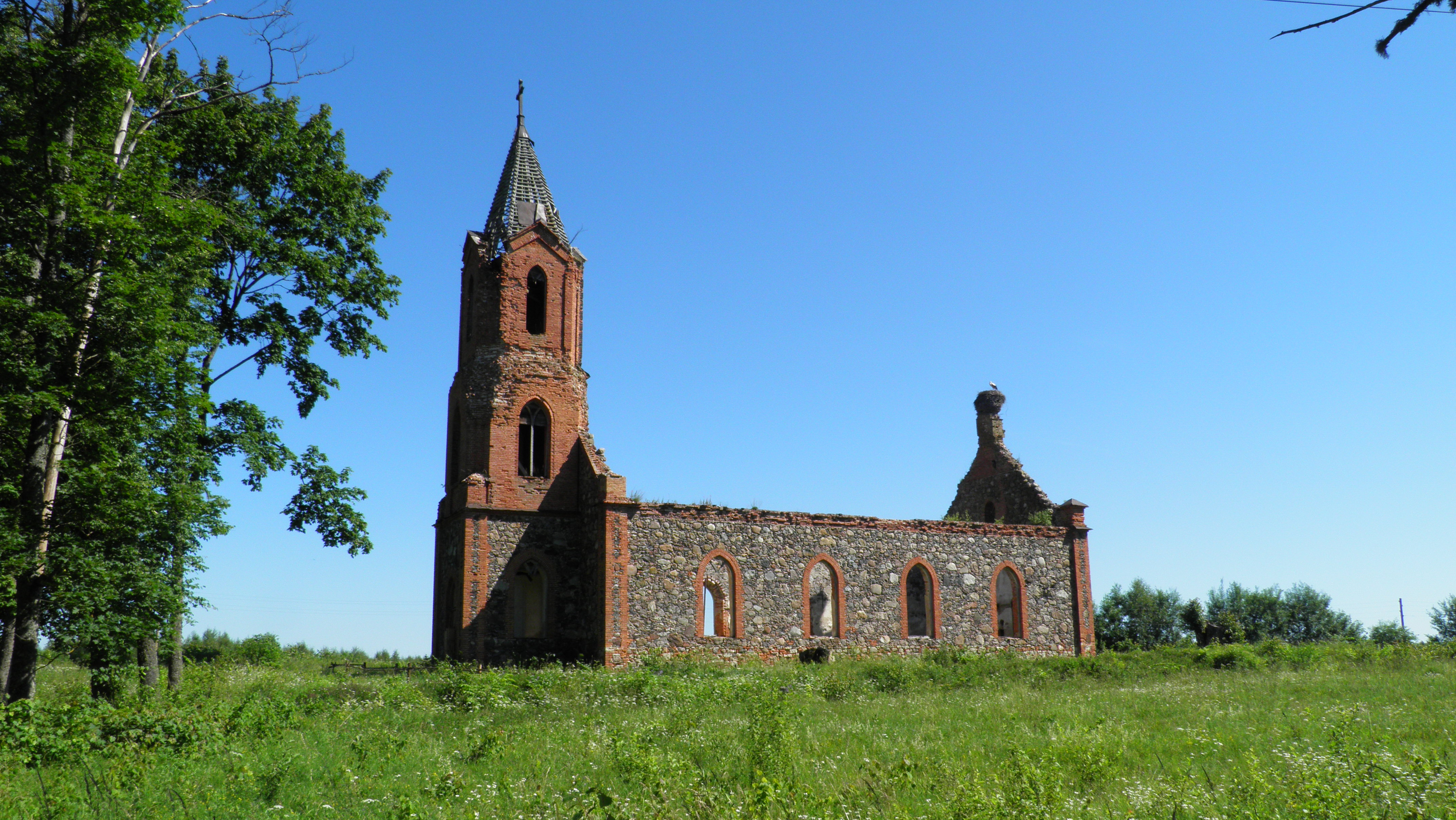

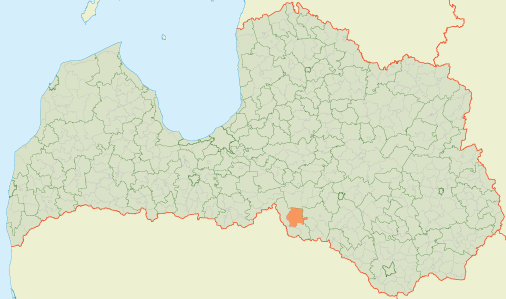
- 56°20′19″N 25°11′51″E
- Country: Latvia

Area
  - Total: 210.23 km^{2} (81.17 sq mi)
  - Land: 207.59 km^{2} (80.15 sq mi)
  - Water: 2.64 km^{2} (1.02 sq mi)

Population (1 January 2025)
  - Total: 501
  - Density: 2.41/km^{2} (6.25/sq mi)

Zalve Parish (Latvian: Zalves pagasts) is an administrative unit of Aizkraukle Municipality in the Selonia region of Latvia.

== Towns, villages and settlements of Zalve Parish ==
- Cīruļkalns
- Kalnamuiža
- Pētermuiža
- Salas
- Sierotava
- Smaltāni
- Sproģi
- Suseja
- Vērtūži
- Zalve
- Zvanītāji
- Kalna Pālēni
