= Skrīveri =

Village in Latvia

- Village
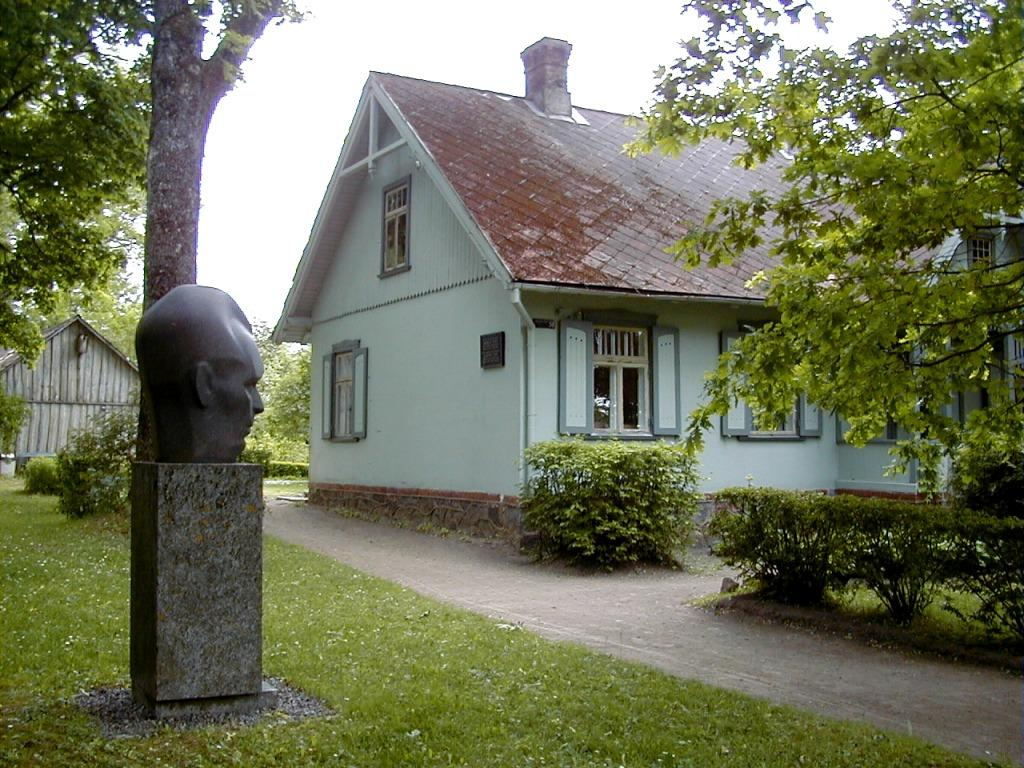
- Birthplace and museum of Andrejs Upīts in Skrīveri

- Skrīveri location in Latvia
- Coordinates: 56°38′48″N 25°7′20″E
- Country: Latvia
- Municipality: Aizkraukle
- Parish: Skrīveri
- Founded: 1882

Population (2022)
  - Total: 2,424
- Post code: LV-5125
- Climate: Dfb

Skrīveri (German: Römerhof) is a village in the Skrīveri Parish of Aizkraukle Municipality in the Vidzeme region of Latvia, near the Riga–Daugavpils Railway. Skrīveri had 2,424 residents in 2022.

The village is the location of the parish council, the Andrejs Upītis Skrīveri Secondary School, music and art school, kindergarten "Sprīdītis", Latvijas Pasts office, Catholic church, culture house (cultural center), and a library. South of Skrīveri, near the highway A6 is Skrīveri Dendrological Park, Aizkraukle Hillfort and Skrīveri Agricultural Research Institute.

== History ==
The settlement is located on the land of the former Römerhof estate, which Gotthard Kettler had given to a certain Stephan Römer. This is how the name Römershof manor came about. In 1634 property became part of Koknese Manor.

The Latvian name Skrīveri is derived from the Swedish: skreivet (to write) since in 1634 the property became possession of the Swedish notary Johann Niemier, who was also referred simply as the “scribe”.

When the Römershof train station was opened in 1882 village Skrīveri began to develop.

Since 1892 at the latest, the estate has belonged to the Livonian dendrologist Maximilian (Max) von Sivers (1857–1919), who together with the garden architect Walter von Engelhardt founded a tree nursery and an Arboretum. During the 1905 Russian Revolution the Manor house was destroyed.

In 1925, Skrīveri was granted village (selsoviet) status, and in 1958 - an urban-type settlement status which was lost in 1990.

In 1956, Skrīveri Food Factory was founded, which started producing the favorite candy "Gotiņa".

== Geography ==
In the municipality of Skrīveri there is Daugava tributary Maizīte and tributary Brasla (Dīvaja) which also includes a 10 hectare reservoir. Along the right bank of the river, there is a 3.6 km long tourist trail.

=== Climate ===
Skrīveri has a humid continental climate (Köppen Dfb).

Climate data for Skrīveri (1991-2020 normals, extremes 1940-present)
| Month | Jan | Feb | Mar | Apr | May | Jun | Jul | Aug | Sep | Oct | Nov | Dec | Year |
|---|---|---|---|---|---|---|---|---|---|---|---|---|---|
| Record high °C (°F) | 10.6 (51.1) | 13.5 (56.3) | 19.8 (67.6) | 28.4 (83.1) | 29.9 (85.8) | 32.2 (90.0) | 35.3 (95.5) | 33.8 (92.8) | 31.6 (88.9) | 22.2 (72.0) | 16.2 (61.2) | 10.7 (51.3) | 35.3 (95.5) |
| Mean daily maximum °C (°F) | −1.3 (29.7) | −0.7 (30.7) | 4.1 (39.4) | 12.0 (53.6) | 17.8 (64.0) | 21.1 (70.0) | 23.6 (74.5) | 22.4 (72.3) | 17.0 (62.6) | 9.8 (49.6) | 3.8 (38.8) | 0.2 (32.4) | 10.8 (51.5) |
| Daily mean °C (°F) | −3.6 (25.5) | −3.6 (25.5) | 0.2 (32.4) | 6.7 (44.1) | 12.1 (53.8) | 15.6 (60.1) | 18.0 (64.4) | 16.9 (62.4) | 12.0 (53.6) | 6.3 (43.3) | 1.7 (35.1) | −1.8 (28.8) | 6.7 (44.1) |
| Mean daily minimum °C (°F) | −6.3 (20.7) | −6.7 (19.9) | −3.6 (25.5) | 1.6 (34.9) | 5.9 (42.6) | 9.9 (49.8) | 12.5 (54.5) | 11.6 (52.9) | 7.6 (45.7) | 3.1 (37.6) | −0.5 (31.1) | −4.0 (24.8) | 2.6 (36.7) |
| Record low °C (°F) | −37.3 (−35.1) | −38.4 (−37.1) | −30.7 (−23.3) | −18.0 (−0.4) | −4.9 (23.2) | −2.2 (28.0) | 3.5 (38.3) | −0.6 (30.9) | −4.6 (23.7) | −12.5 (9.5) | −23.6 (−10.5) | −32.8 (−27.0) | −38.4 (−37.1) |
| Average precipitation mm (inches) | 55.8 (2.20) | 42.3 (1.67) | 41.0 (1.61) | 41.0 (1.61) | 58.9 (2.32) | 77.8 (3.06) | 83.2 (3.28) | 80.4 (3.17) | 61.8 (2.43) | 75.9 (2.99) | 62.0 (2.44) | 52.9 (2.08) | 733 (28.86) |
| Average precipitation days (≥ 1 mm) | 13 | 10 | 10 | 8 | 8 | 10 | 11 | 11 | 10 | 12 | 12 | 13 | 128 |
| Average relative humidity (%) | 88.4 | 85.8 | 77.5 | 69.1 | 68.0 | 72.6 | 75.2 | 77.9 | 82.7 | 86.9 | 90.2 | 90.4 | 80.4 |
Source 1: LVĢMC
Source 2: NOAA (precipitation days, humidity 1991-2020)

== Demographics ==
Within existing limits, according to CSB data.

Historical population

| Year | Pop. | ±% |
|---|---|---|
| 1909 | 600 | — |
| 1935 | 861 | +43.5% |
| 1959 | 2,208 | +156.4% |
| 1967 | 2,000 | −9.4% |
| 1979 | 2,044 | +2.2% |

| Year | Pop. | ±% |
|---|---|---|
| 1989 | 3,188 | +56.0% |
| 2000 | 2,681 | −15.9% |
| 2011 | 2,516 | −6.2% |
| 2021 | 2,285 | −9.2% |

Source: Central Statistical Bureau of Latvia

== People ==
- Walter von Engelhardt
- Maximilian (Max) von Sivers
- Andrejs Upīts

== See also ==
- Skrīveri Station
