= Bebri Parish =

Parish of Latvia

- parish of Latvia
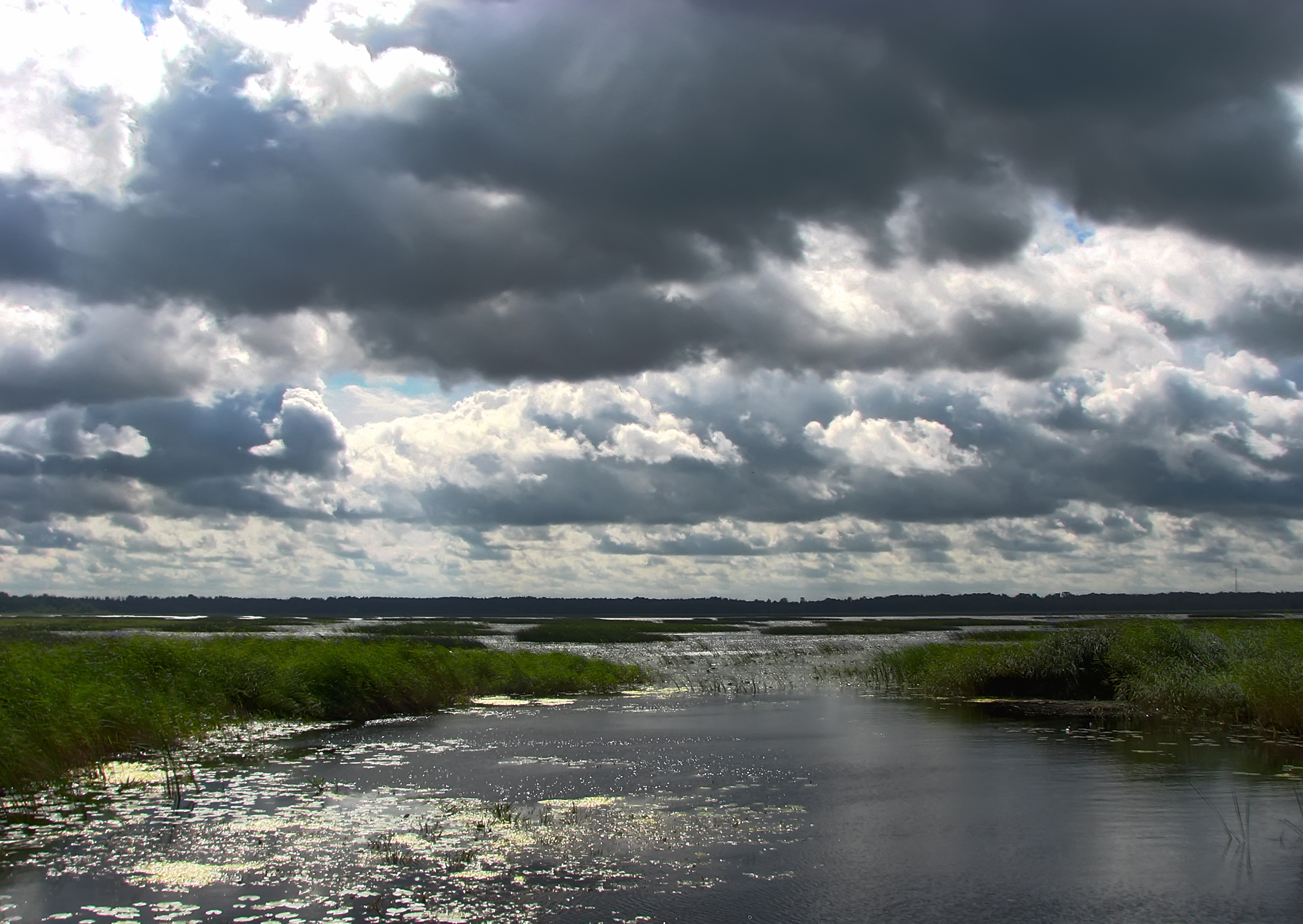

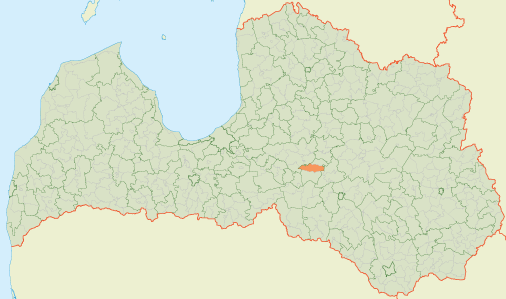
- 56°44′07″N 25°27′14″E
- Country: Latvia

Area
  - Total: 120.33 km^{2} (46.46 sq mi)
  - Land: 118.06 km^{2} (45.58 sq mi)
  - Water: 2.27 km^{2} (0.88 sq mi)

Population (1 January 2024)
  - Total: 1,031
  - Density: 8.6/km^{2} (22/sq mi)

Bebri Parish (Latvian: Bebru pagasts) is an administrative unit of Aizkraukle Municipality in the Vidzeme region of Latvia.

== Towns, villages and settlements of Bebri Parish ==
- Blankas
- Gaidupes
- Jaunbebri
- Ozoli
- Tupiešēni
- Vecbebri
- Vēži
- Zutēni
