= Irši Parish =

Parish of Latvia

- parish of Latvia
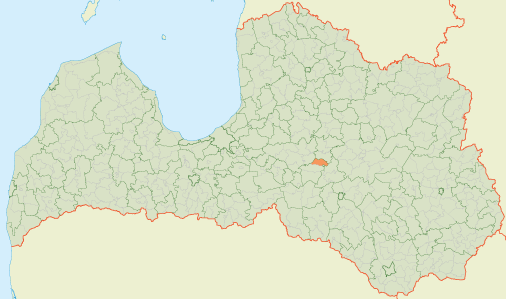
- 56°46′44″N 25°34′08″E
- Country: Latvia

Area
  - Total: 69.76 km^{2} (26.93 sq mi)
  - Land: 68.11 km^{2} (26.30 sq mi)
  - Water: 1.65 km^{2} (0.64 sq mi)

Population (1 January 2026)
  - Total: 441
  - Density: 6.47/km^{2} (16.8/sq mi)

Irši Parish (Latvian: Iršu pagasts) is an administrative unit of Aizkraukle Municipality in the Vidzeme region of Latvia.

== Towns, villages and settlements of Irši parish ==
- Irši
