= Aizkraukle district =

District of Latvia

Coordinates: 56°39′N 25°15′E

Aizkraukle district Aizkraukles rajons
- District
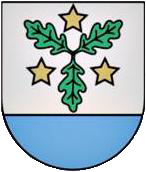
- Coat of arms

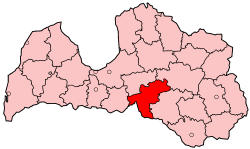
- Country: Latvia

Area
  - Total: 2,566.8 km^{2} (991.0 sq mi)

Population
  - Total: 39,971
  - Density: 15.572/km^{2} (40.332/sq mi)
- Website: aizkrauklesrajons.lv

Aizkraukle district (Latvian: Aizkraukles rajons, [aizkraukles rajuons]) was an administrative division of Latvia from 1967 to 2009. It was located in Vidzeme, and Selonia regions, in the country's centre.

Districts were introduced during the Soviet occupation of Latvia and were eliminated during the administrative-territorial reform in 2009.
