= Demographics of Latvia =

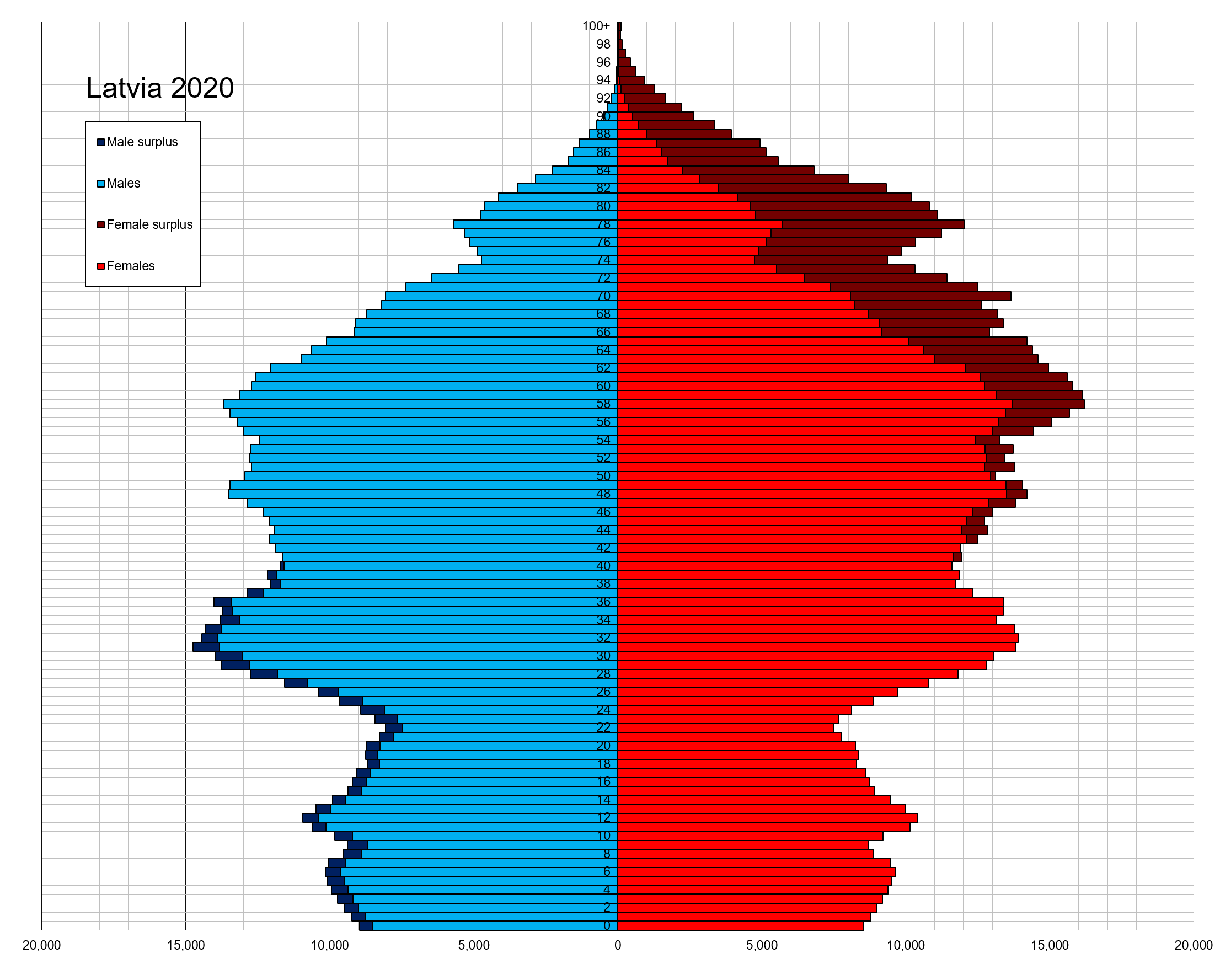
- Latvia population pyramid in 2020
- Population: ▼1,861,900 (1 June 2024)
- Growth rate: ▼ −1.1% (2023)
- Birth rate: 8.5 births/1,000 population (2022)
- Death rate: 16.4 deaths/1,000 population (2022)
- Life expectancy: 76.1 years (2023)
  - male: 71.7 years (2023)
  - female: 80.2 years (2023)
- Fertility rate: 1.6 children born/woman (2023)
- Infant mortality: 2.8 deaths/1,000 live births (2023)
- Net migration rate: 11.7 migrant(s)/1,000 population (2022)
- Immigrant share: 11.8% (2024)

Sex ratio
- Total: 0.86 male(s)/female (2022)
- At birth: 1.06 male(s)/female (2022)
- Under 15: 1.06 male(s)/female (2022)
- 15–64 years: 0.97 male(s)/female (2022)
- 65 and over: 0.50 male(s)/female (2022)

Nationality
- Nationality: noun: Latvian(s) adjective: Latvian
- Major ethnic: Latvians (62,4%) (2023)
- Minor ethnic: Russians (23.7%), Belarusians (3.0%), Ukrainians (3.0%) (2023)

Language
- Official: Latvian
- Spoken: Latvian (62.0%), Russian (34.6%) (2022)

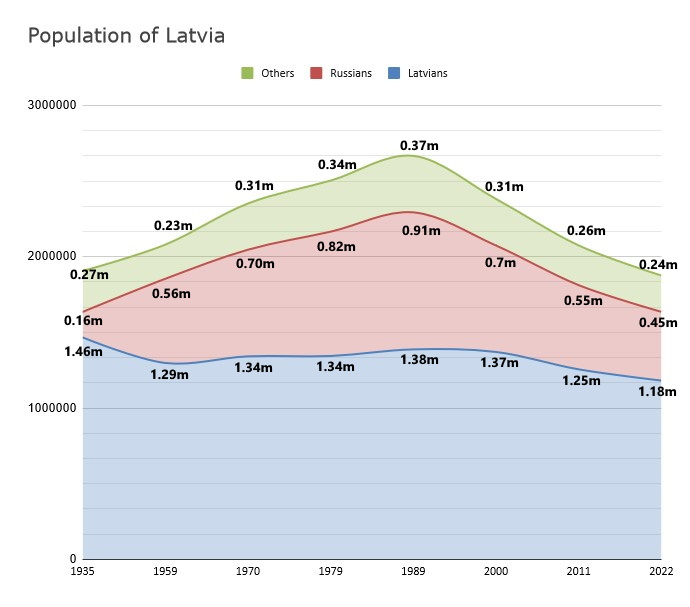
Population of Latvia (in millions) from 1935 to 2022

As of 1 May 2024, Latvia had a total population of 1,862,700. Demographic features of the population of the historical territory of Latvia include population density, ethnic background, education level, health of the populace, economic status, religious affiliations and other aspects of the population.

Currently Latvia's population is in significant decline, a trend that has persisted since 1990 due to low birth rates, high death rates, and significant emigration, leading to an aging population and one of the fastest depopulation rates globally.

== History ==
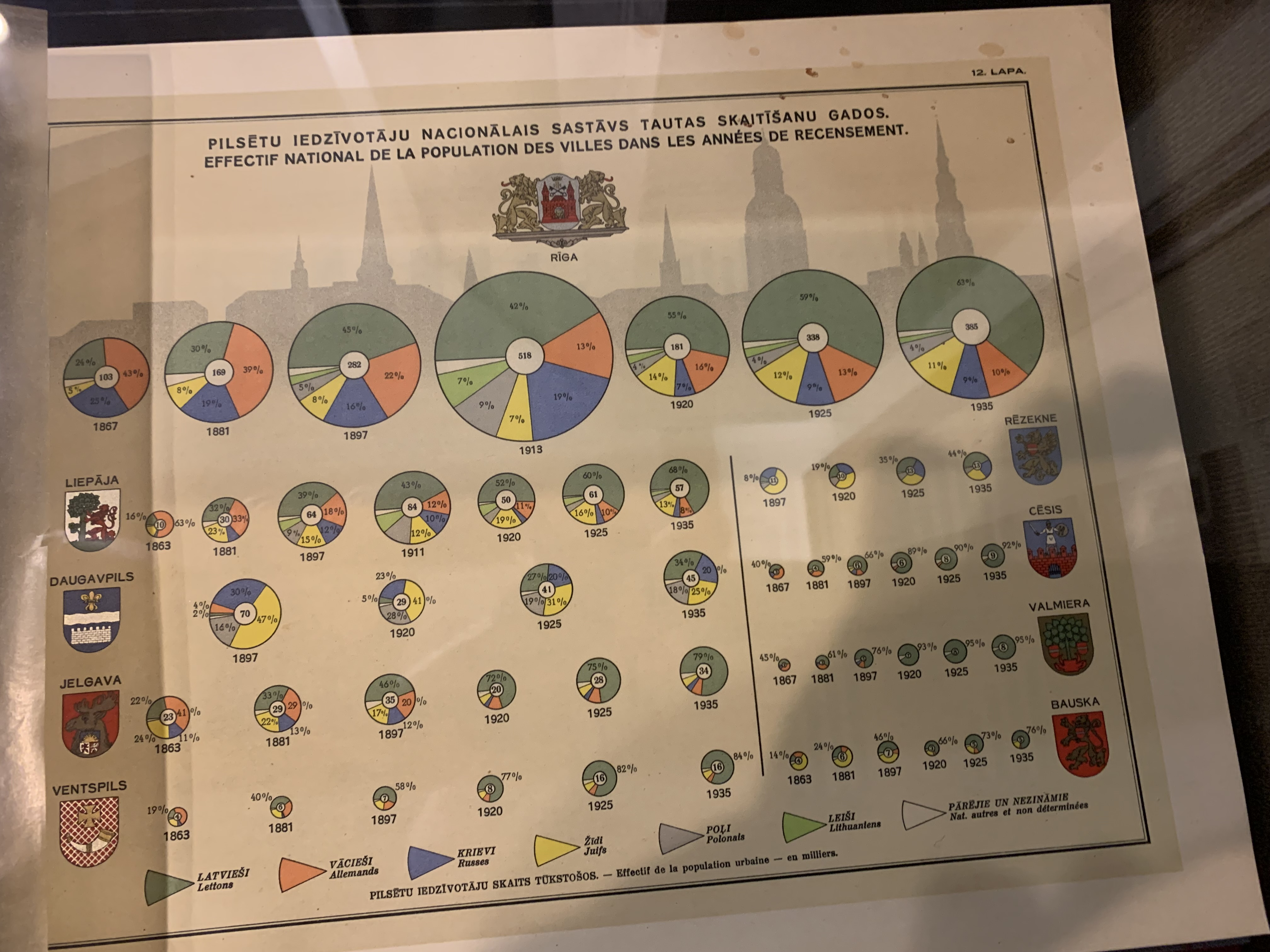
Ethnic Composition of Latvia 1863–1935

Latvia was settled by Baltic tribes some three millennia ago. The territories along the eastern Baltic first came under foreign domination at the beginning of the 13th century, with the formal establishment of Riga in 1201 under the German Teutonic Knights.

Latvia, in whole or in part, remained under foreign rule for the next eight centuries, finding itself at the crossroads of all the regional superpowers of their day, including Denmark (the Danes held on lands around the Gulf of Riga), Sweden, and Russia, with southern (Courland) Latvia being at one time a vassal to Poland-Lithuania as well as Latgale falling directly under Poland-Lithuania rule. Through all this time, Latvia remained largely under Baltic German hegemony, with Baltic Germans comprising the largest land-owners, a situation which did not change until Latvia's independence.

Historically, Latvia has had significant German, Russian, Jewish, Polish, Belarusian and Lithuanian minorities. The majority (roughly two thirds) of Latvians, under Swedish influences, adopted Lutheranism, while the minority (the remaining third) of Latvians under Poland-Lithuania, Latgale in particular, retained Catholicism. Aglona, in Latgale, has been the site of annual Catholic pilgrimage for centuries, even through to today. During the Second World War the Jewish population was largely decimated by Nazi Germany as part of the holocaust.

Recently introduced immigration law in Latvia provides framework for immigration through investment in various financial areas or real estate. In 2012, solely 2,435 applications for residence permit by investment in real estate were received by Office of Citizenship and Migration Affairs. The main immigrant countries are Russia, Belarus, Ukraine and Lithuania (Lithuania is in the European Union, thus no investment is needed). Moreover, Latvia receives residence permit applications from people of nationalities such as Afghans, Chinese, Libyans and people from various other distant countries.

Historical population
Year	Pop.	±% p.a.
1863	1,240,988	—
1897	1,929,387	+1.31%
1914	2,552,000	+1.66%
1920	1,596,131	−7.52%
1925	1,844,805	+2.94%
1930	1,900,045	+0.59%
1935	1,950,936	+0.53%
1943	1,760,162	−1.28%
1950	1,943,146	+1.42%
1959	2,079,948	+0.76%
1970	2,351,903	+1.12%
1979	2,502,816	+0.69%
1989	2,666,567	+0.64%
2000	2,377,383	−1.04%
2011	2,070,371	−1.25%
2021	1,893,223	−0.89%
2026	1,845,096	−0.51%

Over 130,000 persons have been naturalized as Latvian citizens since 1995 and 182,375 persons, as of 2022, live in Latvia with non-citizen's passports. Large numbers of Russians, as well as some Ukrainians and Belarusians remained in Latvia after the fall of the Soviet Union.

According to the provisional results of the Population and Housing Census 2011, the total population of Latvia on 1 March 2011 was 2,067,887. Since the previous census in 2000 the country's population decreased by 309,000 or 13%. Based on the Population and Housing Census 2021, the total population of Latvia on 1 January 2021 was 1,893,223. Since the previous census in 2011 the country's population decreased by 174,664 or 8.5%. The proportion of ethnic Latvians increased to 62.7% of the population. Livonians are the other indigenous ethnic group, with about 250 of them remaining. Latgalians are a distinctive subgroup of Latvians inhabiting or coming from Eastern Latvia.

According to rankings provided by the United States Census Bureau—International Data Base (IDB)—Country Rankings, Latvia is estimated to have a population of 1,249,812 in the year 2050.

View source data.
View source data.
View source data.
View source data.

== Population ==
=== Age structure ===
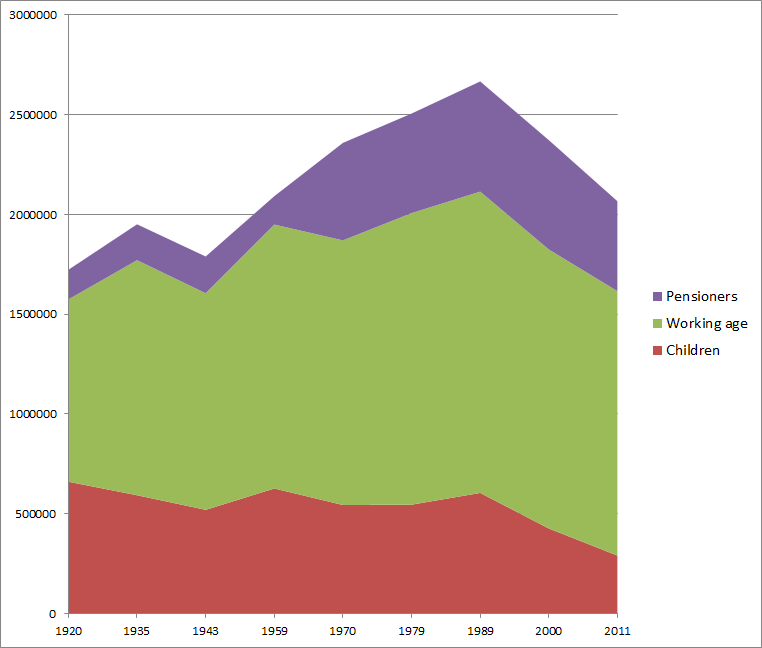
Approximate demographic evolution in Latvia, 1920–2011. NB. the amount of time between each year in the diagramme is not the same which gives a somewhat garbled image of the evolution.

Census year	Children	Working age	Pensioners
1897	41.0	52.8	6.2
1920	38.3	52.9	8.6
1935	30.4	60.3	9.2
1943	29.1	60.6	10.3
1959	30.0	63.2	6.8
1970	23.1	56.2	20.7
1979	21.8	58.3	19.9
1989	22.7	56.6	20.7
2000	18.0	58.9	23.1
2011	14.1	64.1	21.8
2021	16.1	61.9	22.1

View source data.

== Vital statistics ==
Source: Central Statistical Bureau of Latvia

Notable events in Latvian demographics:

- 1940-1945 – World War II
- 1991 – Dissolution of the Soviet Union

	Average population	Live births	Deaths	Natural change	Crude birth rate (per 1000)	Crude death rate (per 1000)	Natural change (per 1000)	Crude migration change (per 1000)	Total fertility rate	Infant mortality rate (per 1000 births)	Life expectancy at birth (males)	Life expectancy at birth (females)
1920	1,727,000	29,434	33,891	−4,457	17.0	19.6	−2.5	73.7		128.4		
1921	1,850,000	36,420	25,331	11,089	19.7	13.7	5.9	11.9		93.2		
1922	1,883,000	41,146	27,553	13,593	21.9	14.6	7.2	6.6		90.8		
1923	1,909,000	41,796	26,080	15,716	21.9	13.7	−41.7	8.2		88.4		
1924	1,845,000	41,172	28,399	12,773	22.3	15.4	6.9	−0.4		100.8	50.7	56.9
1925	1,857,000	41,314	27,683	13,631	22.3	14.9	7.3	0.2		107.2		
1926	1,871,000	41,073	27,557	13,516	22.0	14.7	7.2	−0.8		87.9		
1927	1,883,000	41,610	28,941	12,669	22.1	15.4	6.7	−0.3		95.7		
1928	1,895,000	39,126	27,299	11,827	20.7	14.4	6.2	−3.6		96.3		
1929	1,900,000	35,673	28,512	7,161	18.8	15.0	3.7	1.6		106.7		
1930	1,910,000	37,835	27,110	10,725	19.8	14.2	5.6	−0.4		90.0		
1931	1,920,000	36,972	26,891	10,081	19.3	14.0	5.2	0.5		86.3		
1932	1,931,000	37,366	26,342	11,024	19.4	13.6	5.7	−1.6		89.3		
1933	1,939,000	34,576	26,319	8,257	17.8	13.6	4.2	−0.1		76.4		
1934	1,947,000	33,383	27,065	6,318	17.2	13.9	3.2	−0.1		95.1	55.1	60.6
1935	1,953,000	34,419	27,660	6,759	17.6	14.2	3.4	0.7		78.9	55.0	61.0
1936	1,961,000	35,468	27,646	7,822	18.1	14.1	3.9	−0.3		80.1		
1937	1,968,000	34,863	28,083	6,780	17.7	14.3	3.4	1.7		85.0		
1938	1,978,000	36,386	26,703	9,683	18.4	13.5	4.9	6.2		68.1		
1939	2,000,000	36,932	27,827	9,105	18.5	13.9	4.6	−34.6		70.2		
1940	1,940,000	37,493	30,355	7,138	19.3	15.7	3.6	−99.0		73.2		
1941	1,755,000	36,295	30,434	5,861	20.7	17.3	3.4	−6.2		81.7		
1942	1,750,000	36,370	29,940	6,430	20.7	17.1	3.6	2.1		81.1		
1943	1,760,000	35,915	29,904	6,011	20.4	16.9	3.5			93.4		
1944									2.30			
1945		26,217	32,230	−6,013						111.1		
1946	1,553,577	30,544	32,266	−1,722	18.7	19.7	−1.0	106.0		93.9		
1947	1,716,773	34,832	32,435	2,397	19.5	18.2	1.3	80.0		108.7		
1948	1,856,419	35,402	26,500	8,902	18.9	14.2	4.7	11.7		79.3		
1949	1,886,792	35,671	25,640	10,031	18.9	13.6	5.3	−6.7		83.3		
1950	1,884,077	33,137	24,250	8,887	17.6	12.9	4.7	−1.6		70.0		
1951	1,889,974	32,764	23,898	8,866	17.3	12.6	4.7	−0.1		69.6		
1952	1,898,577	32,278	22,680	9,598	16.9	11.9	5.0	2.5		52.9		
1953	1,912,837	30,986	22,761	8,225	16.1	11.8	4.3	9.4		46.8		
1954	1,939,138	33,202	22,500	10,702	17.0	11.5	5.5	8.6		45.9		
1955	1,966,567	32,968	21,330	11,638	16.6	10.8	5.8	8.8		42.0		
1956	1,995,354	32,590	20,339	12,251	16.1	10.1	6.0	16.9		33.9		
1957	2,040,978	33,714	21,087	12,627	16.4	10.3	6.1	6.3		32.3		
1958	2,066,368	35,068	20,910	14,158	16.9	10.1	6.8	−0.2		29.5	65.2	72.4
1959	2,079,948	35,028	22,601	12,427	16.7	10.8	5.9	5.7		30.8		
1960	2,104,128	35,468	21,314	14,154	16.7	10.0	6.7	9.3	1.99	27.0		
1961	2,137,830	35,993	21,759	14,234	16.7	10.1	6.6	7.3	2.01	24.1	66.1	73.5
1962	2,167,531	35,061	23,592	11,469	16.1	10.8	5.3	7.7	1.91	24.2		
1963	2,195,640	33,843	22,703	11,140	15.3	10.3	5.0	8.9	1.85	25.9	67.0	74.0
1964	2,226,198	33,053	21,165	11,888	14.8	9.4	5.4	7.6	1.79	22.0		
1965	2,255,048	31,212	22,780	8,432	13.8	10.1	3.7	5.9	1.74	18.9	66.6	74.4
1966	2,276,789	31,974	23,350	8,624	14.0	10.2	3.8	1.8	1.76	17.0		
1967	2,289,645	32,232	24,362	7,870	14.0	10.6	3.4	6.7	1.80	17.3		
1968	2,312,795	32,693	25,104	7,589	14.1	10.8	3.3	6.1	1.83	18.9		
1969	2,334,443	32,915	26,229	6,686	14.0	11.2	2.8	4.7	1.88	17.7	65.5	74.2
1970	2,351,903	34,333	26,546	7,787	14.6	11.3	3.3	2.9	2.01	17.7	66.0	74.4
1971	2,366,424	35,239	26,275	8,964	14.8	11.1	3.7	4.7	2.05	15.9	65.4	74.6
1972	2,386,353	35,007	27,296	7,711	14.6	11.4	3.2	4.6	2.03	16.0	65.0	75.0
1973	2,404,995	34,008	28,139	5,869	14.1	11.6	2.5	6.5	1.96	15.8	65.2	74.7
1974	2,426,642	34,920	28,143	6,777	14.3	11.5	2.8	5.9	1.99	18.4		
1975	2,447,730	34,810	30,042	4,768	14.2	12.2	2.0	4.9	1.96	20.3	64.2	74.3
1976	2,464,529	34,644	30,373	4,271	14.0	12.3	1.7	3.5	1.93	20.1	64.4	74.3
1977	2,477,449	34,240	30,869	3,371	13.8	12.4	1.4	4.8	1.88	18.3	64.5	74.2
1978	2,492,697	34,258	31,261	2,997	13.7	12.5	1.2	3.0	1.86	18.1	63.7	73.9
1979	2,503,145	34,683	32,162	2,521	13.8	12.8	1.0	1.2	1.86	18.3	63.6	73.9
1980	2,508,761	35,534	32,100	3,434	14.1	12.8	1.3	1.0	1.88	15.3	63.6	74.2
1981	2,514,640	35,732	32,090	3,642	14.2	12.7	1.5	2.3	1.88	16.0	63.9	74.4
1982	2,524,202	37,477	31,234	6,243	14.8	12.3	2.5	2.9	1.97	13.9	64.0	74.5
1983	2,537,958	40,572	32,330	8,242	15.9	12.7	3.2	3.1	2.12	15.9	63.9	74.5
1984	2,554,063	40,847	33,406	7,441	15.9	13.0	2.9	3.4	2.14	12.9	64.4	74.2
1985	2,570,030	39,751	34,166	5,585	15.4	13.2	2.2	4.7	2.08	13.0	65.5	74.5
1986	2,587,716	41,960	31,328	10,632	16.1	12.0	4.1	5.3	2.21	12.8	66.3	75.0
1987	2,612,068	42,135	32,150	9,985	16.0	12.2	3.8	7.3	2.21	11.3		
1988	2,641,097	41,275	32,421	8,854	15.6	12.2	3.4	5.9	2.16	11.0	66.3	75.1
1989	2,665,770	38,922	32,584	6,338	14.6	12.2	2.4	−1.5	2.04	11.3	65.3	75.2
1990	2,668,140	37,918	34,812	3,106	14.2	13.1	1.1	−4.8	2.00	13.7	64.2	74.6
1991	2,658,161	34,633	34,749	−116	13.1	13.1	0.0	−5.7	1.86	15.7	63.8	74.8
1992	2,643,000	31,569	35,420	−3,851	12.1	13.5	−1.4	−20.3	1.74	17.6	63.3	74.8
1993	2,585,675	26,759	39,197	−12,438	10.4	15.3	−4.9	−12.4	1.52	16.2	61.6	73.8
1994	2,540,904	24,256	41,757	−17,501	9.6	16.6	−7.0	−8.9	1.41	15.7	60.7	72.9
1995	2,500,580	21,595	38,931	−17,336	8.7	15.7	−7.0	−5.4	1.27	18.8	60.8	73.1
1996	2,469,531	19,782	34,320	−14,538	8.1	14.0	−5.9	−4.1	1.18	15.9	63.9	75.6
1997	2,444,912	18,830	33,533	−14,703	7.7	13.8	−6.1	−3.8	1.13	15.3	64.2	75.9
1998	2,420,789	18,410	34,200	−15,790	7.6	14.2	−6.6	−2.3	1.12	15.0	64.1	75.5
1999	2,399,248	19,396	32,844	−13,448	8.1	13.7	−5.6	−1.7	1.18	11.3	64.9	76.2
2000	2,381,715	20,302	32,205	−11,903	8.6	13.6	−5.0	−6.9	1.25	10.3	64.6	75.8
2001	2,353,384	19,726	32,991	−13,265	8.4	14.1	−5.7	−8.1	1.22	11.0	64.2	75.5
2002	2,320,956	20,127	32,498	−12,371	8.7	14.1	−5.4	−3.9	1.25	9.8	64.4	75.9
2003	2,299,390	21,151	32,437	−11,286	9.2	14.2	−5.0	−4.9	1.32	9.4	65.4	75.7
2004	2,276,520	20,551	32,024	−11,473	9.1	14.2	−5.1	−6.7	1.29	9.3	65.5	76.1
2005	2,249,724	21,879	32,777	−10,898	9.8	14.6	−4.8	−4.9	1.39	7.7	64.9	76.3
2006	2,227,874	22,871	33,098	−10,227	10.3	14.9	−4.6	−3.9	1.46	7.4	65.0	76.1
2007	2,208,840	23,958	33,042	−9,084	10.9	15.0	−4.1	−3.6	1.54	8.5	65.3	76.2
2008	2,191,810	24,397	31,006	−6,609	11.2	14.2	−3.0	−10.2	1.58	6.6	66.5	77.4
2009	2,162,834	22,044	29,897	−7,853	10.3	14.0	−3.7	−15.9	1.46	7.6	67.5	77.6
2010	2,120,504	19,781	30,040	−10,259	9.4	14.3	−4.9	−16.7	1.36	5.6	67.9	77.9
2011	2,074,605	18,825	28,540	−9,715	9.1	13.9	−4.8	−9.6	1.33	6.6	68.6	78.5
2012	2,044,813	19,897	29,025	−9,128	9.8	14.3	−4.5	−5.8	1.44	6.3	65.9	78.7
2013	2,023,825	20,596	28,691	−8,095	10.2	14.3	−4.1	−6.9	1.52	4.4	69.3	78.8
2014	2,001,468	21,746	28,466	−6,720	10.9	14.3	−3.4	−4.3	1.65	3.8	69.1	79.3
2015	1,986,096	21,979	28,478	−6,499	11.1	14.4	−3.3	−5.3	1.70	4.1	69.7	79.3
2016	1,968,957	21,968	28,580	−6,612	11.2	14.6	−3.4	−6.2	1.74	3.7	69.8	79.4
2017	1,950,116	20,828	28,757	−7,929	10.7	14.8	−4.1	−4.0	1.69	4.1	69.8	79.6
2018	1,934,379	19,314	28,820	−9,506	10.0	15.0	−5.0	−2.4	1.60	3.2	70.0	79.6
2019	1,919,968	18,786	27,719	−8,933	9.8	14.5	−4.7	−1.7	1.61	3.4	70.8	79.9
2020	1,907,675	17,552	28,854	−11,302	9.2	15.2	−5.9	−1.7	1.55	3.5	70.4	79.5
2021	1,893,223	17,420	34,600	−17,180	9.2	18.4	−9.1	−0.1	1.57	2.7	68.2	77.9
2022	1,875,757	15,954	30,731	−14,777	8.5	16.4	−7.9	11.8	1.47		69.4	79.3
2023	1,895,239	14,490	28,031	−13,541	7.7	14.9	−7.2	2.3	1.34		70.4	80.4
2024	1,878,575	12,887	26,661	–13,774	6.9	14.3	–7.4	–3.0	1.23		71.3	81.1
2025	1,860,565	11,931	26,109	–14,178	6.4	14.1	–7.7	–0.7	1.16			
2026	1,830,000≈	11,450(e)			6.25				1.12			

=== Current vital statistics ===
Period	Live births	Deaths (Only 8 months)	Natural increase (Only 8 months)
January–August 2025	9,038	17,354	−9,389
January–August 2026	8,652	17,212	−9,564
Difference	▼ –386 (–4.27%)	▼ –142 (–0.8%)	▼ –175

View source data.

=== Total fertility rates by planning regions and the capital city ===
2025
Regions	TFR
Kurzeme Planning Region	1.28
Vidzeme Planning Region	1.27
Zemgale Planning Region	1.24
Latvia	1.16
Latgale Planning Region	1.13
Riga Planning Region	1.09
Riga	0.95

=== Structure of the population ===
Population by Sex and Age Group (Census 01.I.2021) (Data refer to usual resident population.):

Age group	Male	Female	Total	%
Total	875 225	1 017 998	1 893 223	100
0–4	50 997	47 398	98 395	5.20
5–9	53 160	49 792	102 952	5.44
10–14	52 031	49 600	101 631	5.37
15–19	46 483	44 082	90 565	4.78
20–24	43 111	39 983	83 094	4.39
25–29	55 036	51 096	106 132	5.61
30–34	70 356	66 019	136 375	7.20
35–39	67 792	64 584	132 376	6.99
40–44	60 966	61 455	122 421	6.47
45–49	63 622	66 825	130 447	6.89
50–54	60 765	67 333	128 098	6.77
55–59	61 409	72 108	133 517	7.05
60–64	58 392	75 130	133 522	7.05
65–69	44 750	66 714	111 464	5.89
70–74	34 143	59 652	93 795	4.95
75–79	23 578	51 380	74 958	3.96
80–84	18 166	47 524	65 690	3.47
85–89	7 544	24 706	32 250	1.70
90–94	2 572	10 412	12 984	0.69
95–99	317	2 050	2 367	0.13
100+	35	155	190	0.01
Age group	Male	Female	Total	Percent
0–14	156 188	146 790	302 978	16.00
15–64	587 932	608 615	1 196 547	63.20
65+	131 105	262 593	393 698	20.80

== Immigration ==
Illegal immigration in Latvia has traditionally been from neighboring countries but now migrants also come from other areas such as Latin America, Southeast Asia and Africa. The Latvian government have sought to work with Russia to stem the problem. In 2009 the US State Department criticized Latvia for its treatment of illegal immigrants.

For an immigrant not to become an illegal resident, a permit is required for a foreign national or a stateless person wishing to reside in the Republic of Latvia for more than 90 days within a 6-month period, thus if the person does not acquire himself a residence permit, he will be considered an illegal immigrant.

=== Latvia migration data, 1990–present ===
Year	Immigration	Emigration	Net Migration
1990	32,285	45,370	−13,085
1991	14,684	29,729	−15,045
1992	6,199	59,673	−53,474
1993	4,114	36,447	−32,333
1994	3,046	25,869	−22,823
1995	2,799	16,512	−13,713
1996	2,747	12,828	−10,081
1997	2,913	12,333	−9,420
1998	3,123	8,874	−5,751
1999	1,813	5,898	−4,085
2000	6,483	22,911	−16,428
2001	5,376	24,539	−19,163
2002	6,642	15,837	−9,195
2003	4,063	15,647	−11,584
2004	4,844	20,167	−15,323
2005	6,691	17,643	−10,952
2006	8,212	17,019	−8,807
2007	7,517	15,463	−7,946
2008	4,678	27,045	−22,367
2009	3,731	38,208	−34,477
2010	4,011	39,651	−35,640
2011	10,234	30,311	−20,077
2012	13,303	25,163	−11,860
2013	8,299	22,561	−14,262
2014	10,365	19,017	−8,652
2015	9,479	20,119	−10,640
2016	8,345	20,574	−12,229
2017	9,916	17,724	−7,808
2018	10,909	15,814	−4,905
2019	11,223	14,583	−3,360
2020	8,840	11,990	−3,150
2021	12,689	12,975	−286
2022	38,708	16,680	22,028
2023	15,269	18,752	-3,123
2024	14,701	18,937	-4,236
2025	13,826	15,117	-1,291

Largest groups of foreign citizens
Rank	Nationality	Population (2019)
1	Russia	42,243
2	(European Union) Lithuania	2,790
3	Ukraine	2,413
4	Belarus	1,630
5	(European Union) Estonia	611
6	(European Union) Germany	304
7	Israel	201
8	Armenia	188
9	(European Union) Poland	176
10	United States	171
11	Kazakhstan	169
12	United Kingdom	151
13	Moldova	134
14	China	128
15	Azerbaijan	118
16	Uzbekistan	115
17	(European Union) Denmark	96
18	Georgia	88
19	(European Union) Sweden	86
20	(European Union) Italy	82

== Ethnic groups ==
Latvia's indigenous population has been ravaged numerous times throughout history. The earliest such event occurred during the conquest of Latvia by Peter the Great in the Great Northern War with Sweden.

In 1897, the first official census in this area indicated that Latvians formed 68.3% of the total population of 1.93 million; Russians accounted for 7.9%, Jews for 7.4%, Germans for 6.2%, and Poles for 3.4%. The remainder were Lithuanians, Estonians, Romani, and various other nationalities.

The demographics shifted greatly in the 20th century due to the world wars, the expulsion of the Baltic Germans, the Holocaust, and occupation by the Soviet Union. By the 1960s, ethnic Latvians had shrunk to a minority in the cities of Latvia, comprising 52% in 1959 and 44% in 1989.

Today, only the Russian minority, which has tripled in numbers since 1935, remains important. The share of ethnic Latvians fell from 75% (1,472,612) in 1935 to 52% (1,387,757) in 1989, after human loss in World War II and human deportation and other repressive measures.

Population of Latvia according to ethnic group 1897–2021
Ethnic group	census 1897		census 1925		census 1935		census 1959		census 1970		census 1979		census 1989		census 2000		census 2011		census 2021	
Ethnic group	Number	%	Number	%	Number	%	Number	%	Number	%	Number	%	Number	%	Number	%	Number	%	Number	%
Latvians	1,318,112	68.3	1,354,126	73.4	1,472,612	75.5	1,297,881	62.0	1,341,805	56.8	1,344,105	53.7	1,387,757	52.0	1,370,703	57.7	1,285,136	62.1	1,187,891	62.7
Russians	152,681	7.9	193,648	10.5	206,499	10.6	556,448	26.6	704,599	29.8	821,464	32.8	905,515	34.0	703,243	29.6	557,119	26.9	463,587	24.5
Ukrainian	—		512	0.03	1,844	0.09	29,440	1.4	53,461	2.3	66,703	2.7	92,101	3.5	63,644	2.7	45,798	2.2	42,282	2.2
Belarusians	79,523	4.1	38,010	2.1	26,867	1.4	61,587	2.9	94,898	4.0	111,505	4.5	119,702	4.5	97,150	4.1	68,202	3.3	58,632	3.1
Poles	65,056	3.4	51,143	2.8	48,949	2.5	59,774	2.9	63,045	2.7	62,690	2.5	60,416	2.3	59,505	2.5	44,772	2.2	37,203	2.0
Lithuanians	26,033	1.3	23,192	1.3	22,913	1.2	32,383	1.6	40,589	1.7	37,818	1.5	34,630	1.3	33,430	1.4	24,479	1.2	21,517	1.1
Roma	—		2,870	0.2	3,839	0.2	4,301	0.2	5,427	0.2	6,134	0.3	7,044	0.3	8,205	0.3	6,489	0.3	4,838	0.3
Jews	142,315	7.4	95,675	5.2	93,479	4.8	36,592	1.8	36,680	1.6	28,331	1.1	22,897	0.9	10,385	0.4	6,437	0.3	4,372	0.2
Germans	120,191	6.2	70,964	3.8	62,144	3.2	1,609	0.08	5,413	0.2	3,299	0.1	3,783	0.1	3,465	0.1	3,042	0.1	2,447	0.1
Estonians	17,990	0.93	7,893	0.4	7,014	0.4	4,610	0.2	4,334	0.2	3,681	0.2	3,312	0.1	2,652	0.1	2,007	0.1	1,587	0.1
Livonians	—		1,268	0.07	944	0.05	185	0.01	48	0.0	107	0.0	135	0.01	180	0.01	250	0.01	202	0.01
Others	7,486	0.39	5,504	0.3	3,398	0.2	8,648	0.4	13,828	0.6	16,979	0.7	29,275	1.1	24,824	1.1	26,640	1.3	68,665	3.6
Total	1,929,387		1,844,805		1,950,502		2,093,458		2,364,127		2,502,816		2,666,567		2,377,383		2,070,371		1,893,223	

Population of Latvia according to ethnic group 2021–2025
Ethnic group	2021 statistics		2022 statistics		2023 statistics		2024 statistics		2025 statistics	
Ethnic group	Number	%	Number	%	Number	%	Number	%	Number	%
Latvians	1,187,891	62.74%	1,181,534	62.99%	1,175,902	62.45%	1,171,070	62.56%	1,182,008	63.66%
Russians	463,587	24.49%	454,350	24.22%	445,612	23.66%	437,587	23.38%	434,243	23.39%
Ukrainians	42,282	2.23%	41,895	2.23%	56,675	3.01%	59,597	3.18%	52,266	2.81%
Belarusians	58,632	3.10%	57,319	3.06%	55,929	2.97%	54,645	2.92%	53,207	2.87%
Poles	37,203	1.97%	36,276	1.93%	35,446	1.88%	34,782	1.86%	35,140	1.89%
Lithuanians	21,517	1.14%	21,046	1.12%	20,530	1.09%	20,155	1.08%	19,809	1.07%
Roma	4,838	0.26%	4,784	0.26%	4,677	0.25%	4,630	0.25%	4,812	0.26%
Jews	4,372	0.23%	4,231	0.23%	4,076	0.22%	4,019	0.21%	4,168	0.22%
Estonians	1,587	0.08%	1,536	0.08%	1,478	0.08%	1,455	0.08%	1,366	0.07%
Other ethnicities, including not selected and not indicated ethnicity	71,314	3.77%	72,786	3.88%	82,683	4.39%	83,942	4.48%	69,913	3.77%
Total	1,893,223		1,875,757		1,883,008		1,871,882		1,856,932	

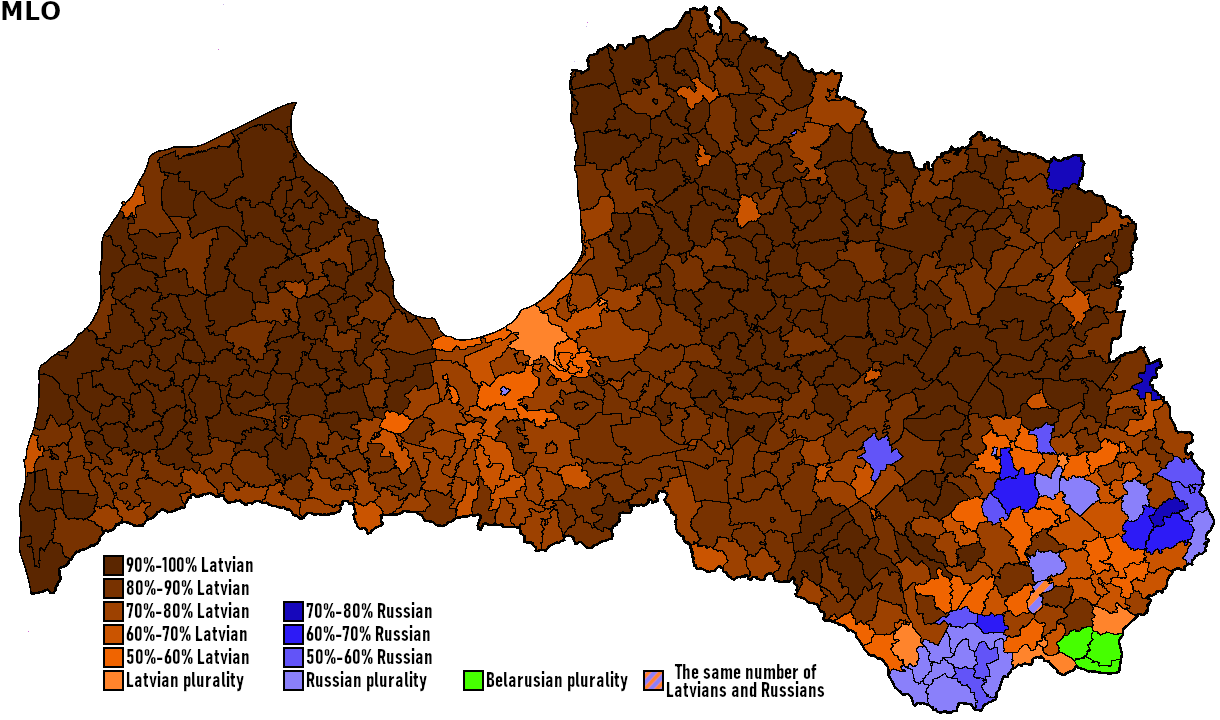
Ethnic composition of Latvia by parishes in 2024

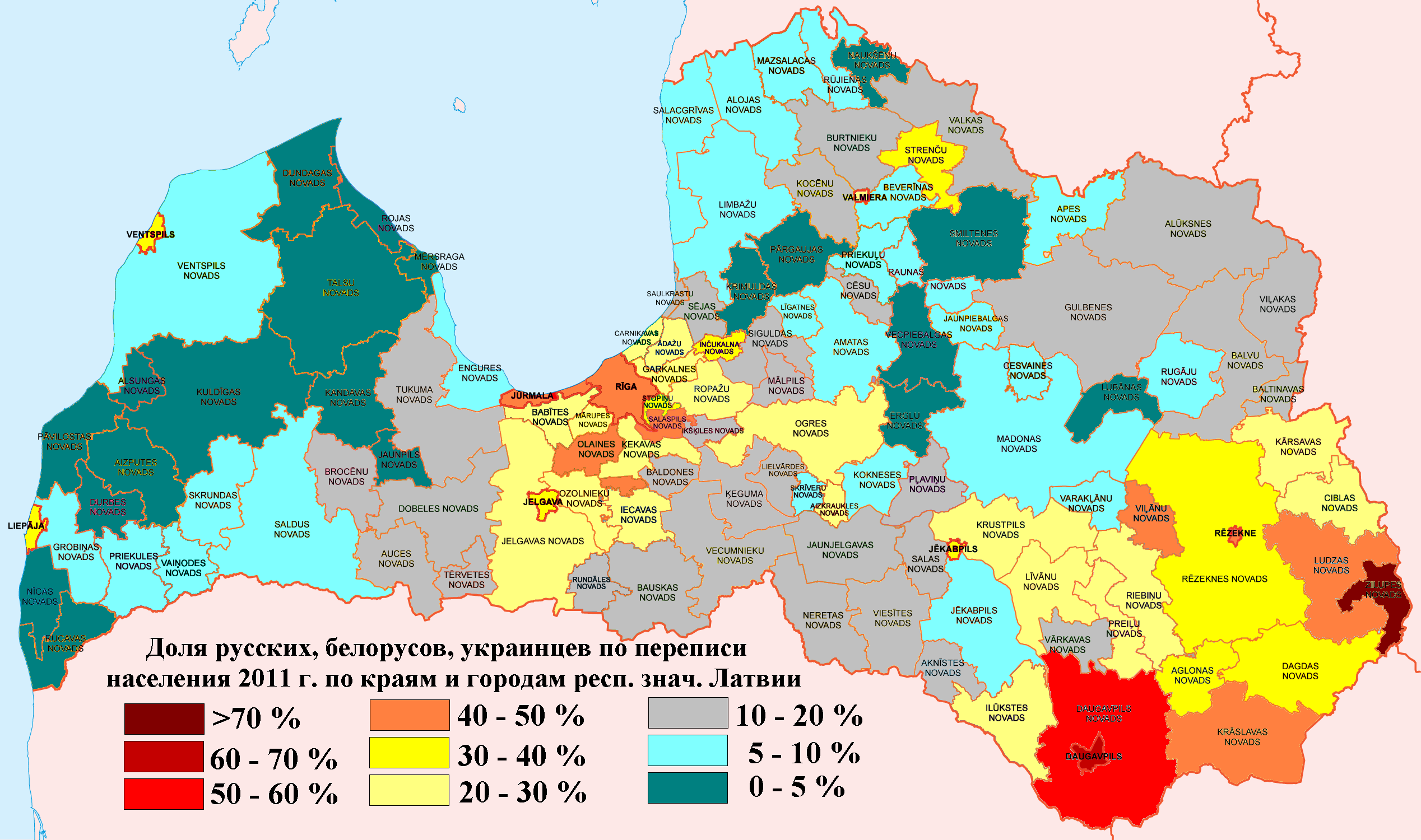
Distribution of Russians, Belarusians and Ukrainians in 2011

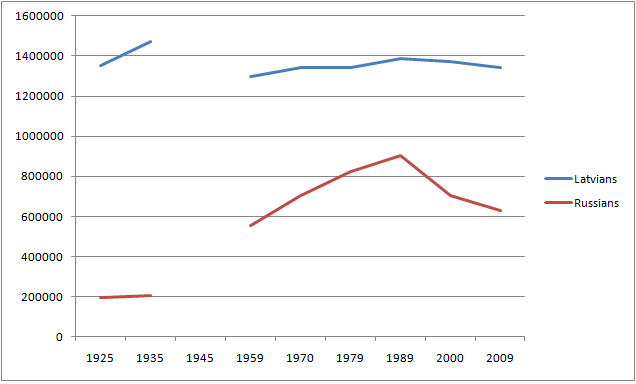
Number of ethnic Latvians and Russians 1925-2009

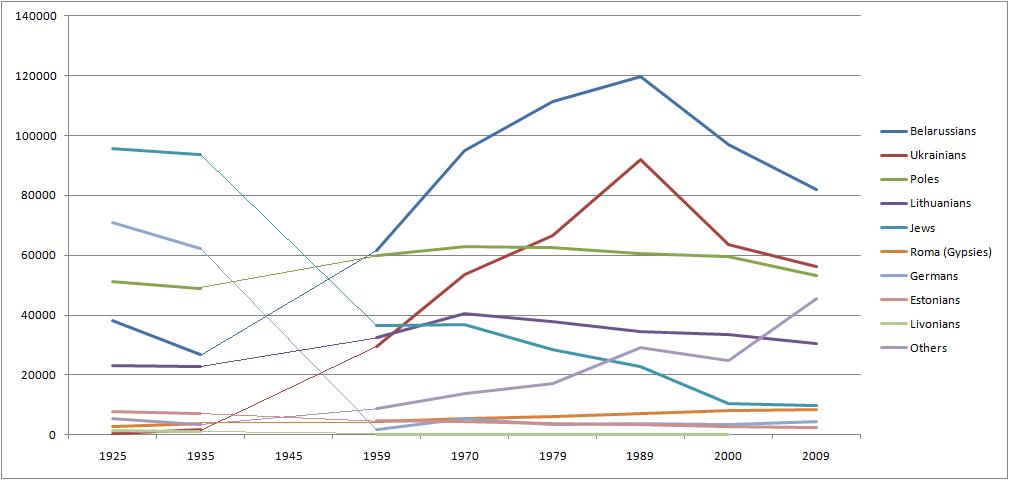
Number of smaller ethnic minorities 1925-2009

== Languages ==
Main language spoken at home in Latvia, 2011 census
Latvian	62.1%
Russian	37.2%
Other	0.7%

- official: Latvian
- considered indigenous in some legislation: Livonian, Latgalian
- other languages registered as main language spoken at home by at least 500 speakers in 2011 census (in declining order): Russian, Belarusian, Ukrainian, Lithuanian, Polish, Romani, Tatar, Yiddish and Hebrew, Estonian, German
- other languages widely spoken: English (46%)
- Latvian Sign Language (legally recognised and supported) and Russian Sign Language

In the 2011 census, 1,164,894 persons in Latvia reported Latvian as their main language spoken at home; 698,757 respondents listed Russian as their main language spoken at home, representing 37.2% of the total population, whereas Latvian was recorded as the main language spoken at home for 62.1%. Latvian was spoken as a second language by 20.8% of the population, and 43.7% spoke Russian as a second language. In total, 71% of ethnic Latvians said they could speak Russian, and 52% of Russians could speak Latvian in the 2000 census.

Main language spoken at home in Latvia, end 2017 data
Latvian	64.0%
Russian	34.6%
Other	1.4%

In August 2019, the Central Statistical Bureau published new data indicating that Latvian was the native language of 60.8% of Latvia's population per 1 January 2018, a 2.6% increase compared to the 2000 census. 62.2% of the population was 'ethnically Latvian'. The percentage of native Latvian speakers increased in all statistical regions, especially in the Rīga capital region and Pierīga region around it (4.6%). The number of native Russian speakers dropped in all regions; in Latgale, the number of native Russian speakers also dropped, although their percentage remained the same at 55.5%, the highest of the country. Compared to the 2011 census, the share of people speaking Latvian at home rose by 1.9%, while the number of Russian home speakers dropped by 2.6%. 90.7% of ethnic Russians indicated they spoke Russian at home, while 8.5% of them indicated they spoke Latvian at home. Inter-linguistic marriage was an important factor why, for example, some non-native Latvian speakers who married native Latvian speakers switched to speaking Latvian at home. The percentage of Russian home speakers gradually increased with age from 30.0% amongst 0–4-year-olds to 44.2% amongst 55–64-year-olds, while Latvian home speakers gradually decreased with age from 69.2% amongst 0–4-year-olds to 55.0% amongst 55–64-year-olds, indicating that children in Latvia are increasingly being raised and educated in Latvian.

== Religion ==
Religion in Latvia (2011)
Lutheranism	34.2%
Roman Catholicism	24.1%
Russian Orthodox	17.8%
Old Believers	1.6%
Other Christian	1.2%
Other or none	21.1%

The largest religion in Latvia is Christianity (79%), though only about 7% of the population attends religious services regularly. The largest groups as of 2011 were:

- Evangelical Lutheran Church of Latvia – 700,000
- Roman Catholic – 500,000
- Russian Orthodox – 400,000

In the Eurobarometer Poll 2010, 38% of Latvian citizens responded that "they believe there is a God", while 48% answered that "they believe there is some sort of spirit or life force" and 11% stated that "they do not believe there is any sort of spirit, God, or life force".

Lutheranism was more prominent before the Soviet occupation, when it was a majority religion of ~60% due to strong historical links with the Nordic countries and influence of the Hansa, and Germany in general. Since then, Lutheranism has declined to a slightly greater extent than Roman Catholicism in all three Baltic states. The Evangelical Lutheran Church, with an estimated 600,000 members in 1956, was affected most adversely. An internal document of 18 March 1987, near the end of communist rule, spoke of an active membership that had shrunk to only 25,000 in Latvia, but the faith has since experienced a revival. Moreover, modern Evangelical Protestant denominations are spreading worldwide, including Latvia. The country's Orthodox Christians belong to the Latvian Orthodox Church, a semi-autonomous body within the Russian Orthodox Church. In 2011, there were 416 Jews and 319 Muslims living in Latvia.

There are more than 600 Latvian neopagans, Dievturi, whose religion is based on Latvian mythology. About 21% of the total population is not affiliated with a specific religion.

== Depopulation ==
Latvia is one of the most depopulating countries in the world, losing about 20,000 people every year. Between 1990 and 2024, Latvia's population decreased by 780,000 people, from 2.66 million to 1.88 million, or 30%, and continues to decline. Over the next thirty years Latvia will lose another 23.5% as a result of continued depopulation.

According to OECD estimates, the causes of depopulation are very high emigration, especially of national minorities, high consumption of alcohol and tobacco, low quality of health care and their concentration in large cities, and demographic transition.

By 2045, Latvia's population is projected to be 1.5 million, and by 2060 it is expected to be smaller than Estonia's population. By 2100, Latvia's population is expected to fall to just 1.16 million.

== See also ==
- Aging of Europe
- List of cities in the Baltic states by population
