= List of regions of Baltic States by GDP =

This article is about the list of regions of Baltic States by GDP.

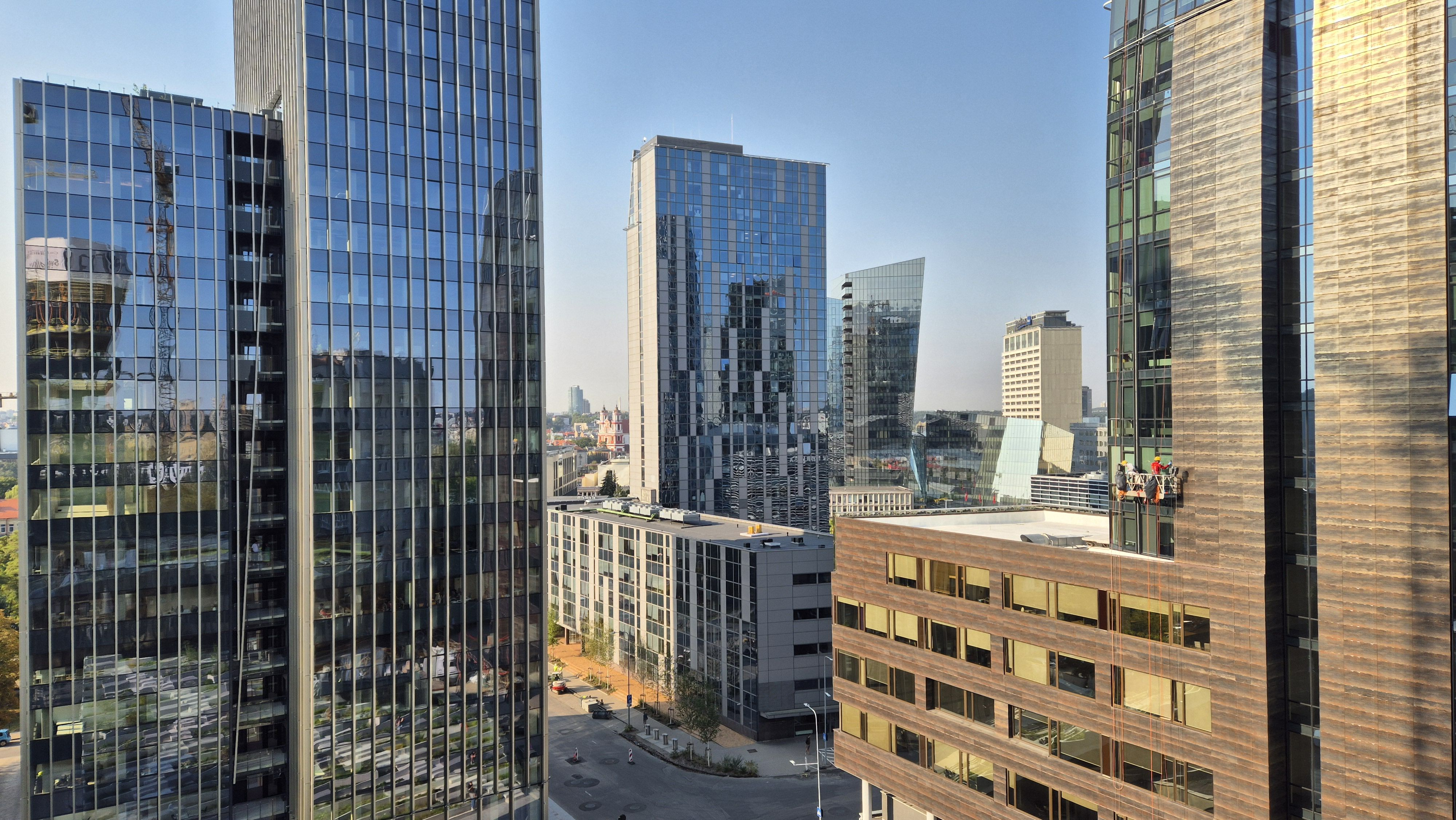
Vilnius has the largest GDP per capita in Baltic States (€41,500)

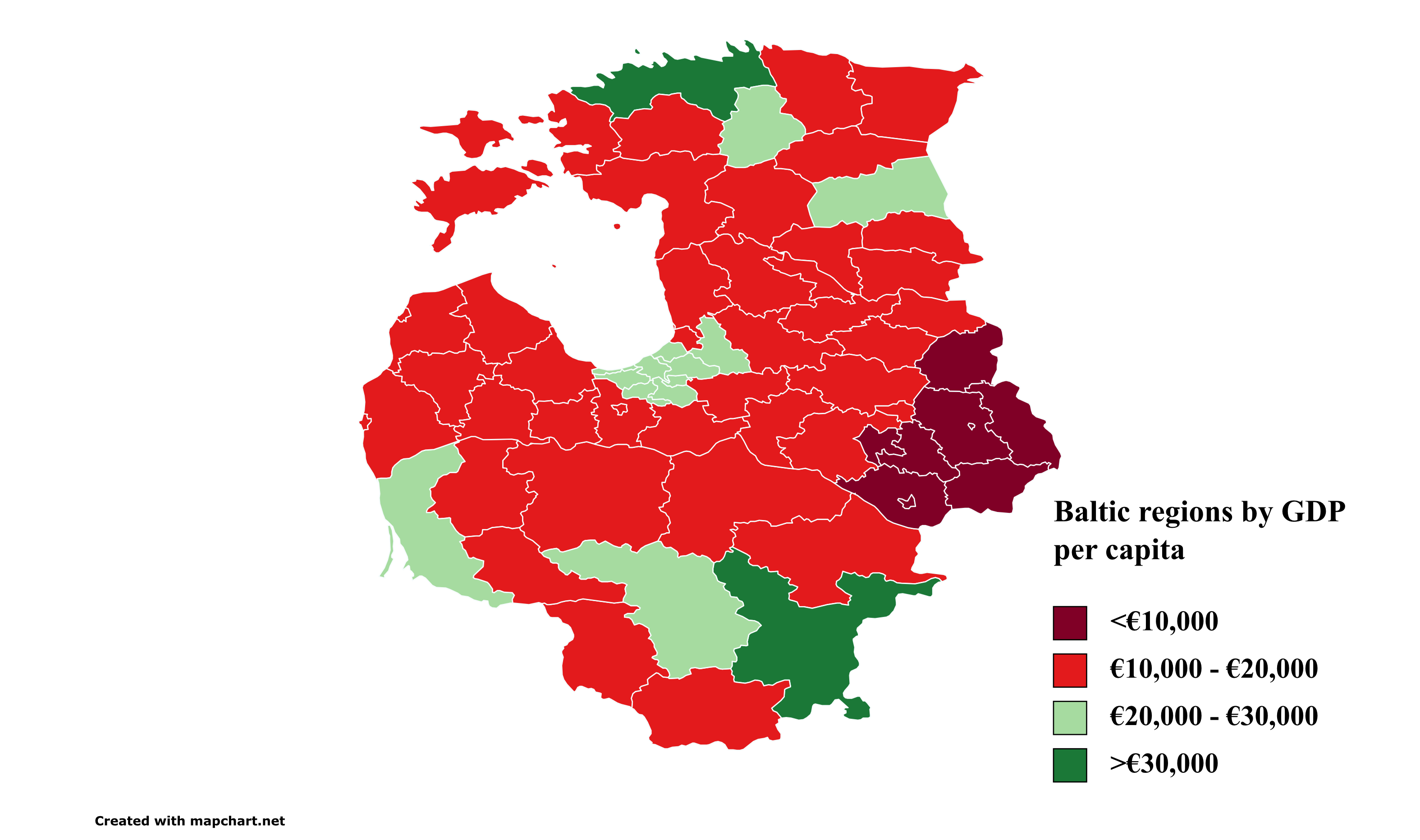
Baltic regions by GDP per capita

Regions according to their gross domestic product in EUR.

== List ==
Rank	Region	Country	GDP (bil. €)	GDP per capita (€)	Year
1	Vilnius County	Lithuania	36.17	41,500	2024
2	Riga Planning Region	Latvia	26.05	30,400	2023
3	Harju County	Estonia	25.16	38,900	2024
4	Kaunas County	Lithuania	15.86	27,000	2024
5	Klaipėda County	Lithuania	8.11	23,700	2024
6	Šiauliai County	Lithuania	5.14	19,300	2024
7	Tartu County	Estonia	4.71	28,600	2024
8	Kurzeme Planning Region	Latvia	4.03	14,500	2023
9	Panevėžys County	Lithuania	3.85	18,500	2024
10	Vidzeme Planning Region	Latvia	3.54	12,800	2023
11	Zemgale Planning Region	Latvia	3.07	13,600	2023
12	Latgale Planning Region	Latvia	2.82	11,500	2023
13	Ida-Viru County	Estonia	2.35	17,900	2024
14	Telšiai County	Lithuania	2.45	18,800	2024
15	Marijampolė County	Lithuania	2.09	15,600	2024
16	Alytus County	Lithuania	2.01	15,000	2024
17	Utena County	Lithuania	1.87	15,000	2024
18	Pärnu County	Estonia	1.79	19,300	2024
19	Tauragė County	Lithuania	1.44	16,000	2024
20	Lääne-Viru County	Estonia	1.06	17,900	2024
21	Viljandi County	Estonia	0.88	19,500	2024
22	Järva County	Estonia	0.58	19,200	2024
23	Saare County	Estonia	0.57	17,900	2024
24	Rapla County	Estonia	0.56	16,400	2024
25	Võru County	Estonia	0.54	15,900	2024
26	Jõgeva County	Estonia	0.47	17,200	2024
27	Valga County	Estonia	0.41	14,800	2024
28	Põlva County	Estonia	0.35	15,000	2024
29	Lääne County	Estonia	0.35	17,200	2024
30	Hiiu County	Estonia	0.16	18,600	2024
