= Lejasstrazdi =

Village in Latvia

Coordinates: 56°40′N 23°19′E

Lejasstrazdi is a village in the Dobele Parish of Dobele Municipality in the Semigallia region and the Zemgale Planning Region in Latvia.
