= Aizstrautnieki =

Village in Latvia; centre of Dobele Parish, Dobele Municipality

Aizstrautnieki is a village and the administrative center of Dobele Parish of Dobele Municipality. As of 1 January 2021, Aizstrautnieki had an estimated population of 235 inhabitants. The village dates back to the years after World War II, with the first dwellings appearing before the war after the Latvian Land Reform of 1920 split up lands of the former Dobe Manor (Doben).

The village lies at approximately 56.6875° N latitude and 23.2125° E longitude with an elevation of 69 metres above sea level. It is located in the historical region of Semigallia the Zemgale Planning Region.
