= List of regions of Baltic States by Human Development Index =

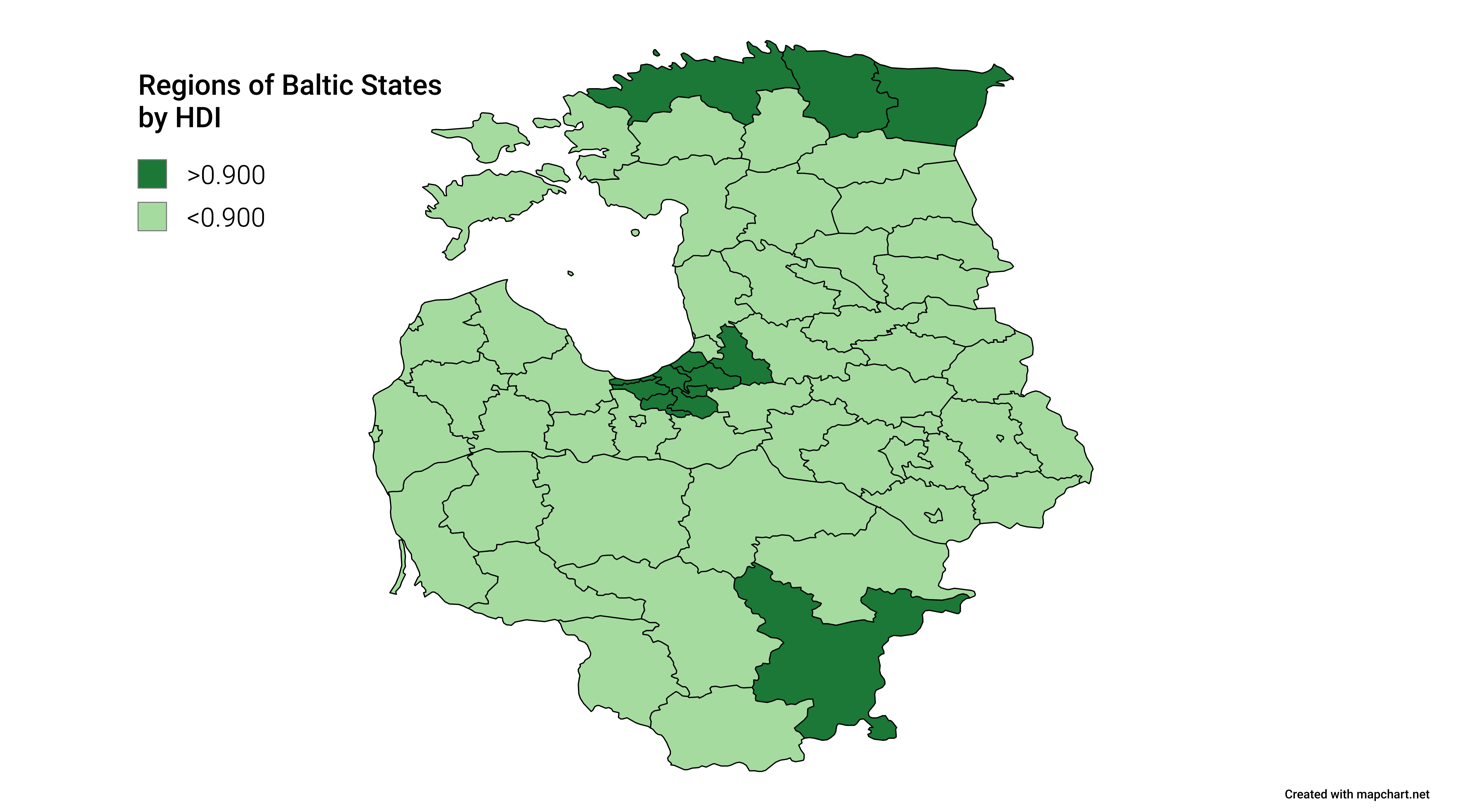
Regions of Baltic States by Human Development Index

This is a list of the regions of the Baltic countries Estonia, Latvia and Lithuania by Human Development Index as of 2023.

Rank	Region	Country	HDI (2023)
Very high human development
1	Northern Estonia	Estonia	0.947
2	Riga Region	Latvia	0.947
3	Vilnius County	Lithuania	0.934
4	Pierīga Region	Latvia	0.909
–	Estonia (average)		0.905
5	Kaunas County	Lithuania	0.901
6	Klaipėda County	Lithuania	0.895
–	Lithuania (average)		0.895
–	Latvia (average)		0.889
7	Kurzeme Region	Latvia	0.880
8	South Estonia	Estonia	0.878
9	Vidzeme Region	Latvia	0.878
10	Zemgale Region	Latvia	0.871
11	Šiauliai County	Lithuania	0.868
12	Panevėžys County	Lithuania	0.866
13	Telšiai County	Lithuania	0.865
14	Northeastern Estonia	Estonia	0.862
14	Alytus County	Lithuania	0.861
16	Western Estonia	Estonia	0.860
16	Latgale Region	Latvia	0.856
18	Utena County	Lithuania	0.853
19	Marijampolė County	Lithuania	0.850
20	Central Estonia	Estonia	0.843
21	Tauragė County	Lithuania	0.840

== See also ==
- List of countries by Human Development Index
- List of regions of Baltic States by GDP
