= Bitenieki =

Village in Latvia

Coordinates: 56.6700°N 23.2572°E

Bitenieki is a village in the Dobele Parish of Dobele Municipality in the Semigallia region of Latvia and the Zemgale Planning Region.
