= Planning region =

A planning region is a type of geographic region that exists in certain polities:

- Planning regions of Latvia
- Planning regions of Connecticut
