= Bērzbeķe =

Village in Latvia

Coordinates: 56°40′N 23°14′E

Bērzbeķe is a village in the Dobele Parish of Dobele Municipality in the Semigallia region of Latvia and the Zemgale Planning Region.
