= Latgale (disambiguation) =

Latgale, also known as Latgalia or Latgallia, is a historical and cultural region of Latvia.

Latgale may also refer to:

- Latgale Planning Region, a planning and statistical region of Latvia
- Latgale Province, a province in Republic of Latvia (1918–1940)
- Latgale Suburb, Riga, an administrative district of Riga, Latvia
- Latgale neighbourhood, a neighbourhood of Riga in Latgale Suburb
- Latgallia (Saeima constituency), constituency of the Saeima, the national legislature of Latvia
- DHK Latgale, a former Latvian hockey league team based in Daugavpils

== See also ==
- Latgalian (disambiguation)
