= Latgalian =

Latgalian may refer to:

- Something of or relating to Latgale, a region in eastern Latvia
- Latgalians, an ancient Baltic tribe
- Latgalians (modern), the modern inhabitants of Latgale
- Latgalian language, the language spoken in that region

== See also ==
- Latgale (disambiguation)
