= Dobele Parish =

Parish in Dobele Municipality, Latvia

- parish of Latvia
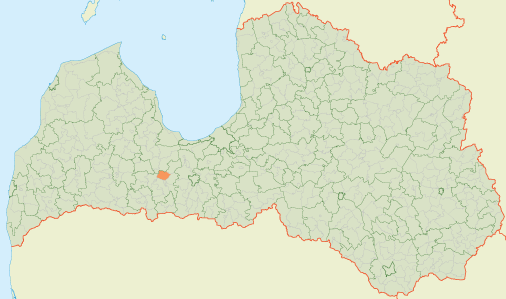
- 56°40′54″N 23°15′32″E
- Country: Latvia

Area
  - Total: 71.07 km^{2} (27.44 sq mi)
  - Land: 71.07 km^{2} (27.44 sq mi)
  - Water: 1.6 km^{2} (0.62 sq mi)

Population (1 January 2025)
  - Total: 712
  - Density: 10.0/km^{2} (25.9/sq mi)

Dobele Parish (Latvian: Dobeles pagasts) is an administrative unit of Dobele Municipality in the Semigallia region of Latvia. The administrative center is the village of Aizstrautnieki.

The villages and settlements of the parish include Lejasstrazdi, Aizstrautnieki, Bērzbeķe and Bitenieki.
