= Kurzeme Planning Region =

Planning and statistical region of Latvia

Kurzeme Region
- Planning Region
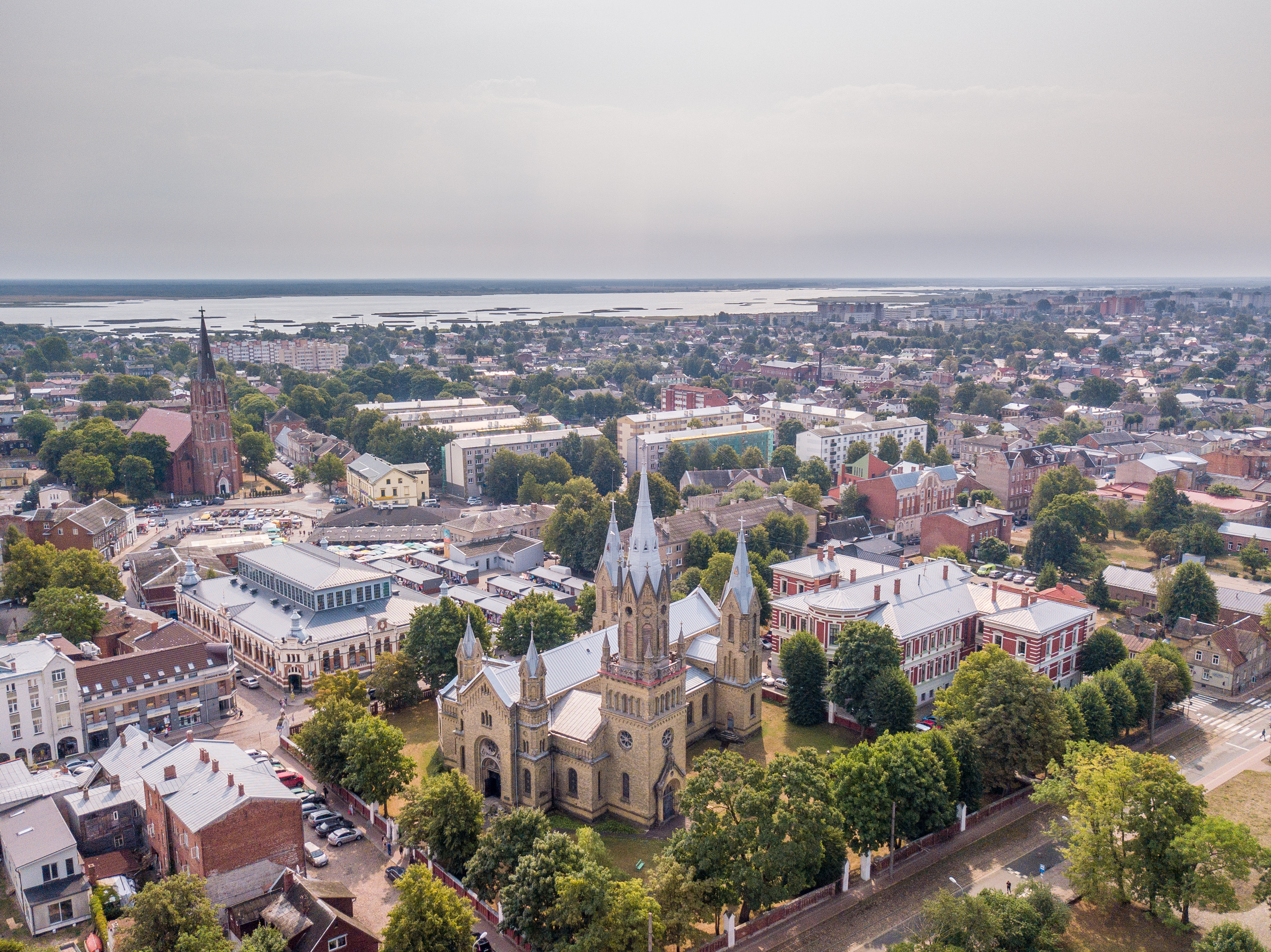
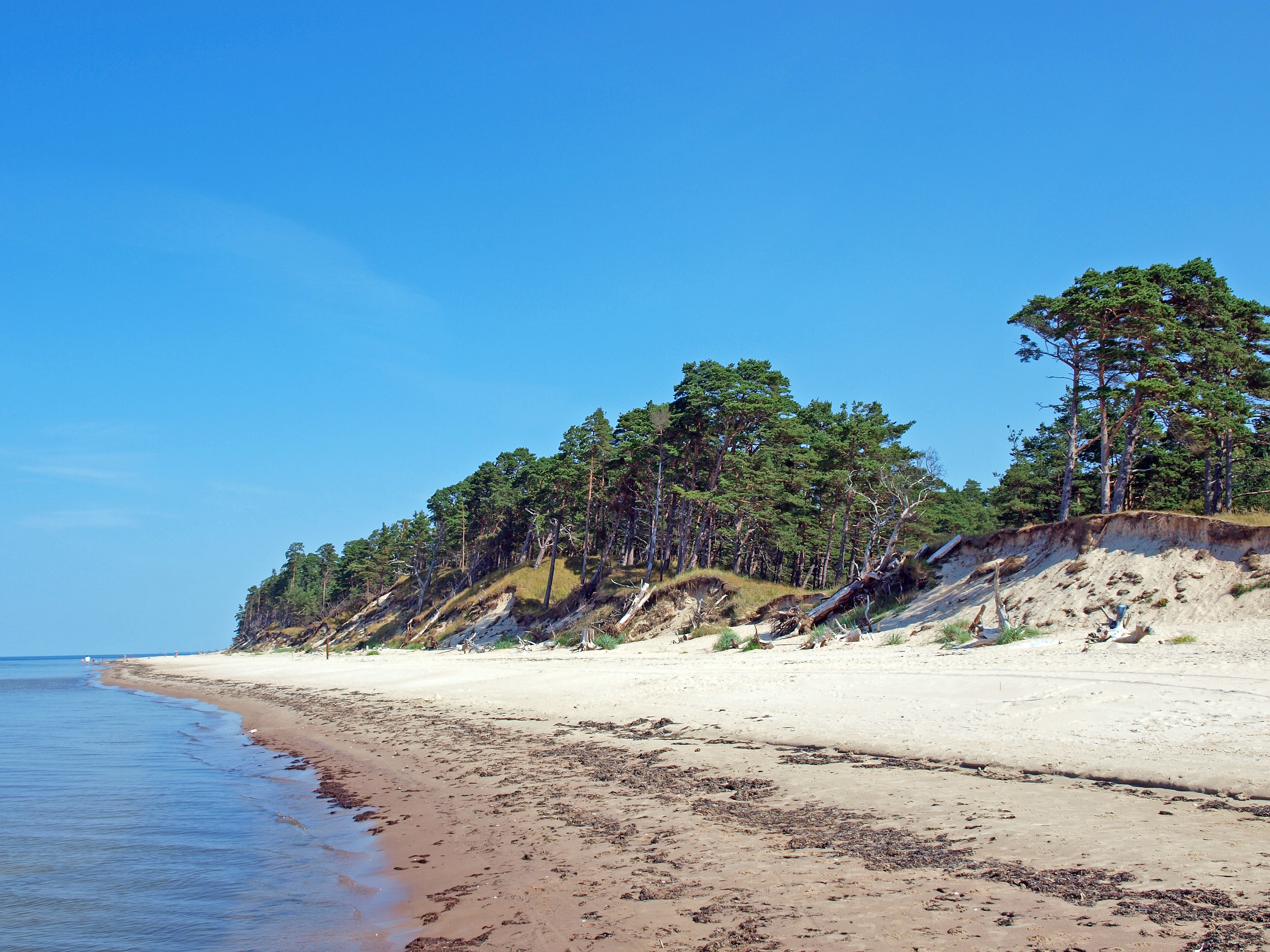
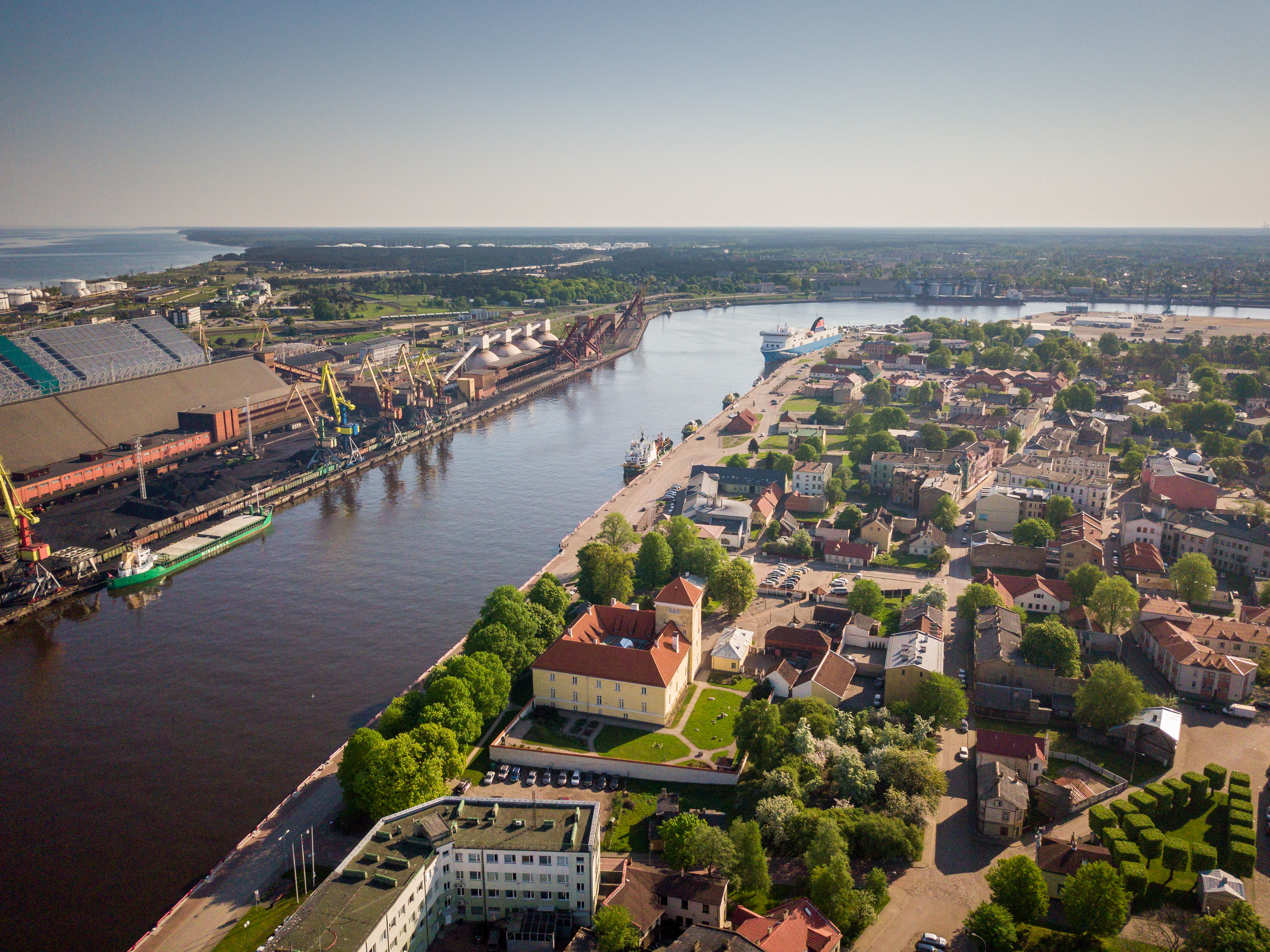
- Liepāja the biggest city in region; Coastal dunes in South Kurzeme Municipality; Ventspils second largest city in region

- Logo

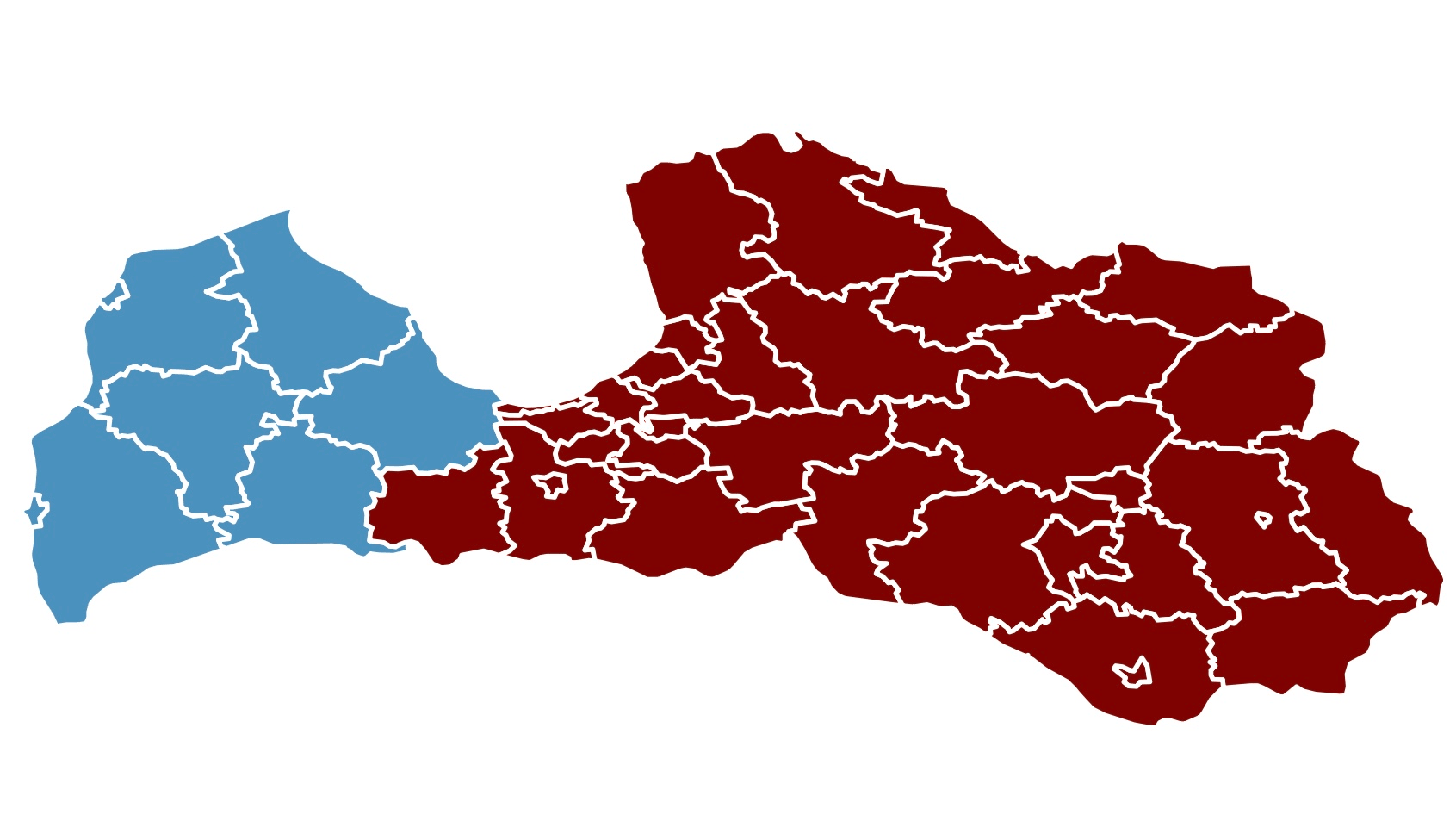
- Coordinates: 57°0′0″N 22°0′0″E
- Country: Latvia
- Largest city: Liepāja

Area
  - Total: 16,046 km^{2} (6,195 sq mi)

Population (2025)
  - Total: 274,754
  - Density: 17.123/km^{2} (44.348/sq mi)

GDP
  - Total: €3.764 billion (2022)
  - Per capita: €13,552 (2022)
- HDI (2022): 0.870 very high · 3rd
- Website: kurzemesregions.lv

Kurzeme Region (Latvian: Kurzemes reģions), officially Kurzeme Planning Region (Latvian: Kurzemes plānošanas reģions), is one of the five planning regions of Latvia, it is situated in the western part of Latvia, at the shores of the Baltic Sea and Gulf of Riga. The state institution was founded on 2 October 2006, based on the creation of the region territory as prescribed by Regulations No. 133 of the Cabinet of Ministers as of 25 March 2003, the "Regulations on Territories of Planning Regions". As of 2020, the region's population was 237,407.

== Organisation ==
According to the "Law on Regional Development Kurzeme Planning Region", Kurzeme Region is supervised by the Ministry of Regional Development and Local Government, and the decision-making authority is Kurzeme Planning Region Development Council (KPRDC), which consists of 19 deputies appointed by the heads of the region's component municipalities.

== Geography ==
The territory of the Kurzeme Region was created in 2006 utilising and now includes: Dienvidkurzeme, Kuldīga, Saldus, Talsi, Tukums and Ventspils districts as well as the cities of Liepāja and Ventspils. As of 1 July 2009 the region consist of 6 municipalities and 2 cities within an area of 13,596 km^{2}.

== Economy ==
The gross regional product (GRP) of the region was €2.8 billion in 2020.

== Demography ==
Kurzeme Region had a population of 240,113 inhabitants in 2019 and a population density of 17.66/km^{2}.

== Tourism ==
The Pedvale Open Air Museum, near Sabile is a national sculpture park. It preserves the historic landscape, and is a showcase for contemporary sculpture.

== See also ==
- Planning regions of Latvia
- Administrative divisions of Latvia
