= Planning regions of Latvia =

Subnational regions

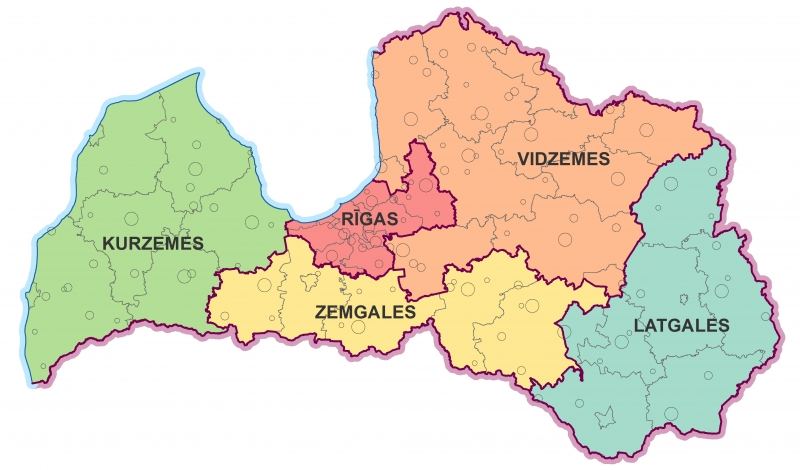
Planning regions after 2021 reform

Latvia is divided into five planning regions (Latvian: Latvijas plānošanas reģioni): Kurzeme, Latgale, Riga, Vidzeme, and Zemgale. They are equivalent to the five statistical regions in Latvia (Latvian: Latvijas statistiskie reģioni). The boundaries of these regions correspond to the borders of Latvia's municipalities. However, the planning regions are not considered administrative territorial divisions, as they are not mentioned in the law governing Latvia's administrative territorial structure.

Following the 2021 reform, certain areas of the Riga Region were incorporated into the Kurzeme and Vidzeme regions.

== List ==
Regions	Largest city	Population (2025)	Area (km^{2})
Riga Planning Region	Riga	847,162	3,158
Kurzeme Planning Region	Liepāja	274,754	16,046
Vidzeme Planning Region	Valmiera	273,957	19,770
Latgale Planning Region	Daugavpils	239,166	14,549
Zemgale Planning Region	Jelgava	221,893	10,733
Latvia	Riga	1,856,932	64,256

== History ==
Regional institutions began formation 1997 according to municipal initiatives on the planning of common development. Following legislation on regional development, the five planning regions were created according to the 5 May 2009 decision no. 391 of the Latvian Cabinet of Ministers: "Decisions on Territories of the Planning Regions.

Statistical regions were established according to the main principles set out in the Regulation (EC) No 1059/2003 of the European Parliament and of the Council of 26 May 2003 on the establishment of a common classification of territorial units for statistics (NUTS) (hereinafter NUTS Regulation), further amended. This NUTS Regulation directly concerns all Member States of the European Union and from 1 May 2004 it is also binding upon Latvia.

The statistical regions of Latvia are not administrative regions, as they have been formed for statistical purposes. Therefore, they are not mentioned in the law that determines the administrative divisions of Latvia.

NUTS Regulation was established to divide economic territory of EU into similar territorial units for the purpose of collection, compilation and dissemination of harmonised regional statistics in the EU. Shortly before accession to EU, Central Statistical Bureau of Latvia, the Ministry of Environmental Protection and Regional Development and representatives of the planning regions came to an agreement about the structure of statistical regions (order No.271 of the Cabinet of Ministers dated 28 April 2004 "On the Statistical Regions of the Republic of Latvia and Administrative Units Therein", further amended.)

Statistical regions of Latvia were approved by Regulation (EC) No 1888/2005 of the European Parliament and of the Council of 26 October 2005 amending Regulation (EC) No 1059/2003 on the establishment of a common classification of territorial units for statistics (NUTS) by reason of the accession of the Czech Republic, Estonia, Cyprus, Latvia, Lithuania, Hungary, Malta, Poland, Slovenia and Slovakia to the European Union.

The four statistical regions Kurzeme, Latgale, Vidzeme and Zemgale aligned with the planning regions of Latvia (Regulation No.391 of the Cabinet of Ministers dated 5 May 2009 "On the territories of the Planning Regions.", further amended), but Rīga and Pierīga statistical regions comprise the territory of the Rīga planning region. After new planning regions were introduced in 2021, the borders no longer align.

Planning regions before 2021

Regions	Largest city	Area	Population	(per km²)
Riga	Riga	10,132 km²	989,525	(98/km²)
Kurzeme	Liepāja	13,596 km²	233,229	(17/km²)
Latgale	Daugavpils	14,549 km²	247,220	(17/km²)
Zemgale	Jelgava	10,733 km²	225,017	(21/km²)
Vidzeme	Valmiera	15,246 km²	180,766	(12/km²)
Latvia	Riga	64,256 km²	1,875,757	(29/km²)

The 2021 reformed territories of the planning region are determined by the Cabinet of Ministers' regulations of 22 June 2021 No. 418: "Rules on the Territories of the Planning Region".

The structure of Statistical Regions is approved by order No. 911 of the Cabinet of Ministers dated 7 December 2021 "On the Statistical Regions of the Republic of Latvia and Administrative Units Therein", further amended.

NUTS Code	Regions	Largest City	Area	Population* – (per km²)	GDP (billion €)	GDP per capita (€)
LV006	Rīga	Rīga	304 km^{2}	632,614 - (2,081/km^{2})	19.261	31,600
LV007	Pierīga	Jūrmala	10,134 km^{2}	370,589 – (37/km^{2})	-	-
LV003	Kurzeme	Liepāja	13,606 km^{2}	240,113 – (18/km^{2})	3.764	13,600
LV005	Latgale	Daugavpils	14,550 km^{2}	260,226 – (18/km^{2})	2.404	9,700
LV009	Zemgale	Jelgava	10,732 km^{2}	230,331 – (21/km^{2})	2.904	12,900
LV008	Vidzeme	Valmiera	15,245 km^{2}	186,095 – (12/km^{2})	3.291	11,900
LV00	Latvija	Rīga	64,572 km^{2}	1,919,968 – (30/km^{2})	36.104	19,100
* Data as of 30 December 2021, GDP data as of 2022

== See also ==
- Historical Latvian Lands
