= Vidzeme Planning Region =

Vidzeme Region
- Planning Region
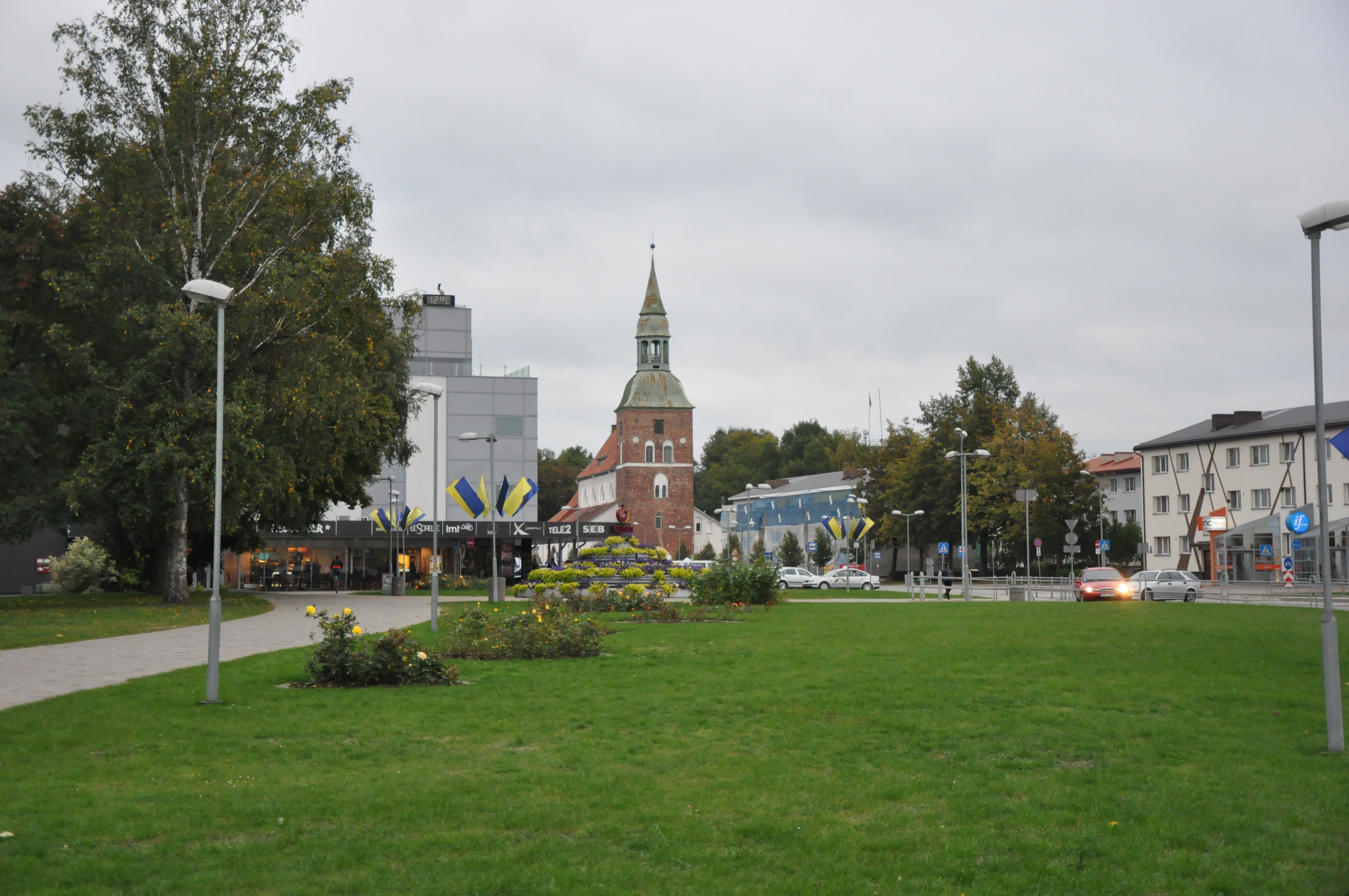
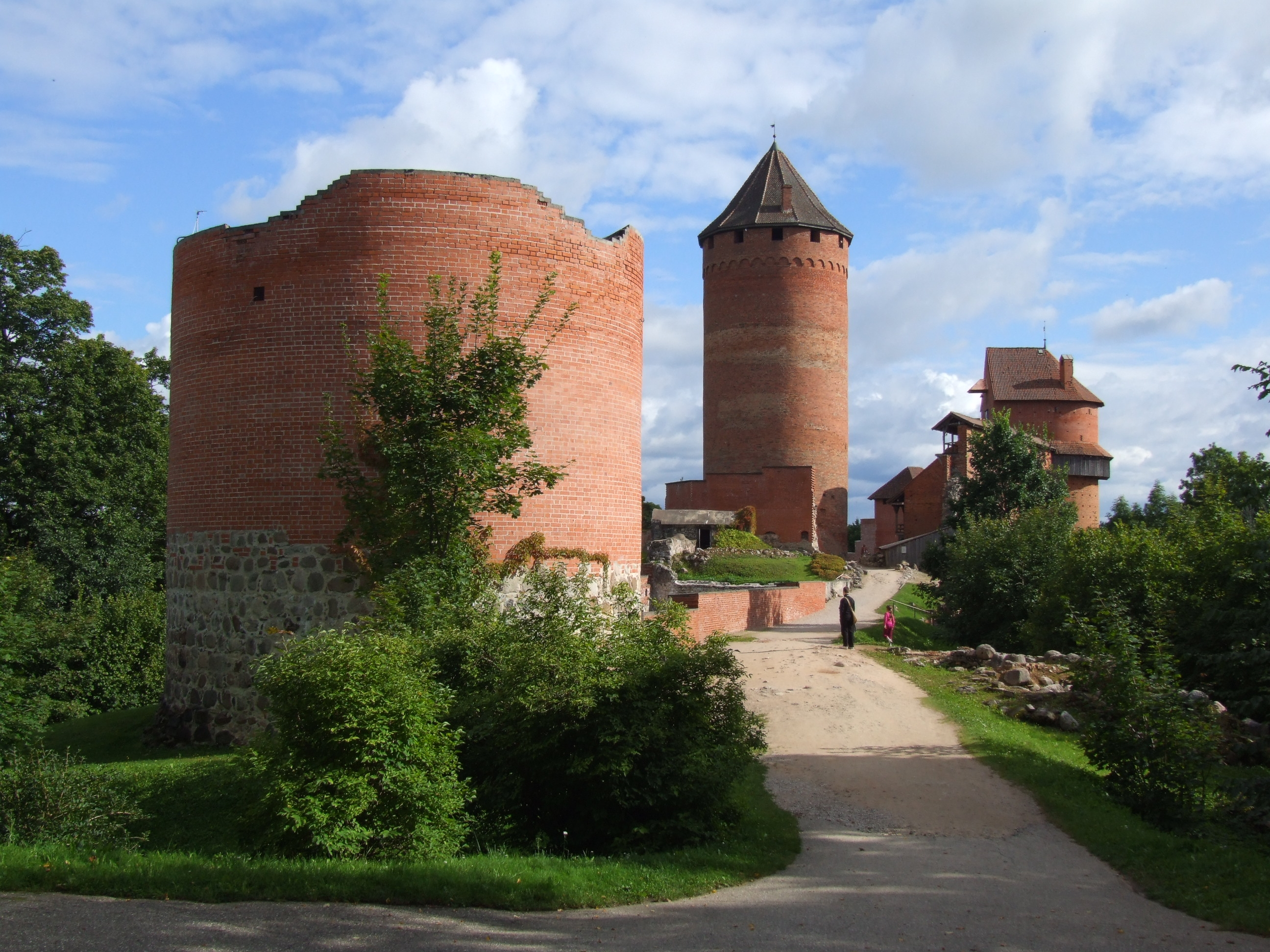
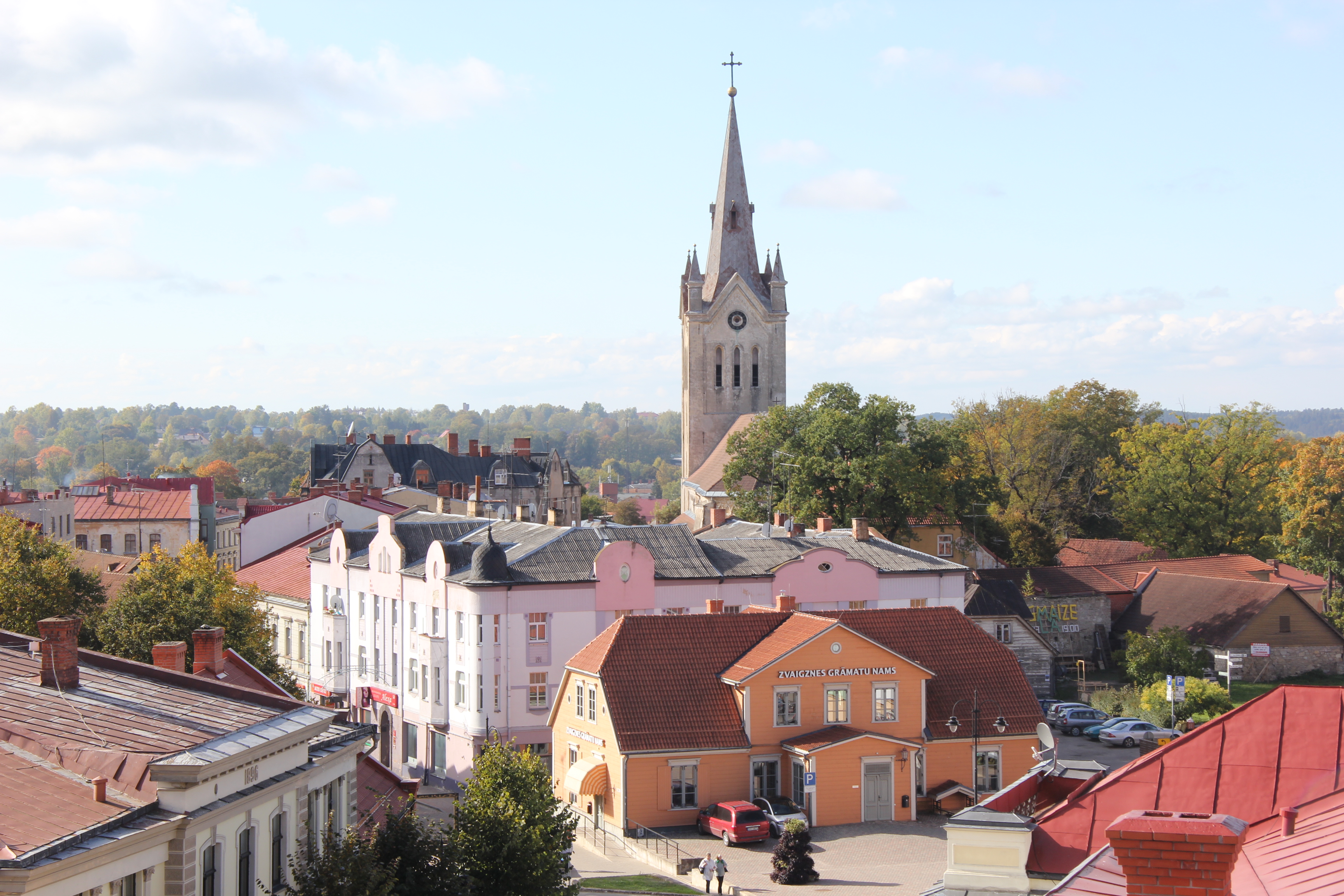
- Valmiera the biggest city in region; Krustpils Castle; Cēsis second largest city in region

- Logo
- Motto: "Ceļš Ved Augšup!" (The Only Way is Up!)
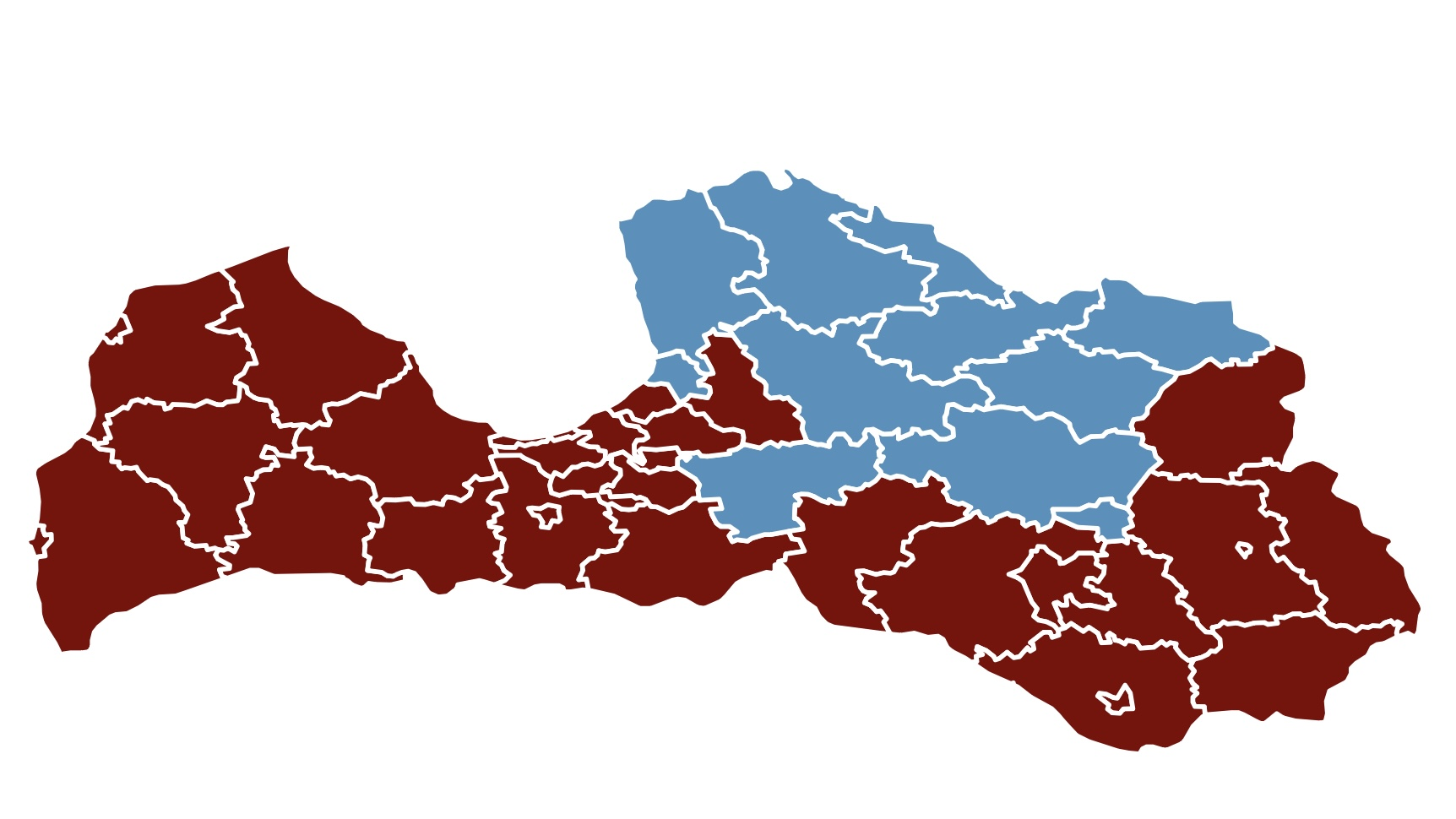
- Country: Latvia
- Largest city: Valmiera

Area
  - Total: 19,770 km^{2} (7,630 sq mi)

Population (2022)
  - Total: 276,449
  - Density: 13.98/km^{2} (36.22/sq mi)

GDP
  - Total: €3.291 billion (2022)
  - Per capita: €11,869 (2022)
- HDI (2022): 0.868 very high · 4th
- Website: http://www.vidzeme.lv

Vidzeme Region (Latvian: Vidzemes reģions), officially Vidzeme Planning Region (Latvian: Vidzemes plānošanas reģions) is one of the five planning regions of Latvia, it is situated in the northern part of Latvia. The state institution was founded on 2 October 2006, based on the creation of the region territory as prescribed by Regulations No. 133 of the Cabinet of Ministers as of 25 March 2003, the "Regulations on Territories of Planning Regions". As of 2020, the region's population was 211,309.

== Municipalities ==
| Municipalities | Population (2022) | Population (2021) | % (2021) | Area (km²) | % |
|---|---|---|---|---|---|
| Alūksne Municipality | 13,562 | 13,861 | 5.0 | 1,699.8 | 12.7 |
| Cēsis Municipality | 40,810 | 41,161 | 14.8 | 2,668.2 | 14.0 |
| Gulbene Municipality | 19,109 | 19,619 | 7.0 | 1,876.1 | 9.8 |
| Limbaži Municipality | 28,263 | 28,692 | 10.3 | 2,440.8 | 12.7 |
| Madona Municipality | 31,037 | 31,637 | 11.4 | 3,633.8 | 19.0 |
| Ogre Municipality | 57,591 | 57,617 | 20.7 | 1,839.4 | 9.6 |
| Saulkrasti Municipality | 9,407 | 9,230 | 3.3 | 277.8 | 1.5 |
| Smiltene Municipality | 17,904 | 18,155 | 6.5 | 1801.3 | 9.4 |
| Valka Municipality | 7,545 | 7,596 | 2.7 | 910.3 | 4.8 |
| Valmiera Municipality | 50,799 | 51,370 | 18.4 | 2,946.0 | 15.4 |
| Vidzeme Planning Region | 276,037 | 278,792 | 100.0 | 19,183.2 | 100.0 |

== Economy ==
The gross regional product (GRP) of the region was €2.0 billion in 2020.

== Demography ==
Vidzeme Region had a population of 211,309 inhabitants in 2020.

== See also ==
- Planning regions of Latvia
- Administrative divisions of Latvia
