= Latgale Planning Region =

- Planning region
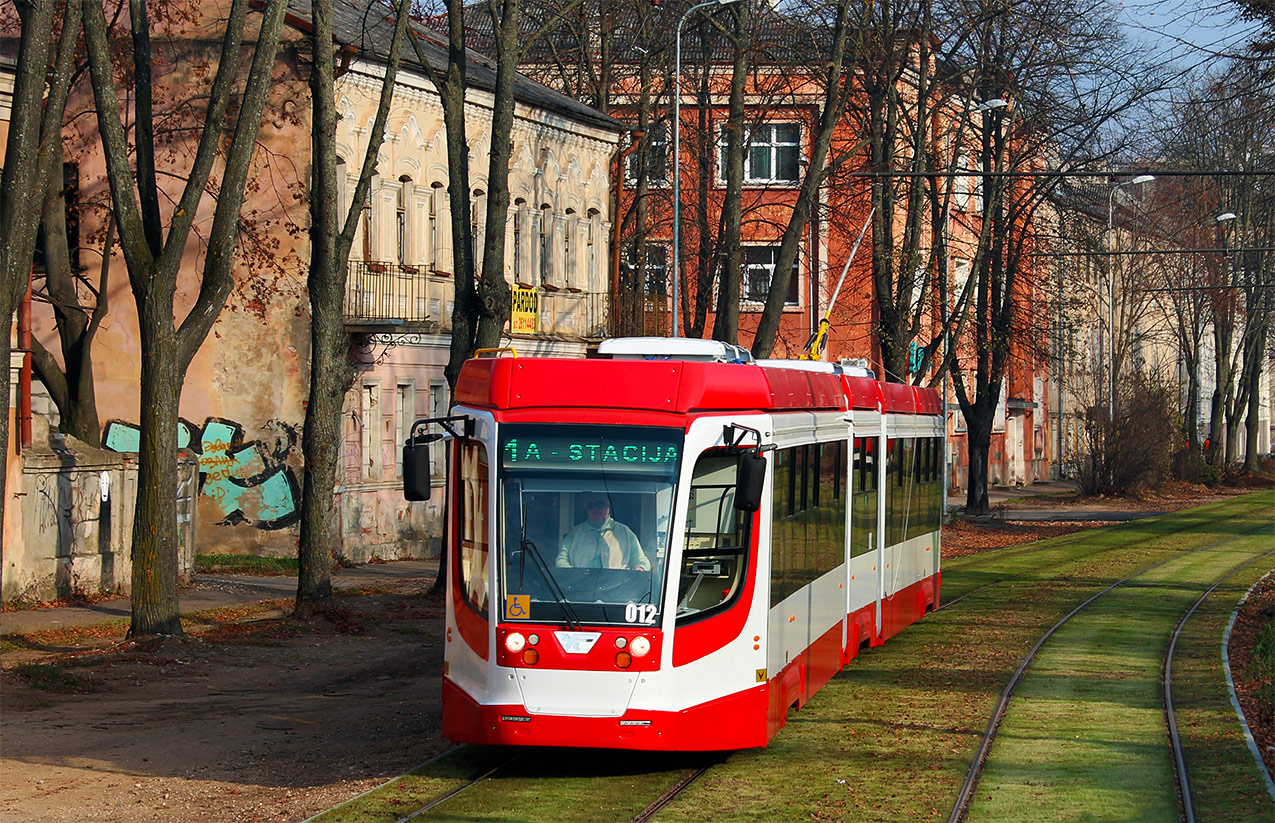
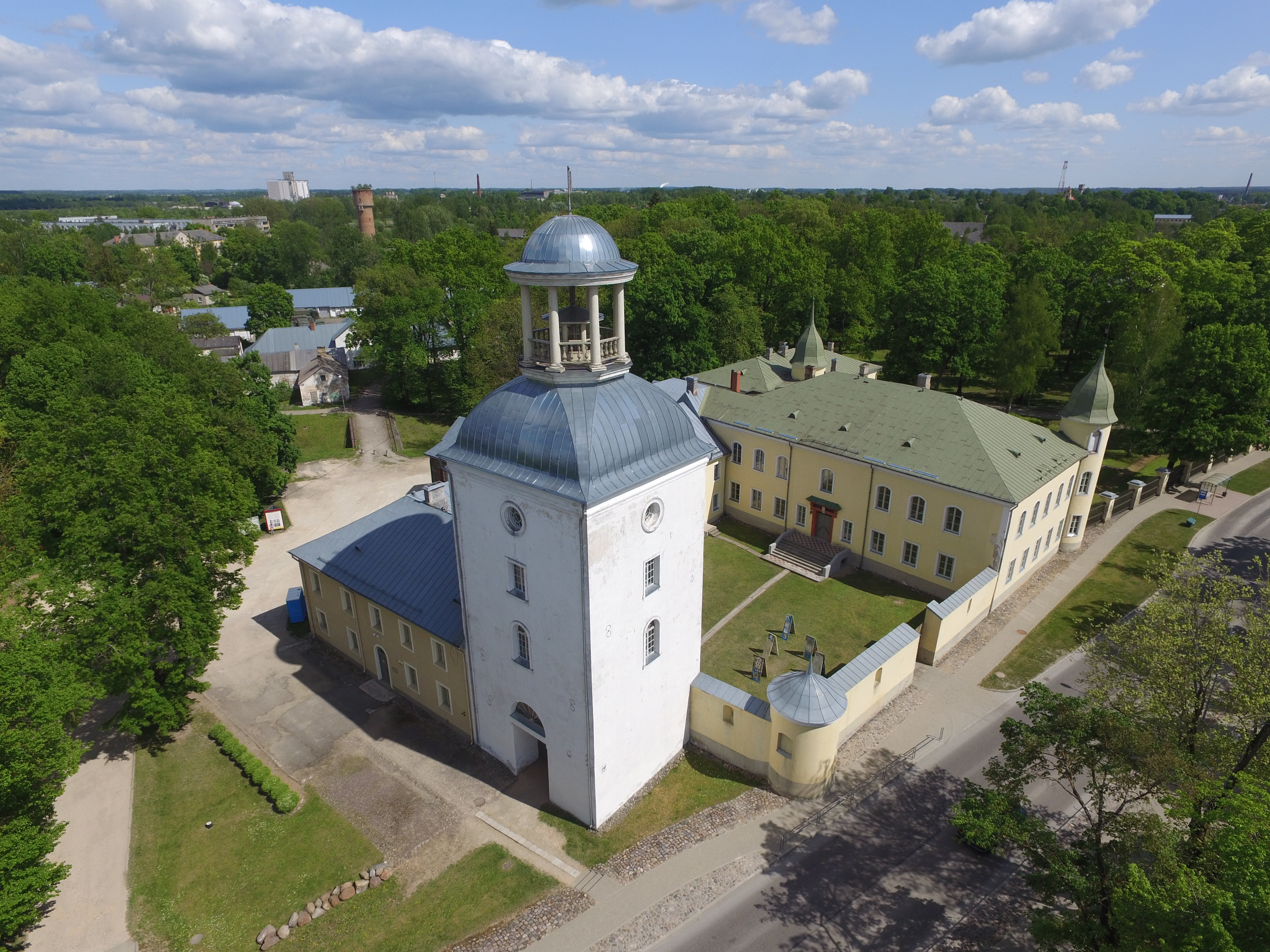
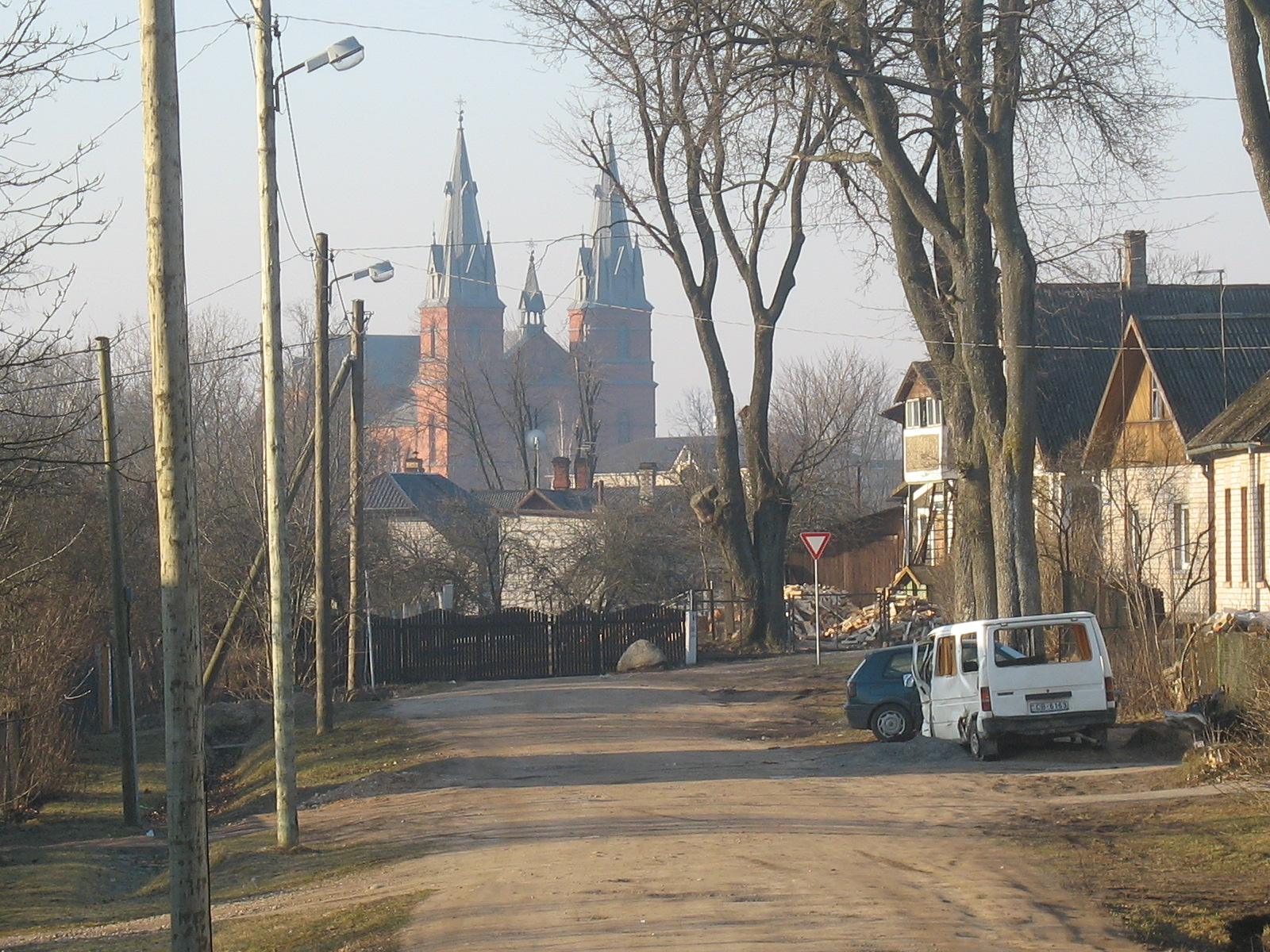
- Daugavpils the biggest city in region; Krustpils Castle; Rēzekne second largest city in region

- Flag Coat of arms

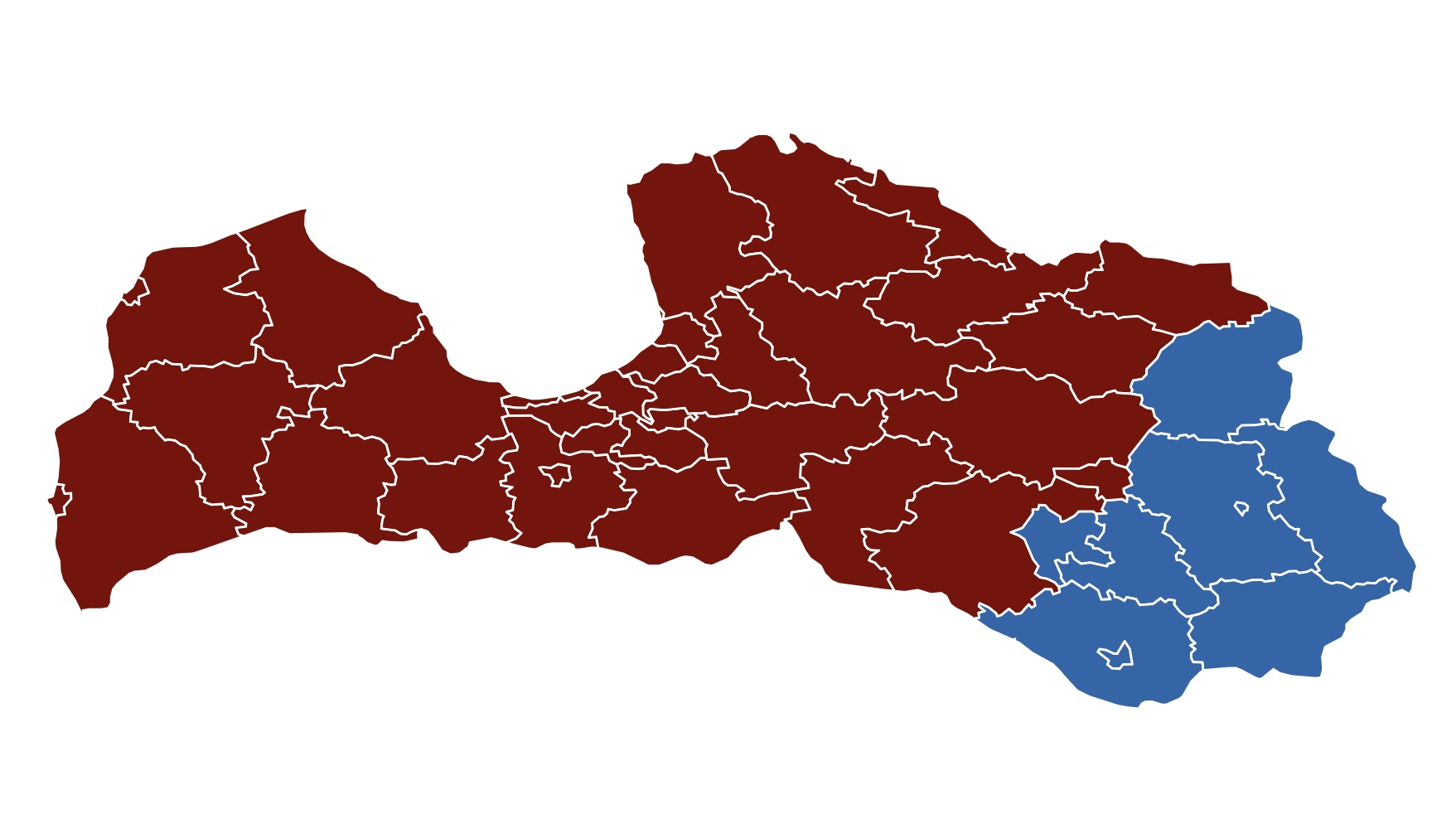
- Latgale Planning Region in blue
- Country: Latvia
- Largest city: Daugavpils

Area
  - Total: 14,549 km^{2} (5,617 sq mi)

Population (2020)
  - Total: 281,116
  - Density: 19.322/km^{2} (50.044/sq mi)

GDP
  - Total: €2.822 billion (2022)
  - Per capita: €11,536 (2023)
- HDI (2022): 0.846 very high · 6th
- Website: https://lpr.gov.lv/en

Latgale Planning Region (Latvian: Latgales plānošanas reģions) also known as Latgale Region (Latvian: Latgales reģions), is one of the five planning regions of Latvia, it is situated in the eastern part of Latvia. The state institution was founded on 2 October 2006, based on the creation of the region territory as prescribed by Regulations No. 133 of the Cabinet of Ministers as of 25 March 2003, the "Regulations on Territories of Planning Regions". As of 2020, the region's population was 281,116.

== Administrative divisions ==
Subdivision	Area km^{2}	Population	GDP	GDP per capita
Daugavpils	72	78,850	€858 million	€10,746
Rēzekne	18	26,378	€361 million	€13,540
Rēzekne Municipality	2,811	28,805	€194 million	€6,633
Augšdaugava Municipality	2,524	24,754	€144 million	€5,620
Krāslava Municipality	2,289	20,321	€145 million	€6,847
Ludza Municipality	2,411	21,257	€174 million	€8,093
Balvi Municipality	2,386	18,240	€117 million	€6,238
Preiļi Municipality	1,413	16,037	€131 million	€7,948
Līvāni Municipality	623	6,836	€149 million	€14,109
Latgale Planning Region	14,549	281,116	€2,206 million	€8,833

== See also ==
- Planning regions of Latvia
- Administrative divisions of Latvia
