= Zemgale Planning Region =

Planning and statistical region of Latvia

Zemgale Planning Region Zemgales plānošanas reģions
- Planning Region
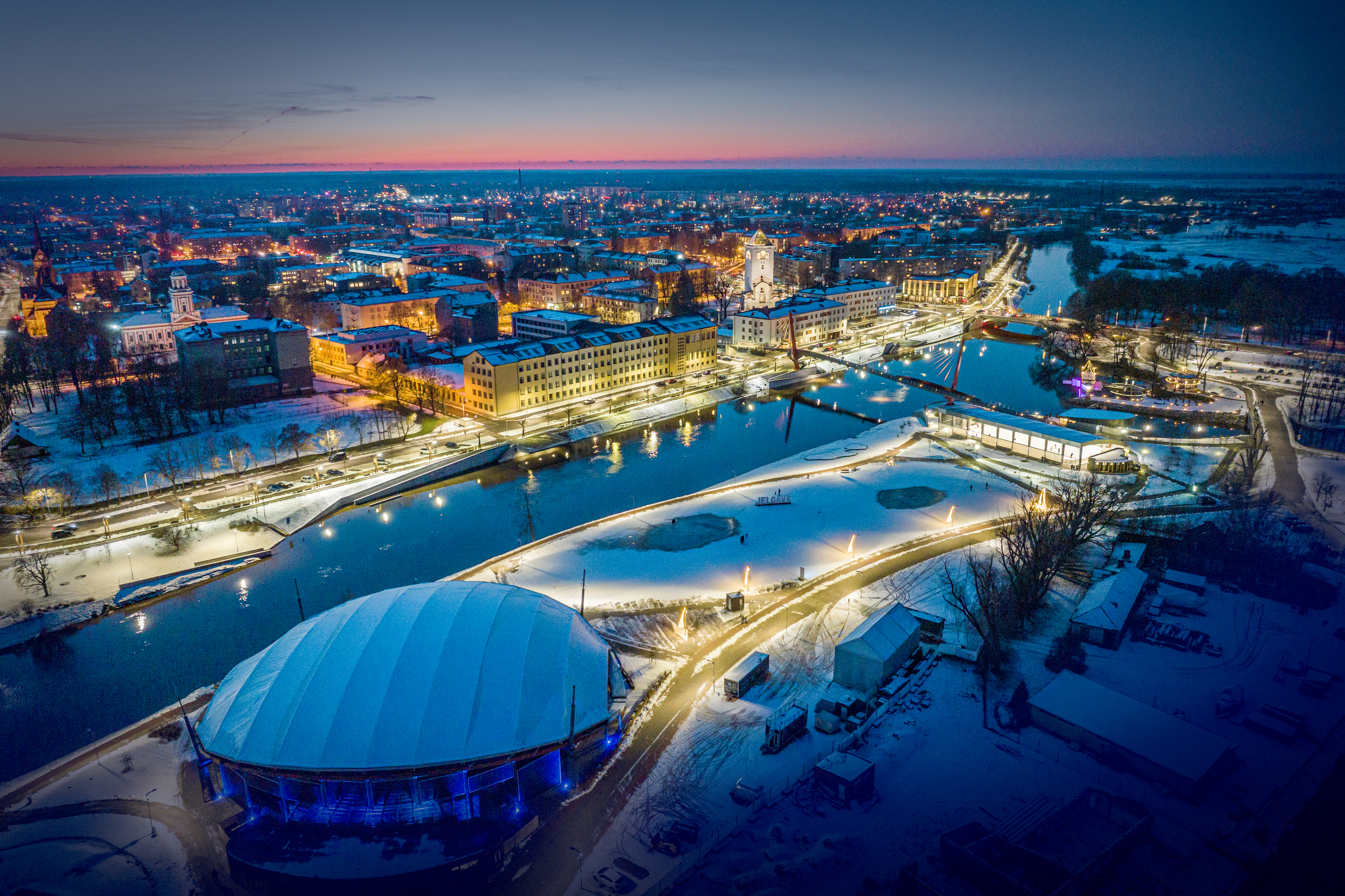
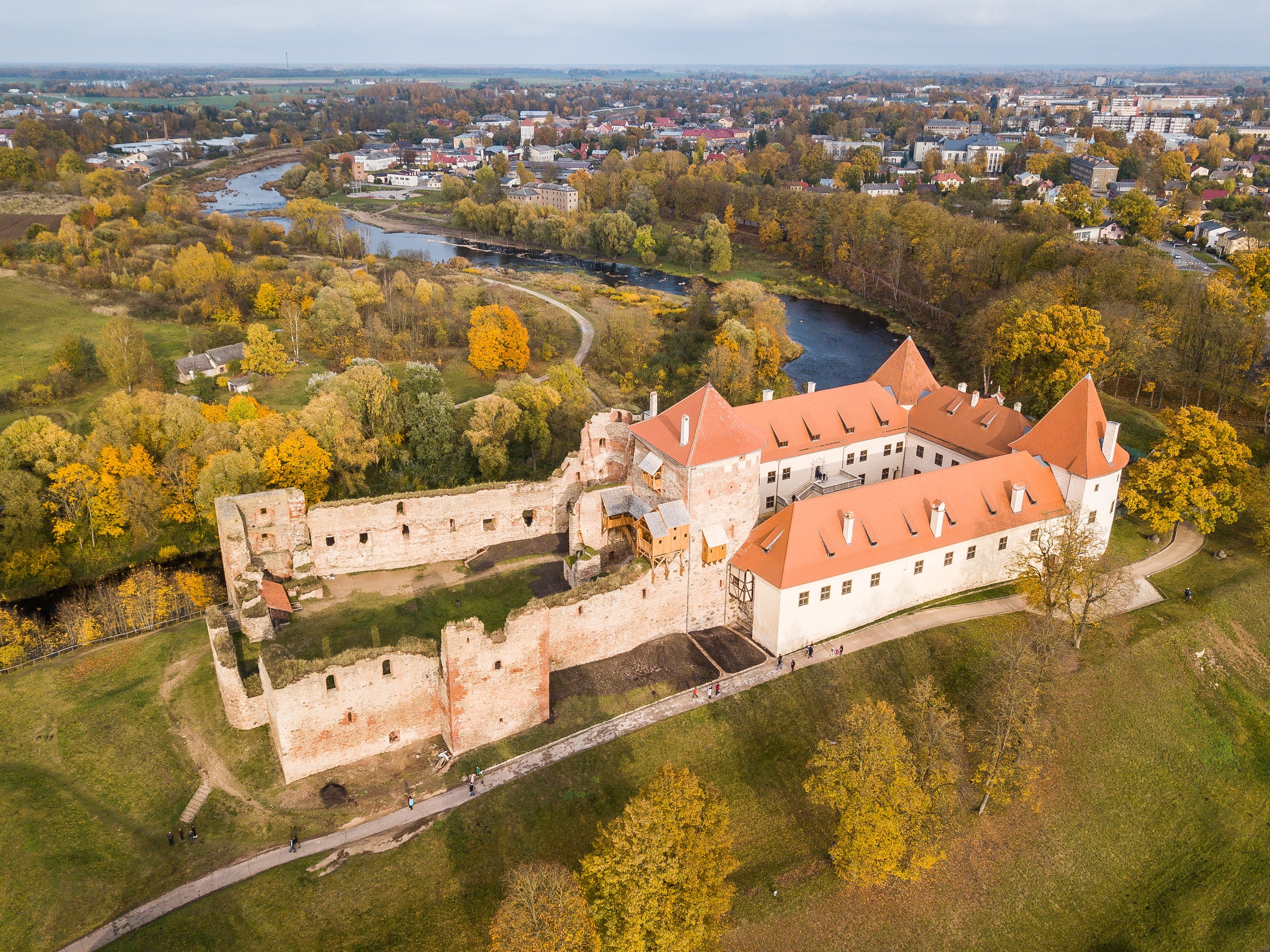
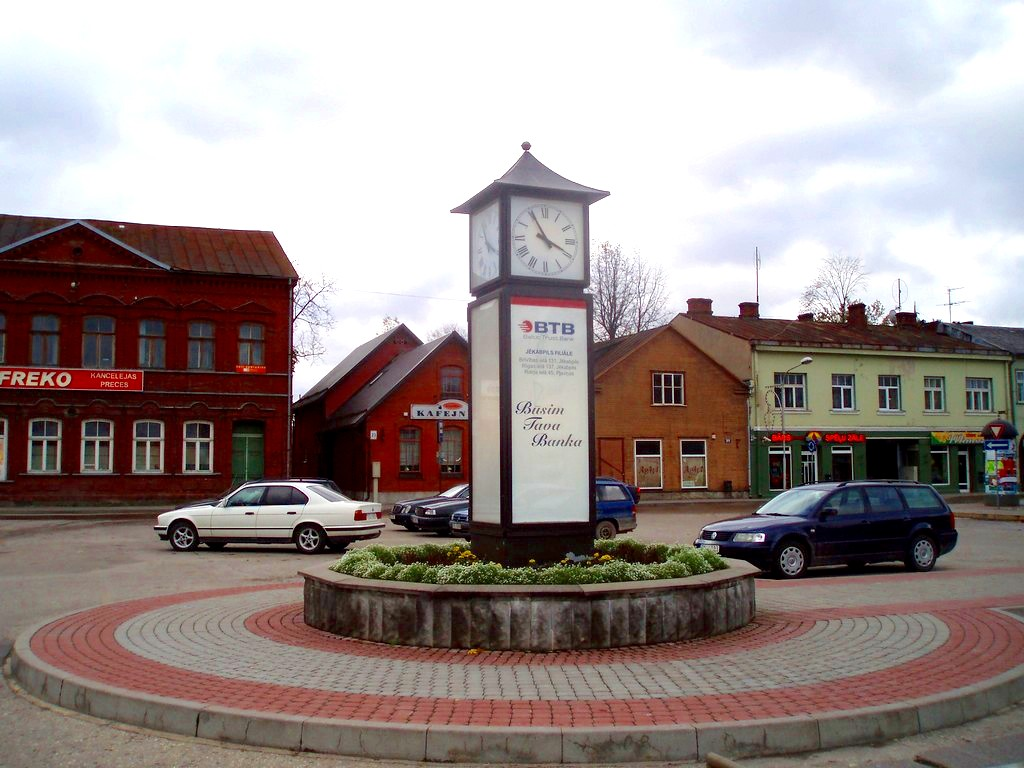
- Jelgava the biggest city in region; Bauska Castle; Jēkabpils second largest city in region

- Flag Coat of arms

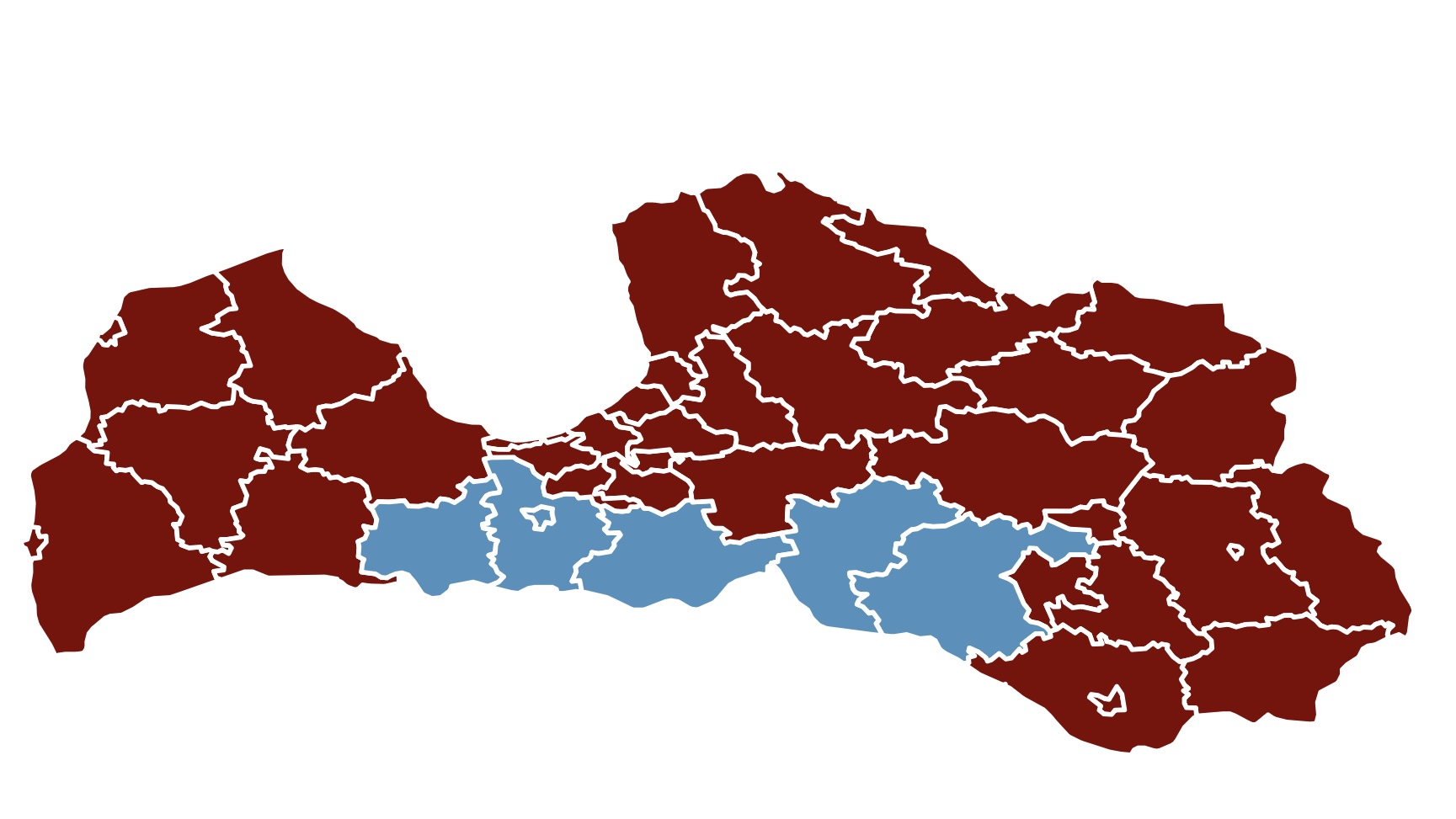
- Zemgale Planning Region in blue
- Coordinates: 56°30′0″N 23°30′0″E
- Country: Latvia
- Established: 2002
- Largest city: Jelgava

Area
  - Planning Region: 10,742 km^{2} (4,148 sq mi)
  - Urban: 645 km^{2} (249 sq mi)

Population (2022)
  - Planning Region: 225,017
  - Density: 26.11/km^{2} (67.6/sq mi)

GDP
  - Total: €2.904 billion (2022)
  - Per capita: €12,859 (2022)
- HDI (2022): 0.861 very high · 5th
- Website: zemgale.lv

Zemgale Planning Region (Latvian: Zemgales plānošanas reģions) is a planning region of Latvia located within the south-center of the country. Established in 2002, the planning region contains 22 municipalities: 20 local governments and two major cities, the largest being Jelgava. As of 2020, the region's population was 228,409.

== Geography ==
Zemgale is located within the historical region of Semigallia, which encompasses the southern-central portion of the country. The planning region has a total area of 10,742 km^{2} (4,148 mi^{2}), making up 16% of the nation's total territory. Zemgale shares a 270 km (170 mi) border with the Republic of Lithuania, which sits directly to its south.

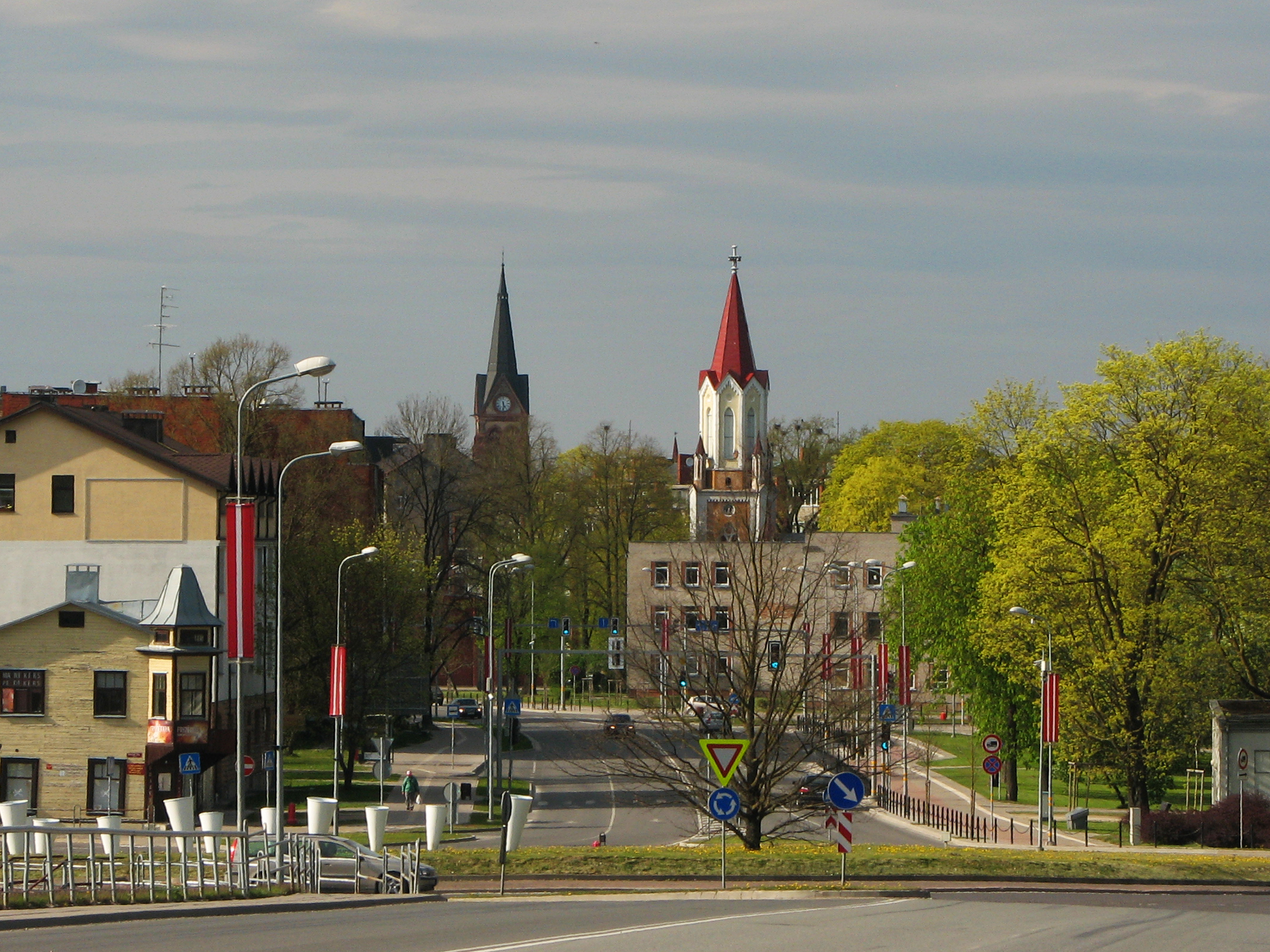
With a population of 62,800, Jelgava is the largest city in the planning region

Zemgale is noted for its rich soil, unpolluted resources, and natural areas; 40% of the region is forested.

== Administrative divisions ==
Subdivision	Area km^{2}	Population	GDP	GDP per capita
Jelgava	60	54,694	€740 million	€13,462
Bauska Municipality	2,175	41,392	€383 million	€9,228
Jēkabpils Municipality	2,996	39,984	€433 million	€10,753
Jelgava Municipality	1,604	31,899	€321 million	€10,071
Aizkraukle Municipality	2,274	29,055	€353 million	€12,095
Dobele Municipality	1,629	27,993	€361 million	€12,778
Zemgale Planning Region	10,739	225,017	€2,707 million	€11,974

== Demography ==
As of 2010, the region has a population of 280,494, which makes up 12.5% of Latvia's total population. About half of Zemgale's population lives in the region's two largest cities: Jelgava and Jēkabpils.
