= List of rivers of Latvia =

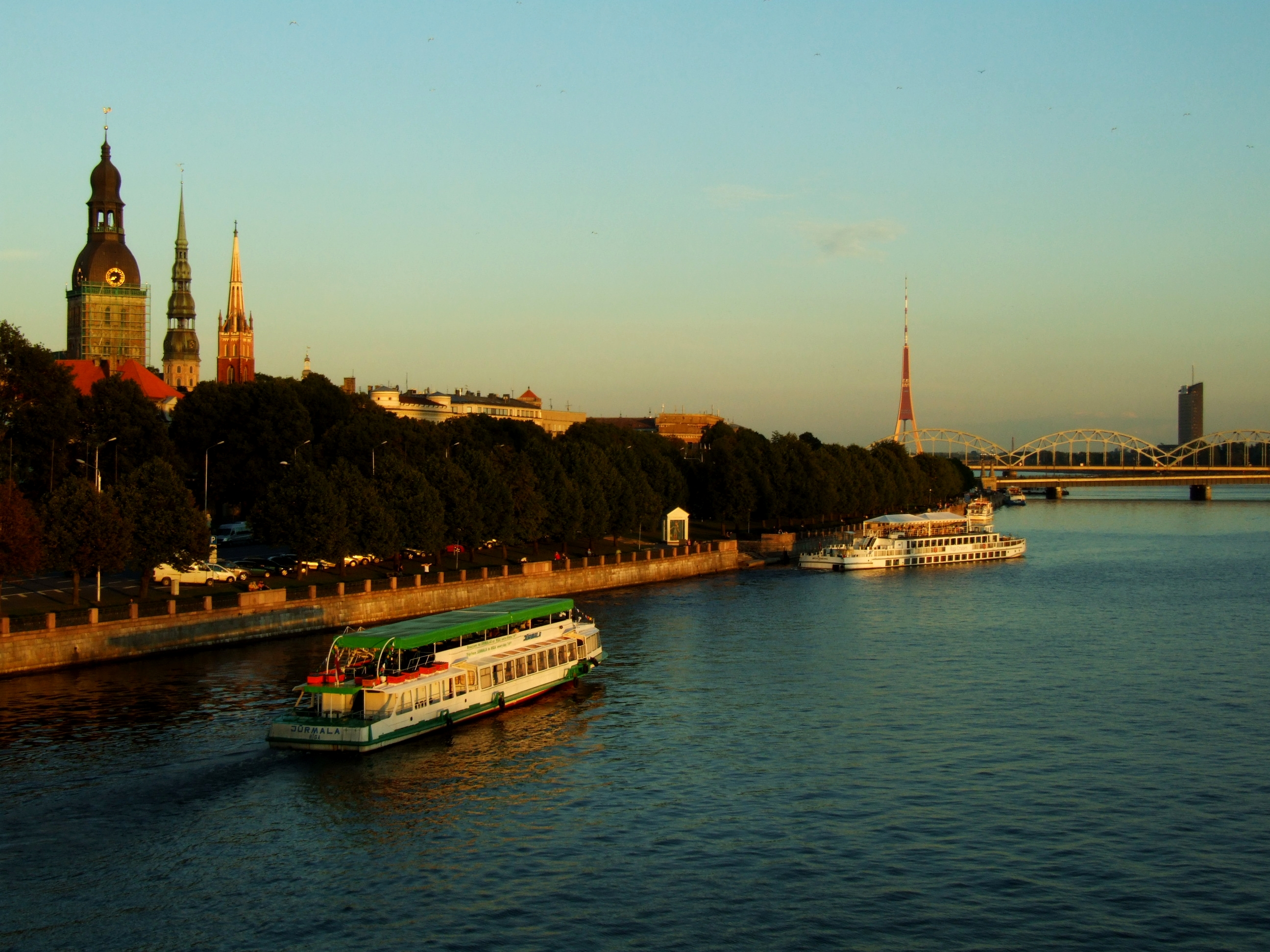
Daugava River flowing through Riga

Rivers of Latvia include:

== Longest rivers ==
Rivers over 100 km:

| Name | Length in Latvia (km) | Total length (km) | Basin (km^{2}) | Mouth |
|---|---|---|---|---|
| Gauja | 452 | 452 | 8,900 | Gulf of Riga |
| Daugava | 357 | 1,020 | 87,900 | Gulf of Riga |
| Ogre | 188 | 188 | 1,730 | Daugava |
| Venta | 176 | 346 | 11,800 | Baltic Sea |
| Iecava | 136 | 136 | 1,166 | Lielupe |
| Pededze | 131 | 159 | 1,690 | Aiviekste |
| Abava | 129 | 129 | 2,042 | Venta |
| Lielupe | 119 | 119 | 17,600 | Gulf of Riga |
| Rēzekne | 116 | 116 | 2,066 | Aiviekste |
| Mēmele | 115 | 191 | 4,050 | Lielupe |
| Aiviekste | 114 | 114 | 9,300 | Daugava |
| Bērze | 109 | 109 | 915 | Svēte |
| Dubna | 105 | 105 | 2,780 | Daugava |

== List of rivers ==
=== A ===
Abava - Acupīte - Aiviekste - Amata - Ataša

=== B ===
Bārta - Bērze - Buļļupe

=== C ===
Cena - Ceraukste

=== D ===
Dārzupīte - Daugava - Dienvidsusēja - Donaviņa - Dubna - Dvina

=== E ===
Engure - Eleja (river)

=== F ===
Feimanka

=== G ===
Gauja

=== H ===
Hapaka

=== I ===
Iecava - Irbe River

=== J ===
- Jugla River
- Jumara (river) (Estonian: Ümera), length of about 15 km

=== K ===
Krievupe - Kūkova - Kurjanka

=== L ===
Langa - Lielā Jugla - Lielupe - Liepupe - Lašupe - Lošupe - Ludza

=== M ===
Malta - Mārupīte - Mazā Daugava - Mazā Jugla - Mēmele - Mergupe - Mīlgrāvis (canal) - Misa - Mūsa

=== N ===
Neretiņa

=== O ===
Odze - Ogre - Omuļupe

=== P ===
Pededze - Pedele - Pernovka - Pietēnupe - Piķurga - Pilsētas kanāls - Platone - Plisunka

=== R ===
Rauna River - Reiu - Rēzekne - Riežupe - Rītupe - Rūbeža - Rogāļu strauts - Rūja

=== S ===
Saka River - Salaca - Slocene - Stende - Strazdupīte - Suda - Sventāja - Svēte

=== T ===
Tartaks - Tebra - Tumšupe

=== V ===
Varkaļu kanāls - Venta - Vēršupīte

=== Z ===
Zilupe
