= Vārkava Manor =

Manor house in Latvia

- Latgale, Latvia
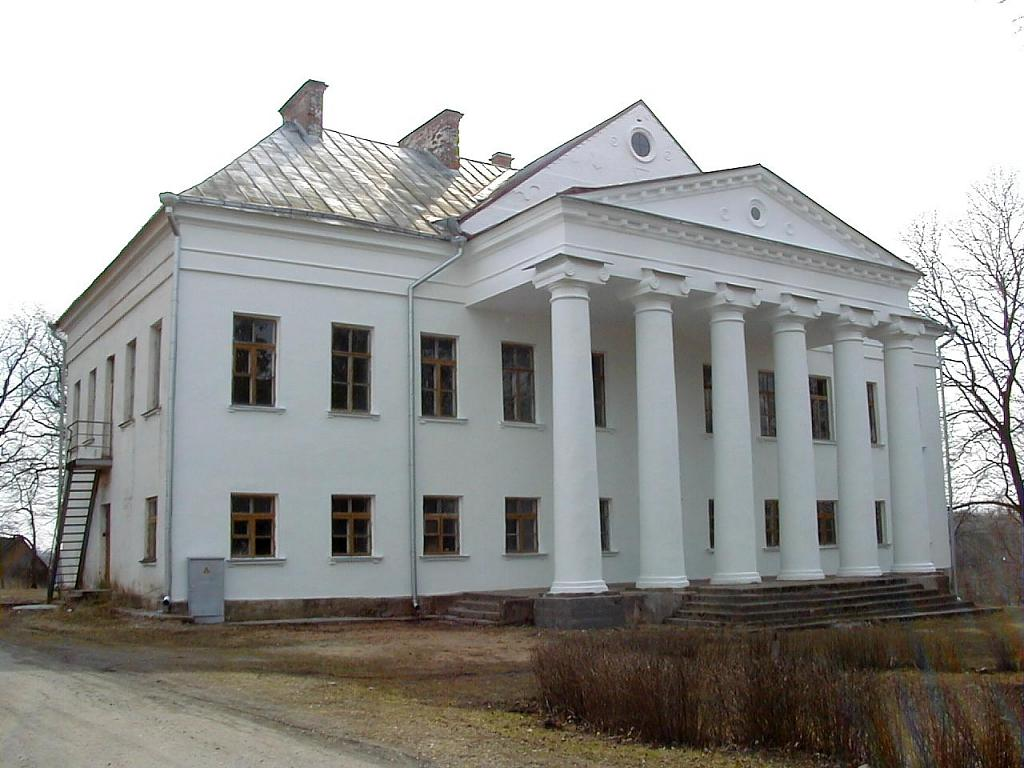

Site information
- Type: Manor

Location
- Location within Latvia
- Coordinates: 56°11′47.1″N 26°30′51.3″E

Vārkava Manor is a manor in Vecvārkava, in the Upmala Parish of Preiļi Municipality in the Latgale region of Latvia. The main building of Vārkava Manor is on the list of State protected real estate monuments.

== History ==
Vārkava estate was mentioned in 1583, as belonging to Rezekne. In the 16th century in this locality a manor house was built (Latvian: foļvarka) – a place, where traders came to buy various items for the Polish king and deliver them via local waterways - the Dubna river and Daugava river - to Riga. It is not known exactly when a brick manor house was built. It is known however that the old manor house burned down, and afterwards at some point in the second half of 19th century, the new brick building was erected which stands until today.

In 1912 the millionaire Dorimedonts Aļeiņikovs (1866-1918) made substantial investments into Vārkava estate. He installed electricity, running water, built mills, and acquired the most modern farm machinery. He also had plans to build a railway connecting the stations of Nīcgale and Aglona. These plans were never realised due to the outbreak of World War I. In 1918 the manor was looted and destroyed by Bolshevik revolutionaries. Dorimedonts Aļeiņikovs was shaken by these events. He got ill and died soon afterwards. In 1920 in course of the Latvian agrarian reform, the manor was nationalised. In 1922 Vārkava's Primary school moved into the manor house. The primary school eventually became a high school which occupied the manor house until 1979. Then the building was converted into apartments and was also still used as a storage facility for the school.

In 2000-2004 Vārkava manor underwent an extensive restoration and in 2004 it was opened for public use. Nowadays the building houses the municipality administration of Vārkava, Upmala library, Vārkava municipality Culture center and a family doctor's practice. The main building of Vārkava Manor is on the list of State protected real estate monuments. The surrounding manor park is also protected as a natural monument.

== See also ==
- List of palaces and manor houses in Latvia
