= Malta (river) =

River in Latvia

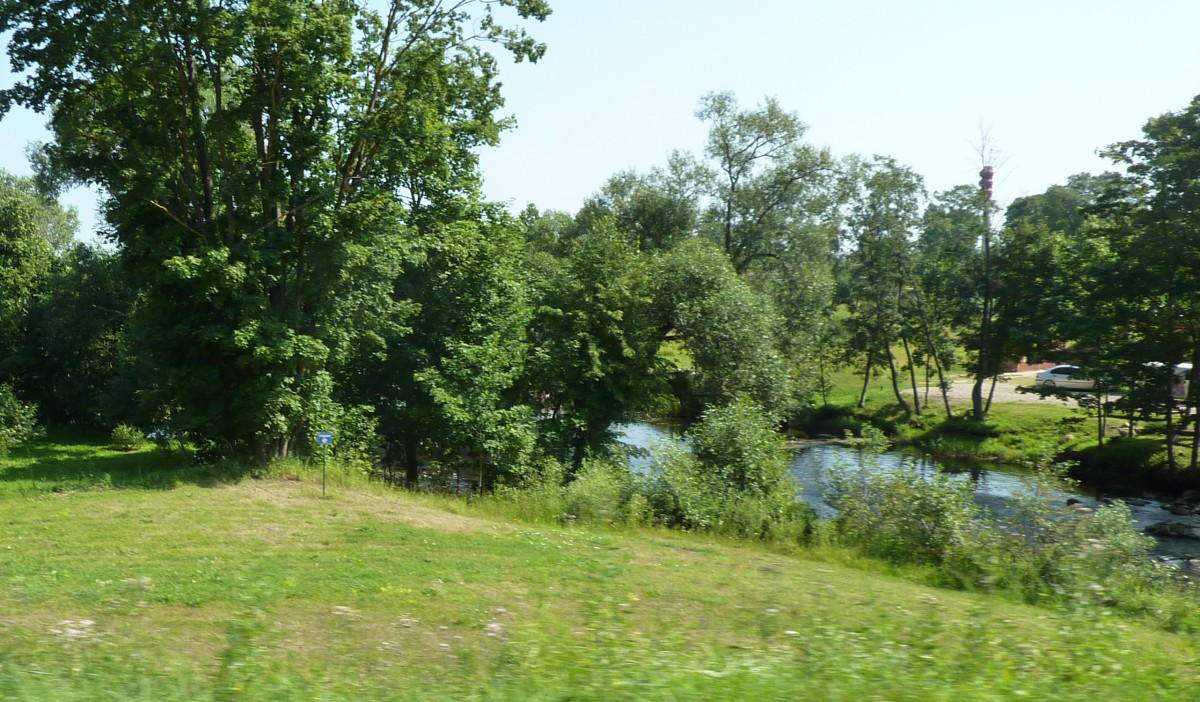

Location
- Country: Latvia

Physical characteristics
- Source
  - coordinates: 56°12′36″N 27°22′51″E
- Mouth: Lake Lubāns
  - coordinates: 56.7229°N 26.9917°E
- Length: 105 km (65 mi)

Basin features
- Progression: Rēzekne→ Lake Lubāns→ Aiviekste→ Daugava→ Baltic Sea

The Malta is a river in Latvia. The 105 km long river discharges into the Rēzekne, which in turn feeds Lake Lubāns, the largest lake in the country.

== See also ==
- List of rivers of Latvia
