= Bērze =

River in Latvia

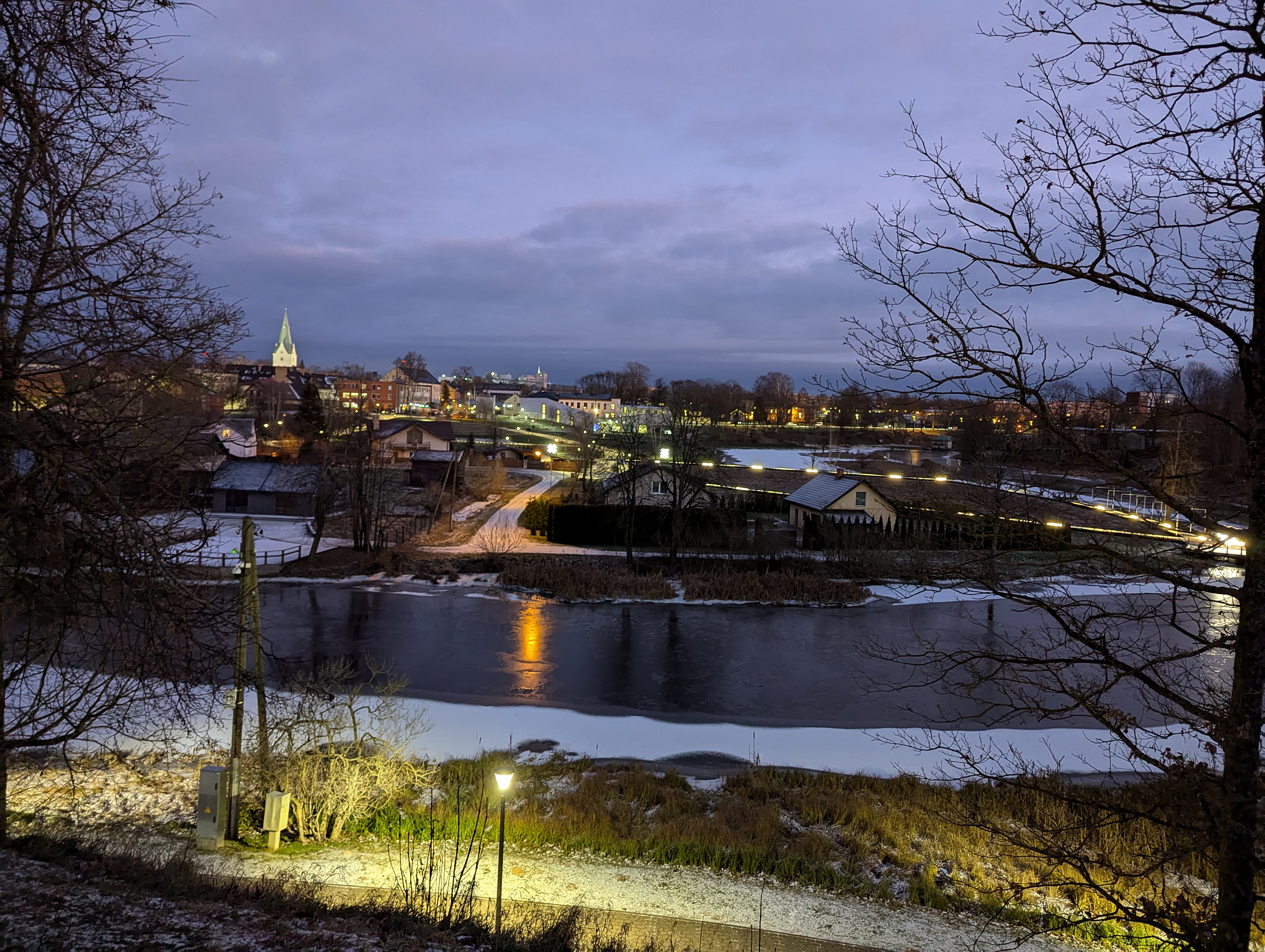
- Bērze in the Dobele town.

Location
- Country: Lithuania, Latvia

Physical characteristics
- Mouth: Svēte
  - coordinates: 56.6797°N 23.6128°E
- Length: 107 km (66 mi)

Basin features
- Progression: Svēte→ Lielupe→ Baltic Sea

The Bērze is a river of Latvia. It flows for 107 kilometres before emptying into the Svēte. Major tributaries include the Bikstupe, Sesava, Ālav, Līčupe, Līčupe and Gardene. Major settlements along the river include Zebrene, Biksti, Kaķenieki, Annenieki, Dobele, Bērze, Līvbērze. The river has a total drainage area of 872 square kilometers.

== See also ==
- List of rivers of Latvia
