= Kirikumäe Landscape Conservation Area =

Protected area in Estonia

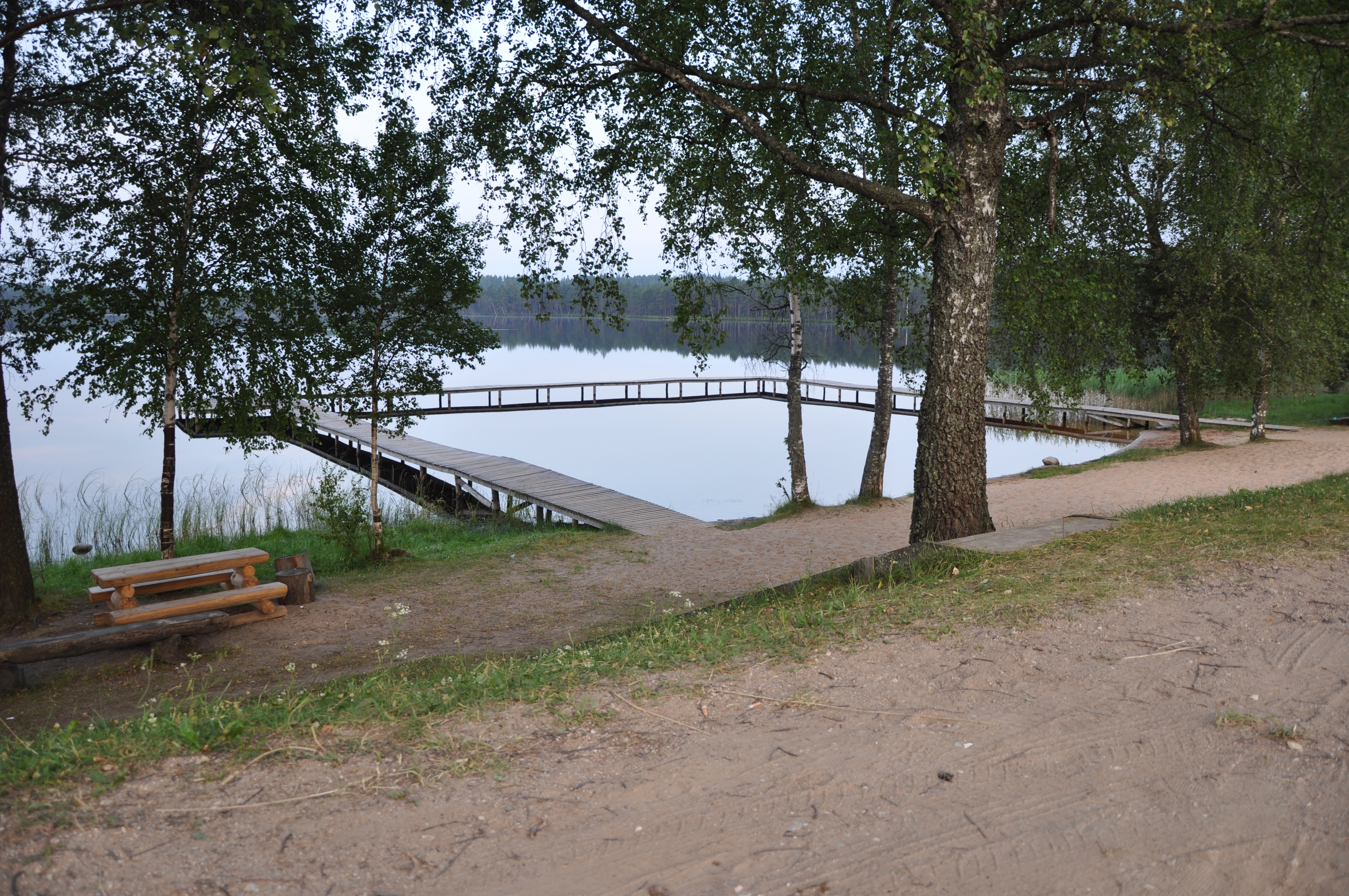
- Lake Kirikumäe

- Location within Estonia
- Location: Estonia
- Coordinates: 57°41′N 27°15′E
- Area: 362 ha (890 acres)
- Established: 1983 (2016)

Kirikumäe Landscape Conservation Area is a nature park situated in Võru County, Estonia.

Its area is 362 ha.

The protected area was designated in 1983 to protect Lake Kirikumäe and its surrounding areas. In 2000, the protected area was redesigned to the landscape conservation area.
