= Arendole Manor =

Manor in Latvia

- Latgale, Latvia
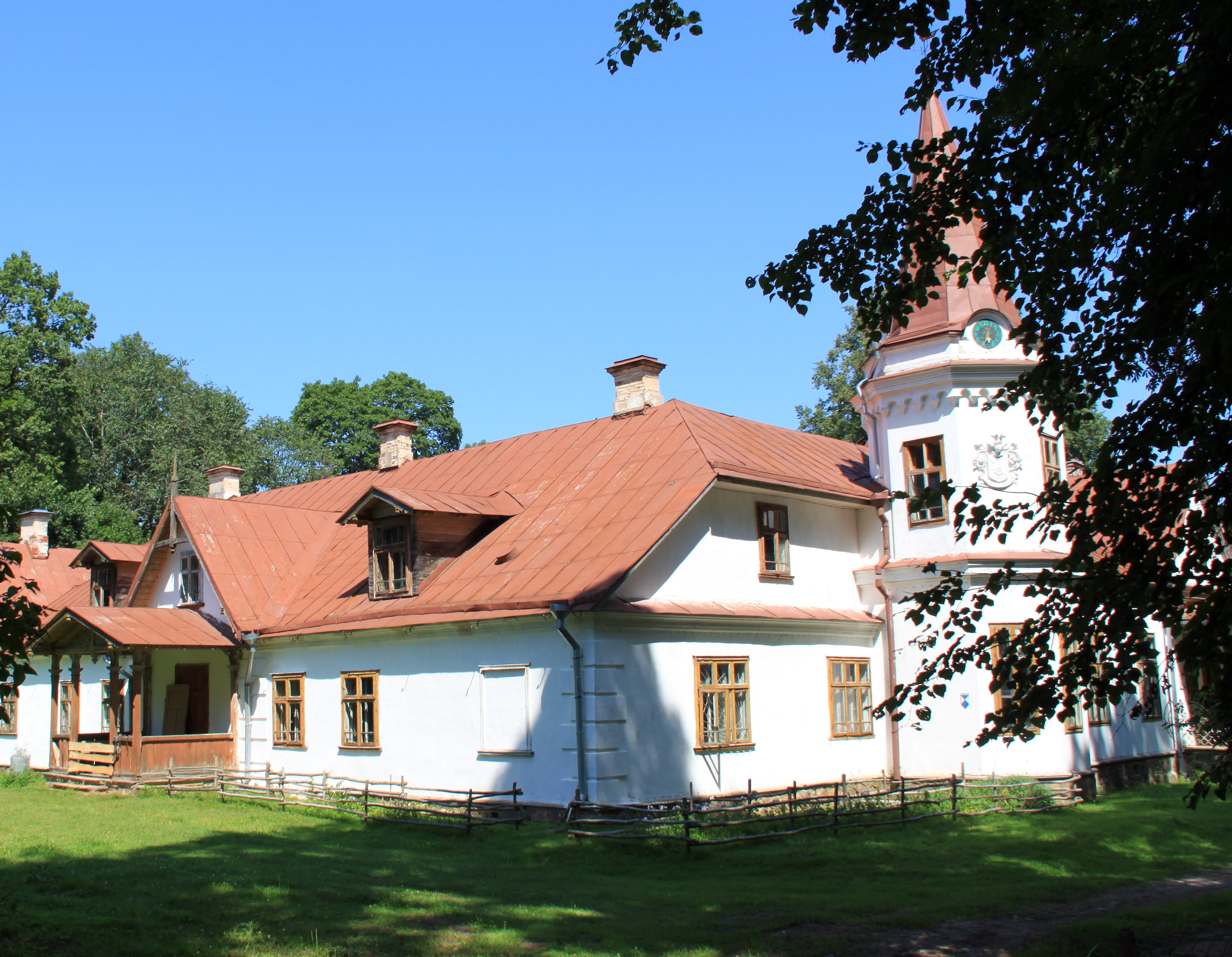

Site information
- Type: Manor

Location
- Coordinates: 56°09′05″N 26°36′40″E

Arendole Manor (Latvian: Arendoles muiža) is a manor in Rožkalni Parish, Preiļi Municipality in the historical region of Latgale, in Latvia.

== History ==
Arendole Manor dates back to the 16th century, first belonging to the Grappenbruck, then in 1772 to Wolff. The manor complex was then used as a hunting castle, belonging to the Plater-Zyberk until the transfer. In 1895, Arendolest, once lost as an independent possession, once again became a manor. Like the hunting castle, the manor included 500 hectares of agricultural land and 5,000 hectares of forest.

During World War I, the manor initially housed Russian troops. During stay troops burned down the wood chapel built in 1779 in manor park. In 1918 German soldiers wintered there, using the manor furniture, windows and doors for heating. Finally in 1919 the manor was expropriated.

The main building of the manor was completed at the beginning of the 19th century and was originally built as a hunting castle for the Plater family. Today it is privately owned and restored. The outbuildings of the manor were completed after 1895 and there were a total of 27 of them. Several of them have survived, including the granary where Arendole Primary School is presently located. More than a hundred years old park is adorned with a two-story tower of red brick. Stone barn has partially collapsed. The manor complex also includes the Arendo Catholic Church.

== See also ==
- List of palaces and manor houses in Latvia
