= Vilce Nature Park =

Protected area in Latvia

- IUCN category II (national park)

- Location within Latvia
- Location: Latvia, Zemgale
- Coordinates: 56°25′19″N 23°32′45″E
- Area: 144 ha (360 acres)
- Established: 2004

Nature Park "Vilce" is a specially protected nature territory Jelgava Municipality in Vilce Parish. Located in the lower reaches of the Vilces valley at its mouth Svētē. The protected area was established in 2004 to uniformly protect natural values, including river valleys, slope and ravine forests, sandstone outcrops, rare and protected plant species, and Vilce castle mound.

There are 8 protected cultural and historical monuments in the territory of the nature park. Natura 2000 site.
