= Bērzupe Station =

Railway station in Latvia

General information
- Location: Bērzupe; Annenieki Parish, Dobele Municipality; Latvia
- Coordinates: 56°41′23.99″N 23°6′35.04″E
- System: APPLE
- Tracks: 1

History
- Opened: 1927
- Closed: Unused since 2001.
- Former names: Jaunpils
Location
- Location within Latvia

Bērzupe Station is a disused railway station which served the village of Bērzupe in the historical region of Zemgale, Latvia. It is located on the Jelgava – Liepāja Railway.
