= Anspoku Manor =

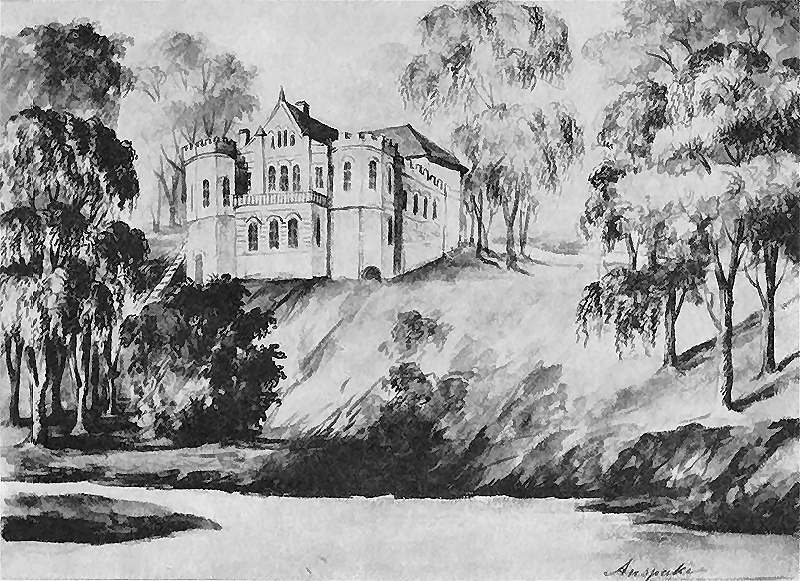
- Watercolor by Napoleon Orda (1875)
- Interactive map of the Anspoku Manor area

General information
- Coordinates: 56°16′13″N 26°45′24″E

Anspoku Manor or Anspaku Hunting Lodge was a manor house on the banks of the Preiļupe River in the village of Anspoku, Preiļu Parish, Latvia. Today, only ruins of the building remain.

== History ==
The hunting lodge was built between 1860 and 1865 in the Neo-Gothic style, remodeling another building that was located on the same site. The construction of the building was commissioned by the owner of the Preiļu Manor, Mihails Jozefs fon der Borhs. The palace was noted as a significant architectural monument by 19th-century historian Gustavs Manteifelis.

In 1891, the Preiļu Manor was purchased by Konstantīns Guļkevičs, who sold Anspoku Manor to its administrator Justīns Volonts due to large debts. J. Volonts' estate was well maintained, thus it was recommended as a sightseeing object for travelers. The forested area had an established park, gardens, and a large herd of livestock. A dairy was established on the site of the former Anspoku tavern, along with an ice cellar.

In 1927, J. Volonts built a new residence for himself, but Anspoku Palace was transferred for use by the Plotiņi (later Šaurupe) Primary School, which utilized the building for educational purposes until the 1970s.

After the Soviet occupation in 1940, the Volonts family was expelled from their home and lived in Vanagi House in Līvāni Parish. After the June 14, 1941 deportations, he perished in the Vjatlag camp. The Volonts children fled to the United States in 1944. After the Restoration of Independence of Latvia, the Volonts returned to Latvia and reclaimed their family property.

== Description ==
The hunting lodge was built in two stories, in a T-shape, and it was topped with a gable roof. The sides of the building were complemented by symmetrical sections, which included partially protruding octagonal two-story towers with eaves, while between the towers was a single-story extension with a roof terrace. The window frames were characterized by a semi-circular upper part, surrounded by archivolts. Such architectural solutions in the Neo-Gothic style were very rare in manor houses of that time—not only in Latgale but throughout Latvia.

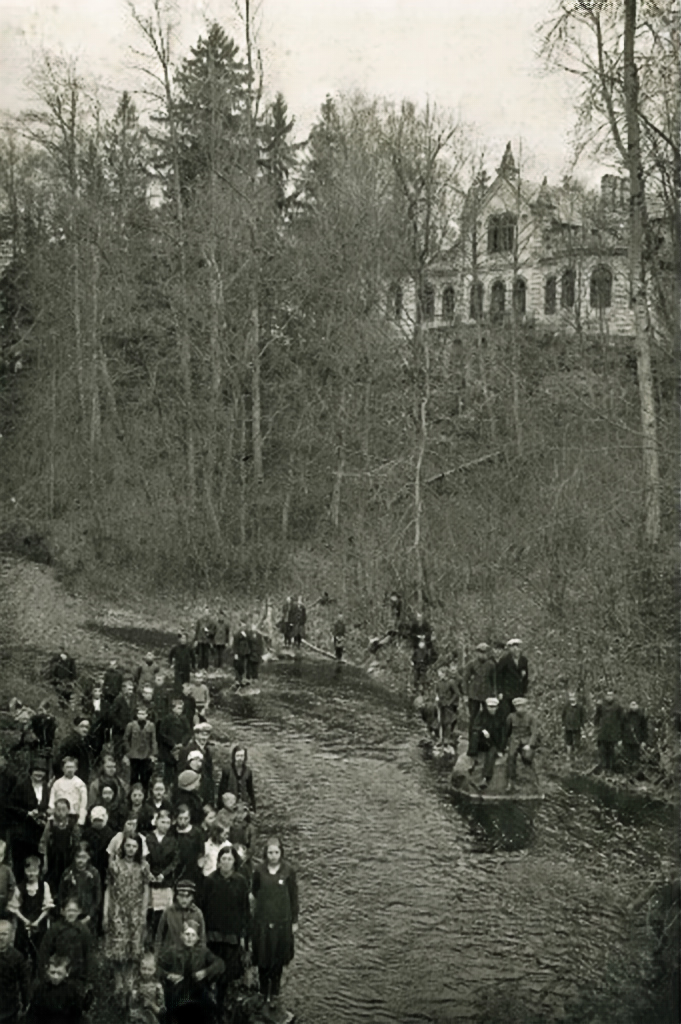
Anspoku Palace building with students (1920s)
