= Preiļupe =

River in Latvia

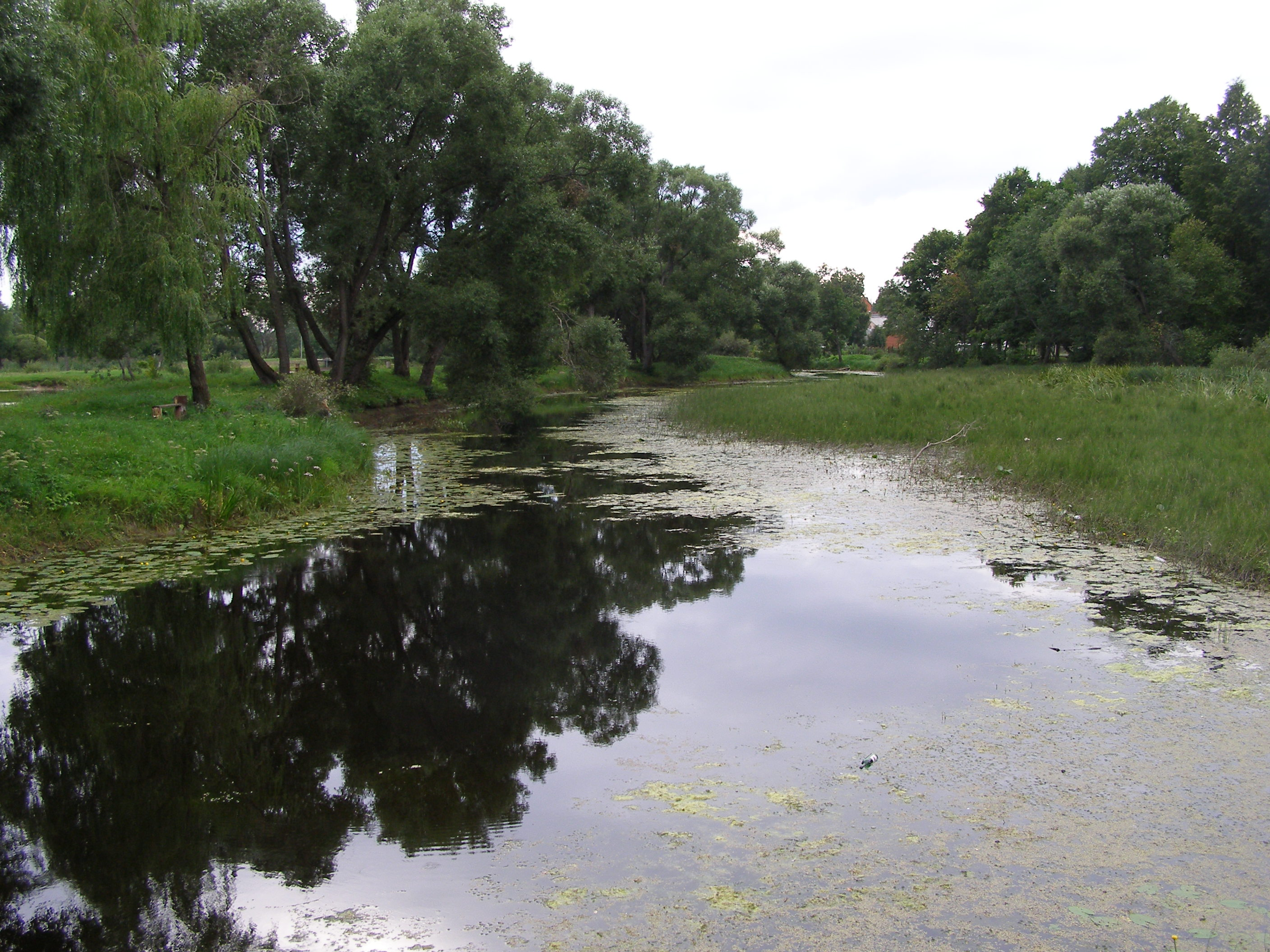
- The Preiļupe near Preiļi

Location
- Country: Latvia

Physical characteristics
- Source: Salmejs Lake
  - coordinates: 56°17′29″N 26°51′58″E
- Mouth: Feimanka
  - coordinates: 56.2826°N 26.6350°E
- Length: 19 km (12 mi)

Basin features
- Progression: Feimanka→ Dubna→ Daugava→ Baltic Sea

The Preiļupe (Polish: Prelka) is a stream in Latvia (Latgale) in Riebinu, Preiļu and Vārkava municipalities. It is 19 kilometres (12 mi) long and a left tributary of the river Feimanka. Its source is Salmejs Lake, from which it flows westward, through the city of Preili, and then into the Feimanka in the area of Škilteri. Its estimated terrain elevation is 124 metres above sea level.
