= Vārkava Municipality =

Municipality of Latvia

Coordinates: 56°16′30″N 26°39′30″E

Vārkava Municipality Vārkavas novads
- Municipality
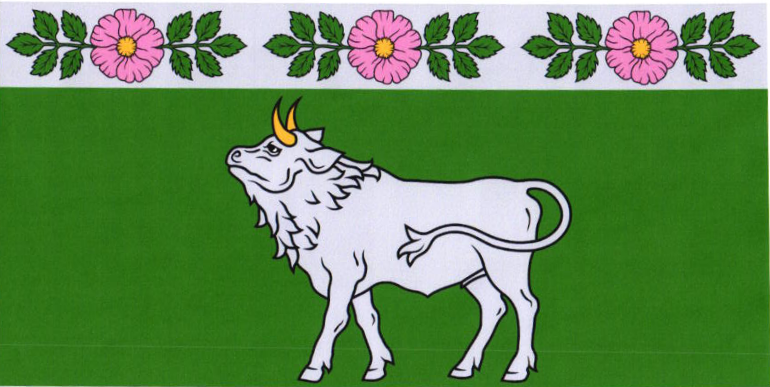
- Flag Coat of arms

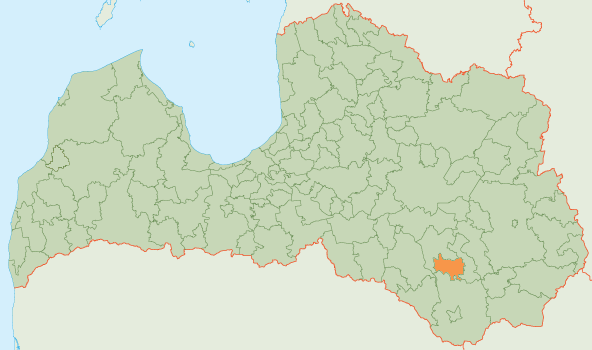
- Country: Latvia
- Formed: 2002
- Centre: Vecvārkava

Government
  - Council Chair: Anita Brakovska (Our Time)

Area
  - Total: 287.73 km^{2} (111.09 sq mi)
  - Land: 280.48 km^{2} (108.29 sq mi)
  - Water: 7.25 km^{2} (2.80 sq mi)

Population (2021)
  - Total: 1,754
  - Density: 6.254/km^{2} (16.20/sq mi)
- Website: www.varkava.lv

Vārkava Municipality (Latvian: Vārkavas novads) is a former municipality in Latgale, Latvia. The municipality was formed in 2002 by merging Rožkalni Parish and Upmala Parish. In 2009, it absorbed Vārkava Parish, also with the administrative centre being Vecvārkava. The population in 2020 was 1,793.

On 1 July 2021, Vārkava Municipality ceased to exist, and its territory was merged into Preiļi Municipality.

== See also ==
- Administrative divisions of Latvia (2009)
