= Ogre (river) =

River in Latvia

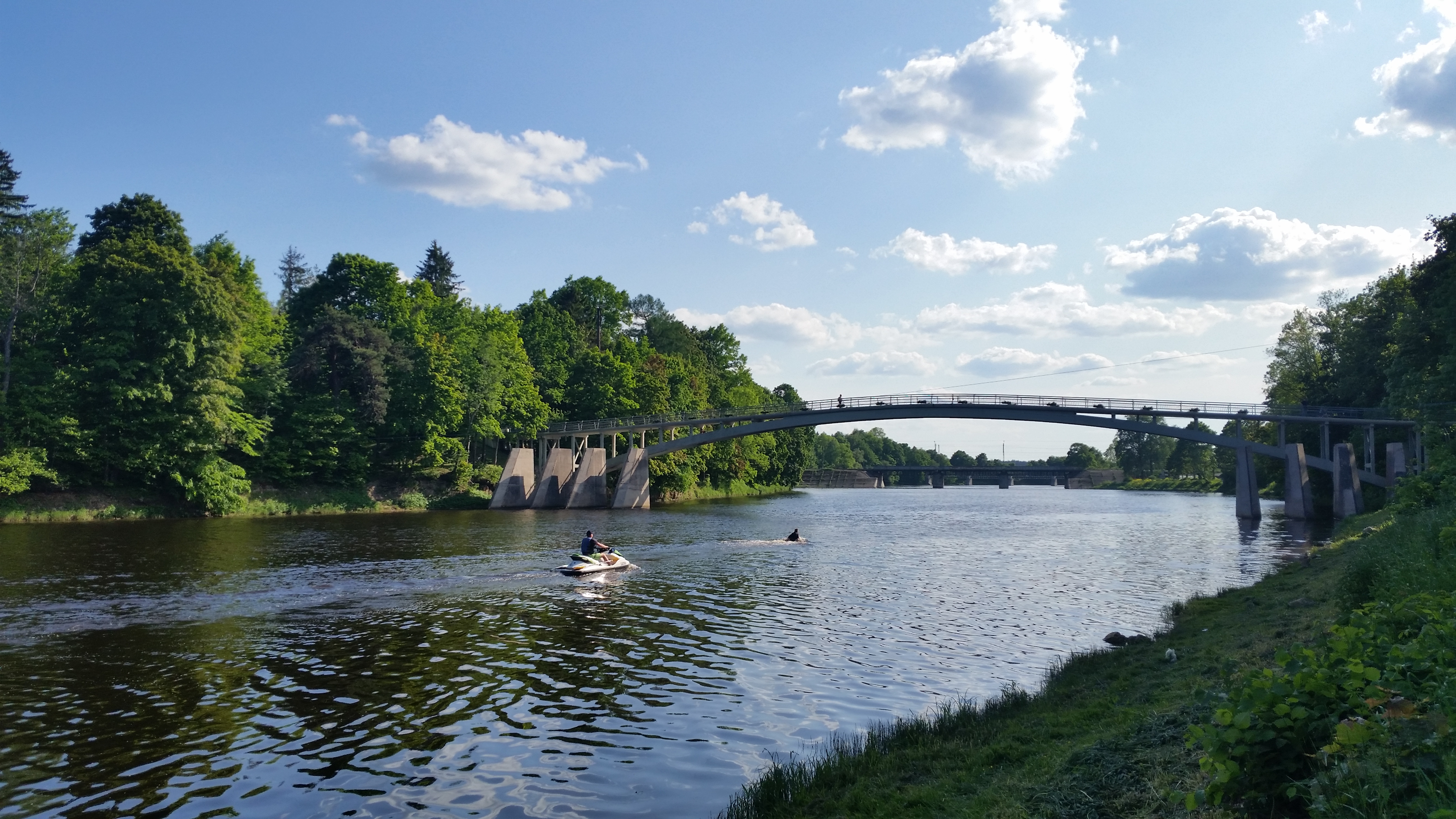
- Ogre river in Ogre city.

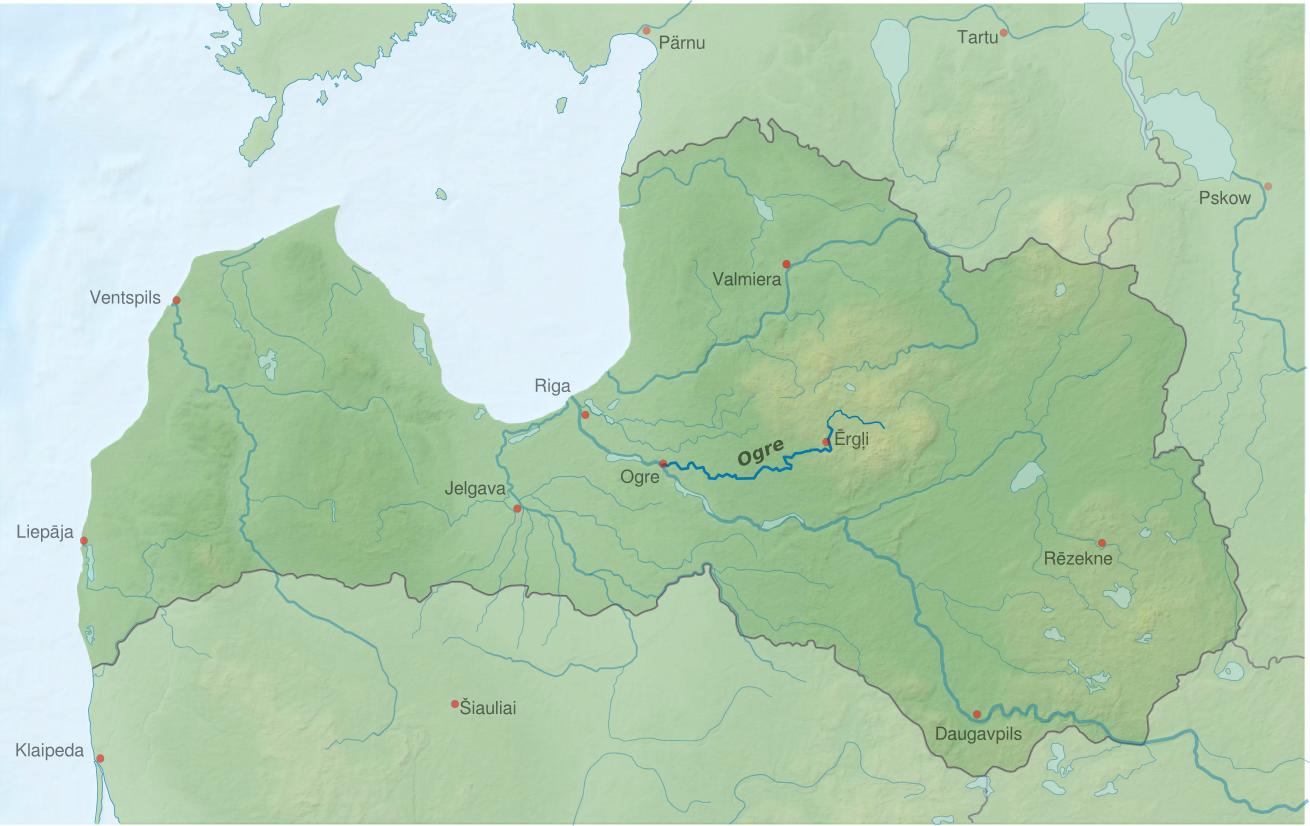

- Latvia

Location
- Country: Latvia

Physical characteristics
- Source
  - location: Sivēniņš lake in Liezēre parish
  - elevation: 222 m (728 ft)
- Mouth: Daugava
  - location: Ogre
  - coordinates: 56.8108°N 24.6017°E
- Length: 188 km (117 mi)
- Basin size: 1,730 km^{2} (670 sq mi)

Basin features
- Progression: Daugava→ Baltic Sea
- Tributaries
  - left: Lobe
  - right: Līčupe, Ranka

The Ogre is a river in Latvia. The 188 kilometers long Ogre is a right tributary of the river Daugava. In the 13th century, the Ogre was called Wogen or Woga.

== Etymology ==
There are three main versions of the etymology of Ogre's name (both town and river). According to the first, the name of the river from which this city derives its name is of Russian origin (угри, ugri, meaning "eels") because there used to be many eels in the river Ogre. A popular folk legend says that Catherine the Great of Russia was the one who gave the river this name because of the abundance of eels in the river; however, this version lacks any evidence. Whereas Estonian linguist Paul Alvre takes into consideration an older form of the Ogre river's name (Wogene, Woga) first found in Livonian Chronicle of Henry (1180–1227), and argues that it is cognate with Estonian word voog (with possible meanings: "stream, flow, waves"), therefore showing connection with Finno-Ugric languages, most probably early Livonian language.

A third etymology gives a reconstructed form *Vingrē, related to Lithuanian vingrùs, "meandering, curly" or Latvian vingrs, "nimble;" thus meaning "the meandering river"; the village of Engure has the same root.

== See also ==
- List of rivers of Latvia
