= Rēzekne (river) =

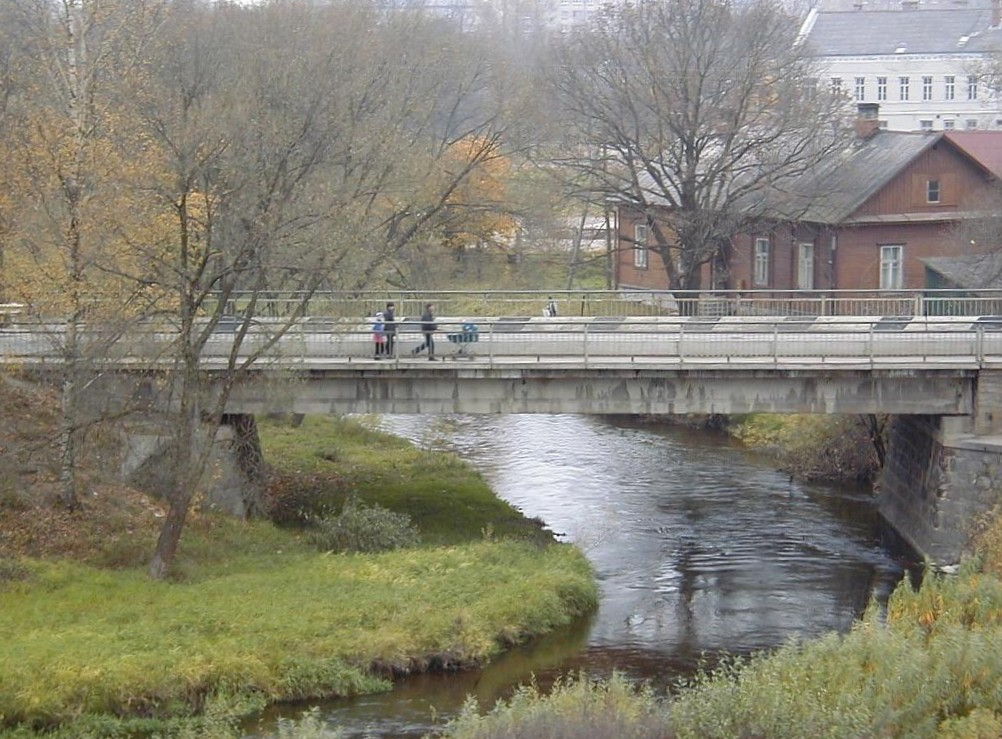
- Bridge over the Rēzekne in the town of Rēzekne

Location
- Country: Latvia

Physical characteristics
- Source
  - elevation: 163.3 m (536 ft)
- Mouth: Lake Lubāns
  - coordinates: 56°46′33″N 26°56′19″E
  - elevation: 92.1 m (302 ft)
- Length: 116 km (72 mi)
- Basin size: 2,025.7 km^{2} (782.1 sq mi)

Basin features
- Progression: Lake Lubāns→ Aiviekste→ Daugava→ Baltic Sea

The Rēzekne is a river of Latvia. The 116 kilometers long river discharges into Lake Lubāns in the Eastern Latvian Lowland. It flows through the city of Rēzekne for 10 kilometers.

== See also ==
- List of rivers of Latvia
