= Lake Lubāns =

Lake in Latvia

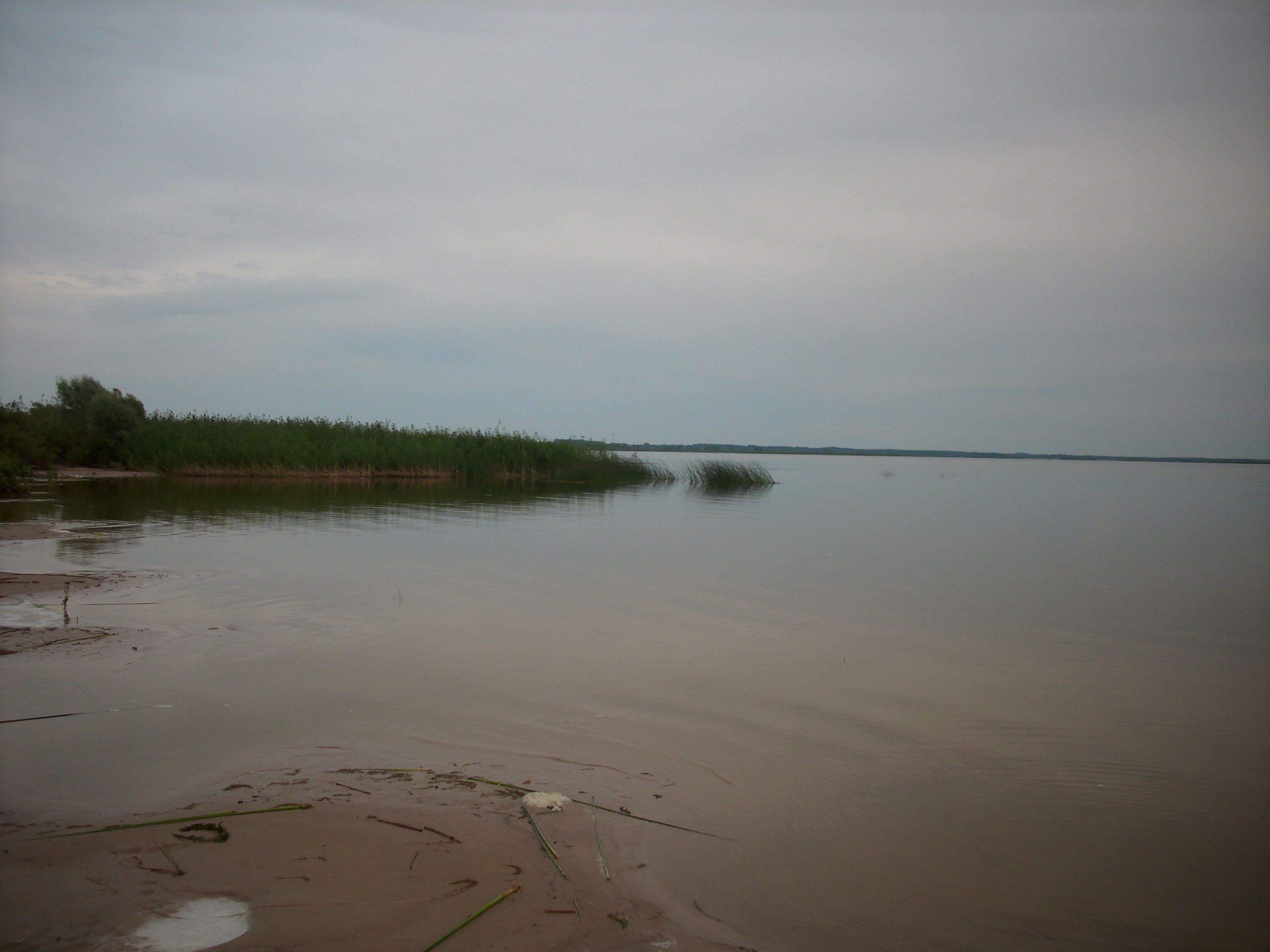

- Location within Latvia
- Coordinates: 56°46′N 26°52′E
- Type: natural lake, reservoir
- Primary inflows: Rēzekne, Malta, Malmuta, Lisinja
- Primary outflows: Aiviekste River
- Catchment area: 2,040 km^{2} (790 sq mi)
- Basin countries: Latvia
- Max. length: 15.7 km (9.8 mi)
- Surface area: 25–100 km^{2} (9.7–38.6 sq mi)
- Average depth: 1.6 m (5 ft 3 in)
- Max. depth: 3.5 m (11 ft)
- Surface elevation: 90–93 m (295–305 ft)
- Islands: 1 (Akmeņsala)

Lake Lubāns is the largest lake in Latvia (in Latvian: Lubāns, Lubānas ezers or Lubāna ezers).

The lake lies in the center of the Eastern Latvian Lowland. It is a shallow drainage lake, fed by the Rēzekne, Malta, Malmuta and Lisiņa rivers and several smaller brooks, with an outflow via the Aiviekste River into the Daugava River.

After the damaging spring floods in 1926, several dams and ditches were constructed. The elevation of the lake is allowed to fluctuate between approximately 90 and 93 metres above sea level. At an elevation of 90.75 m, the lake has a surface area of 25 km^{2} increasing to about 100 km^{2} at 92.75 m. In that state it is considered to be the biggest lake in Latvia.

Other small former lakes within the Lubanas basin have been artificially drained and the land used for agriculture.
