= Stende (river) =

River in Latvia

Coordinates: 57°33′N 21°55′E

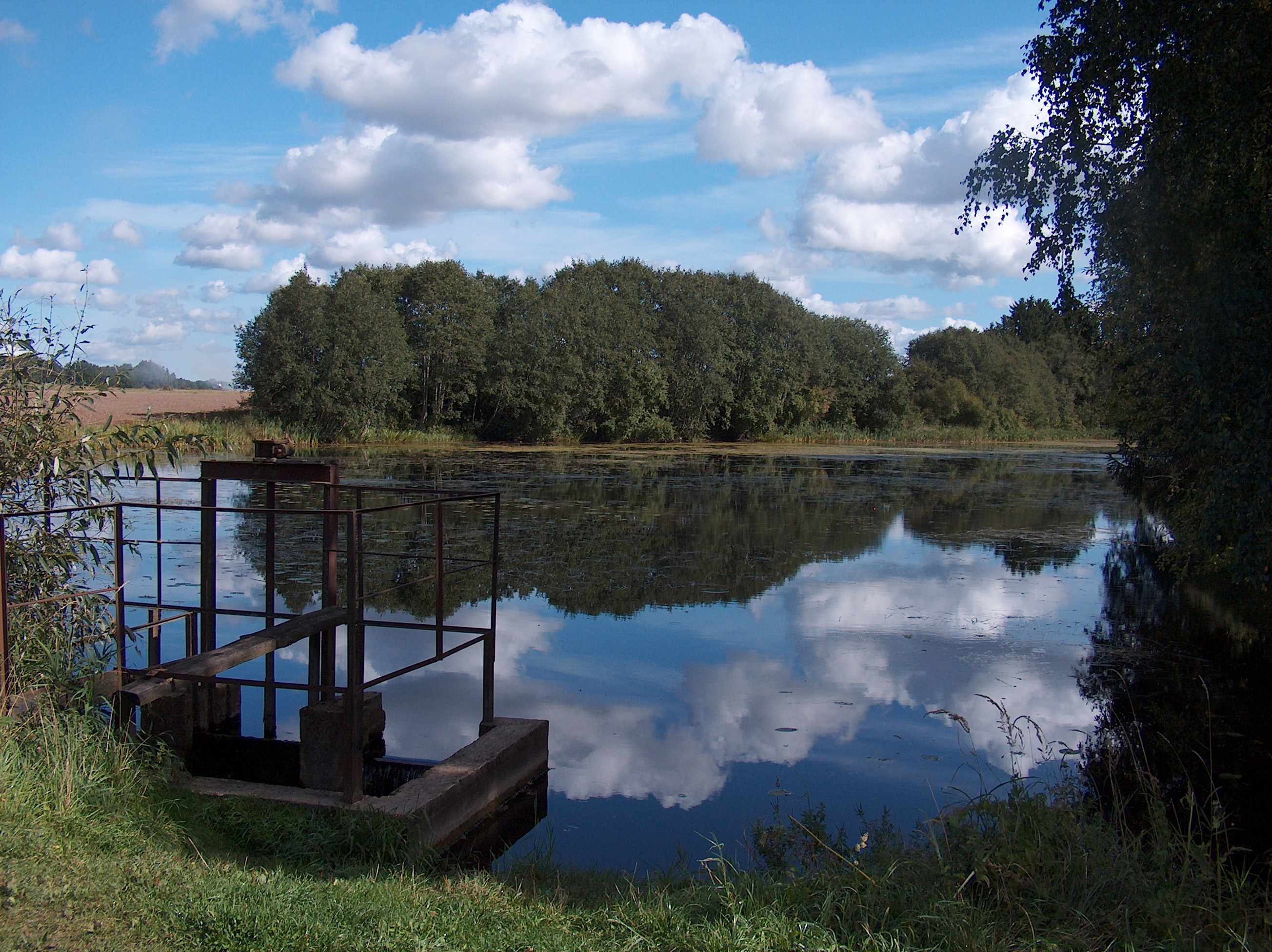

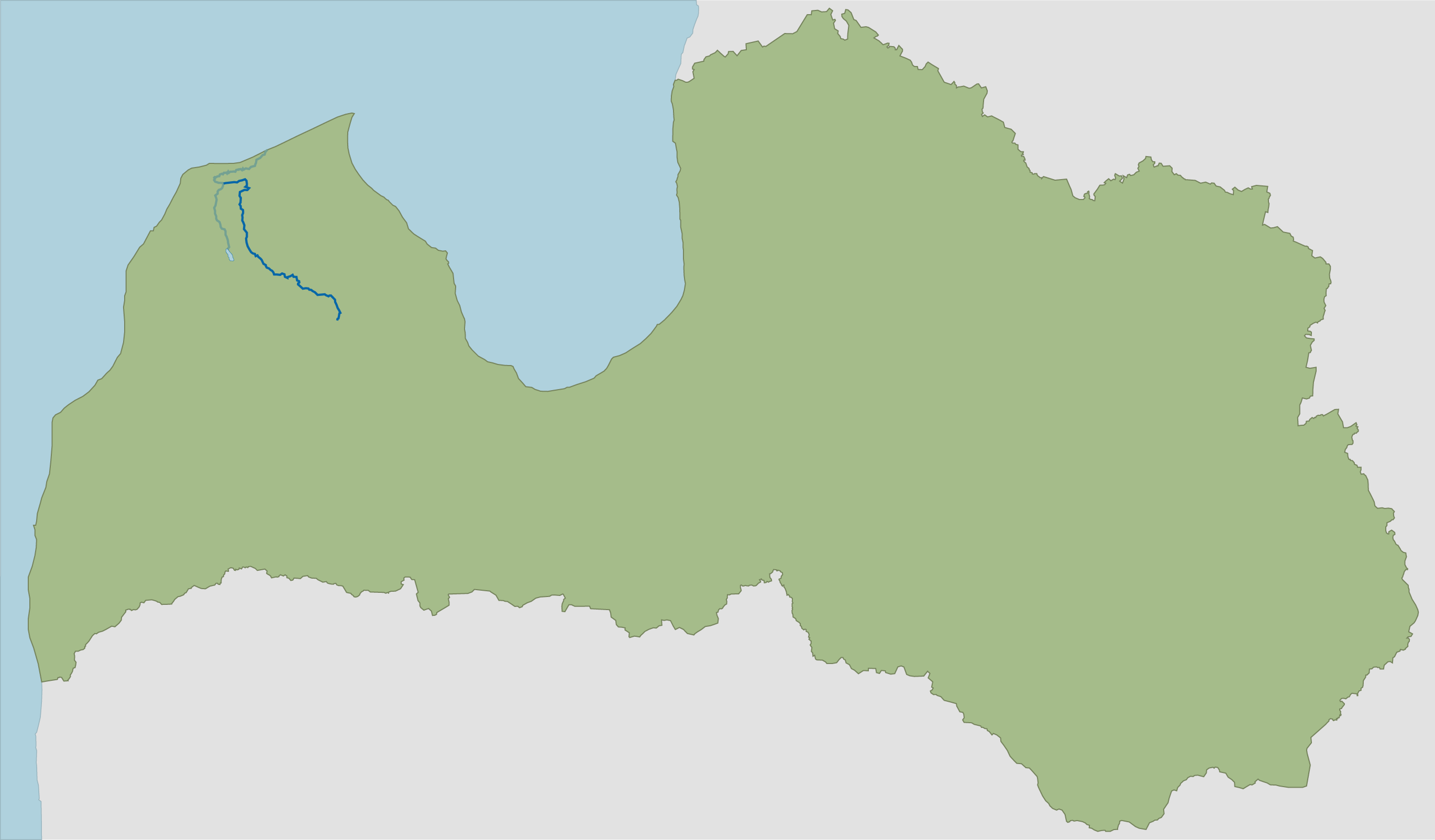

Location
- Country: Latvia

Physical characteristics
- Source
  - location: East of the town of Stende
- Mouth: Irbe (river)
  - elevation: 5.5 metres (18 ft)
- Length: 100 kilometres (62 mi)
- Basin size: 1,160 square kilometres (450 mi^{2})

The Stende is a river in Latvia. It is 100 kilometres long.

== See also ==
- List of rivers of Latvia
