= Liepupe Parish =

Parish of Latvia

- parish of Latvia
- Coat of arms

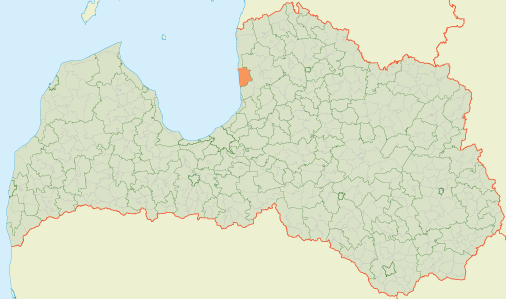
- 57°29′04″N 24°27′45″E
- Country: Latvia

Area
  - Total: 157.55 km^{2} (60.83 sq mi)
  - Land: 155.51 km^{2} (60.04 sq mi)
  - Water: 2.04 km^{2} (0.79 sq mi)

Population (1 January 2024)
  - Total: 1,693
  - Density: 11/km^{2} (28/sq mi)
- Website: www.salacgriva.lv/lat/liepupe/

Liepupe Parish (Latvian: Liepupes pagasts) is one of the administrative units of Limbaži Municipality in the Vidzeme region of Latvia. From 2009 to 2021, Liepupe Parish was part of the former Salacgrīva Municipality and before 2009, it was part of the former Limbazi District. The administrative center is the village of Mustkalni. Latvian law defines Liepupe Parish as a part of the region of Vidzeme.

== History ==
In 1322 Turaida Castle captured the boundaries of Liepupe parish. In 1403 Archbishop of Riga Janis V congregated in H. Fitthofhof, then obtained it Ikskili family, in 1467 H. Koskul, in 1490 V. Rosen. In Swedish Vidzeme in 1630 it was acquired by A. Tiesenhausen. In 1783-1784 was built the Liepupe masonry church, still standing.. After Latvian Land Reform of 1920 took effect the Perniegel manor was divided into 92 units (7 were rented houses) with a total area of 2498 ha.

In 1935 the area of Liepupe parish was 43.2 km^{2} and it had 776 inhabitants. Liepupes village council was established in the parish in 1945, which was liquidated in 1947 but restored in 1949 with the liquidation of the parish. The liquidated Duntes village was added to Liepupe village in 1954, and Tūja village in 1962. In 1977 part of Liepupe village territory was added to Limbažu and Skultes villages. In 1990 the village was reorganized into a parish. In 2009, Liepupe rural municipality was included as an administrative territory into Salacgrīva Municipality.

== Towns, villages and settlements of Liepupe Parish ==
- Dunte
- Jelgavkrasti
- Ķurmrags
- Lembuži
- Liepupe
- Mustkalni
- Prinkas
- Tūja
- Tūjasmuiža
