= Slagūne =

Village in Latvia

Coordinates: 56°37′N 23°04′E

Slagūne is a village in the Annenieki Parish of Dobele Municipality in the Semigallia region of Latvia. In 2015, it had 12 inhabitants.
