= Pededze =

River in Estonia and Latvia

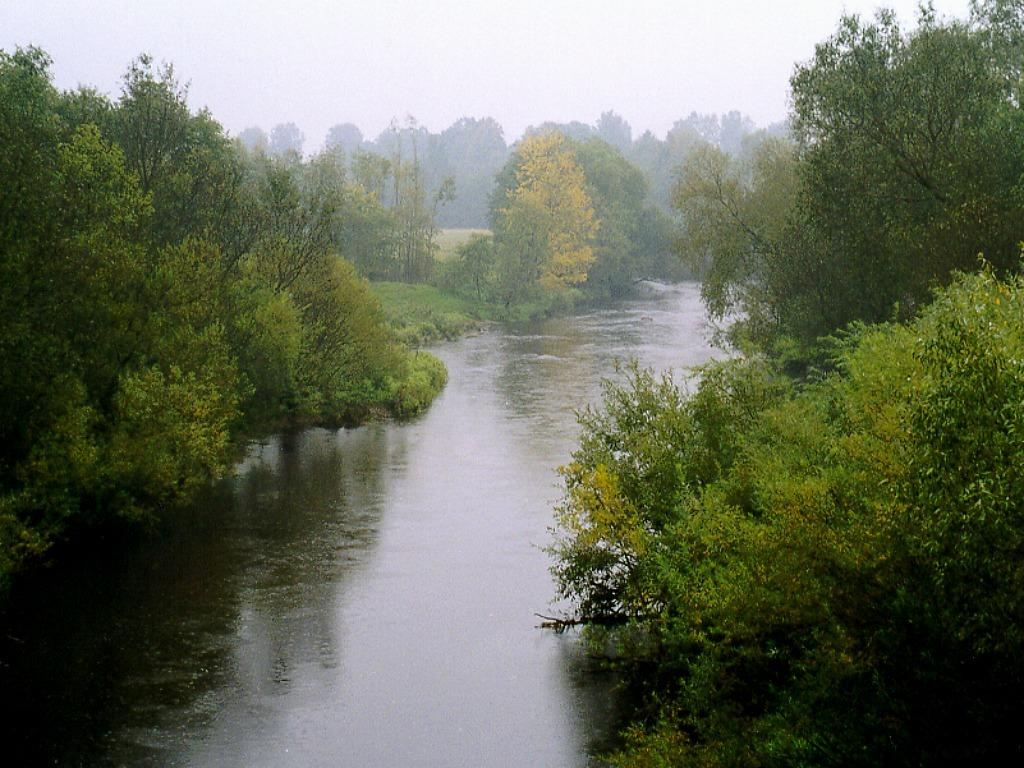
- The Pededze near Litene
- Native name: Pedetsi jõgi (Estonian)

Location
- Countries: Latvia; Estonia; Russia

Physical characteristics
- Source
  - location: Lake Kirikumäe
  - coordinates: 57°40′59″N 27°15′2″E
  - elevation: 108 m (354 ft)
- Mouth: Aiviekste
  - coordinates: 56.9372°N 26.8991°E
- Length: 159 km (99 mi)
- Basin size: 1,690 km^{2} (650 sq mi)
- Discharge
  - average: 12.2 m^{3}/s (430 cu ft/s)

Basin features
- Progression: Aiviekste→ Daugava→ Baltic Sea

The Pededze (Estonian: Pedetsi jõgi) is a river in Latvia and Estonia. It has a length of 159 km (99 mi), of which 131 km flow through Latvia. It flows in a generally southern direction. It is a right tributary of the Aiviekste, and the source of the Pededze is Lake Kirikumäe in the Haanja Uplands in Vastseliina Parish, Võru County, Estonia. The basin area of the Pededze is 1,690 km^{2} (1,523.3 km^{2} in Latvia; 119 km^{2} in Estonia), and its average discharge is 12.2 m³/s. The Pededze, together with the Aiviekste, forms the natural and historical border between Vidzeme and Latgale.
