= Zebrene Parish =

Parish of Latvia

- parish of Latvia
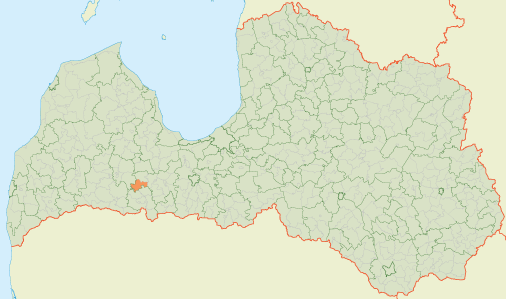
- 56°35′55″N 22°53′41″E
- Country: Latvia

Area
  - Total: 90.50 km^{2} (34.94 sq mi)
  - Land: 87.24 km^{2} (33.68 sq mi)
  - Water: 3.26 km^{2} (1.26 sq mi)

Population (1 January 2025)
  - Total: 405
  - Density: 4.64/km^{2} (12.0/sq mi)

Zebrene Parish (Latvian: Zebrenes pagasts) is an administrative unit of Dobele Municipality in the Semigallia region of Latvia.

== Towns, villages and settlements of Zebrene Parish ==
- Zebrene
