= Tartaks =

River in Latvia

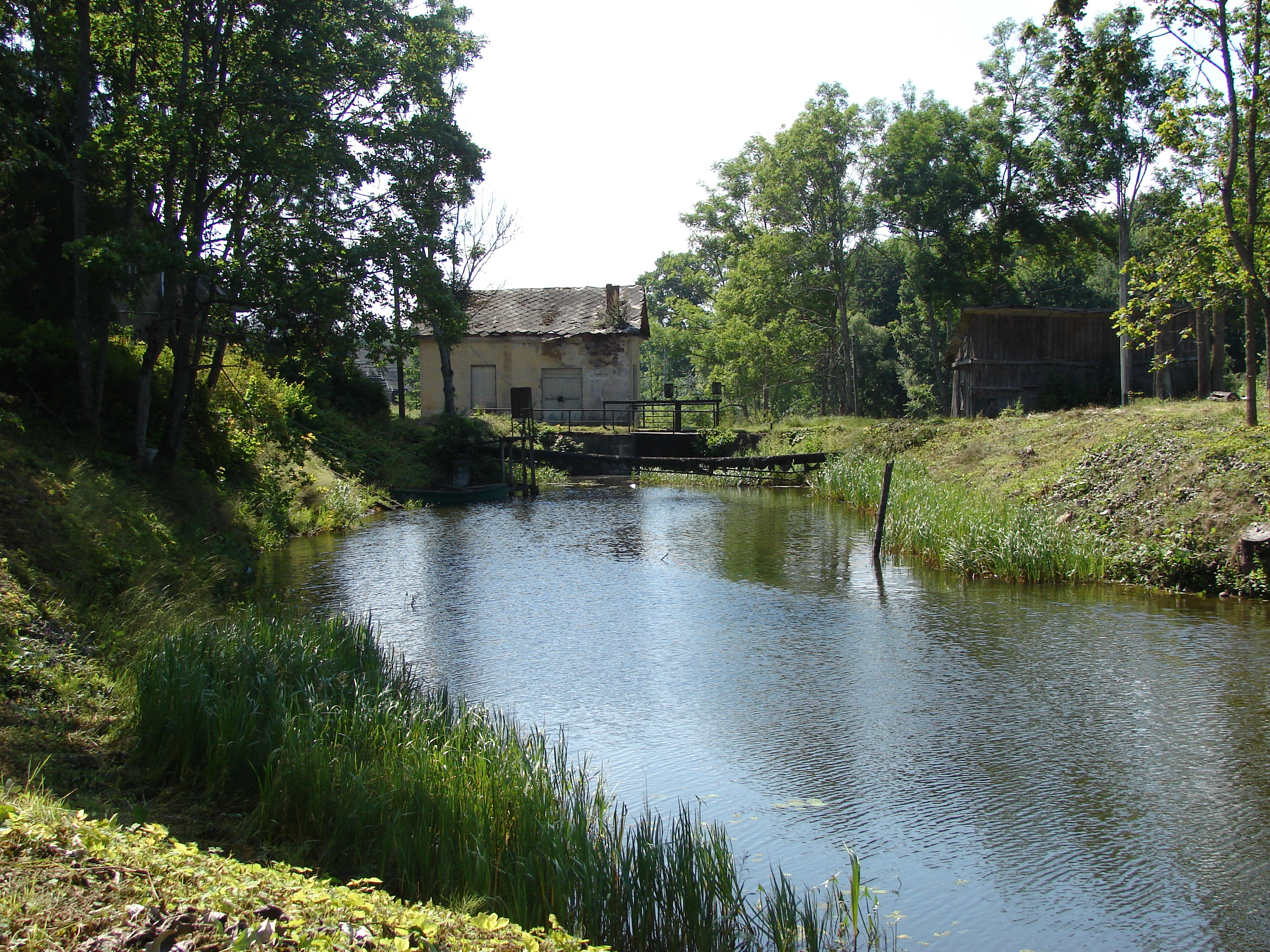

Location
- Country: Latvia

Physical characteristics
- Mouth: Dubna
  - coordinates: 56.0687°N 26.8235°E
- Length: 18 km (11 mi)

Basin features
- Progression: Dubna→ Daugava→ Baltic Sea

The Tartaks is a river in Latvia. It is 18 kilometres long. It discharges into the lake Luknas, which is drained by the Dubna.

== See also ==
- List of rivers of Latvia
