= Liepupe =

Village in Latvia

- village
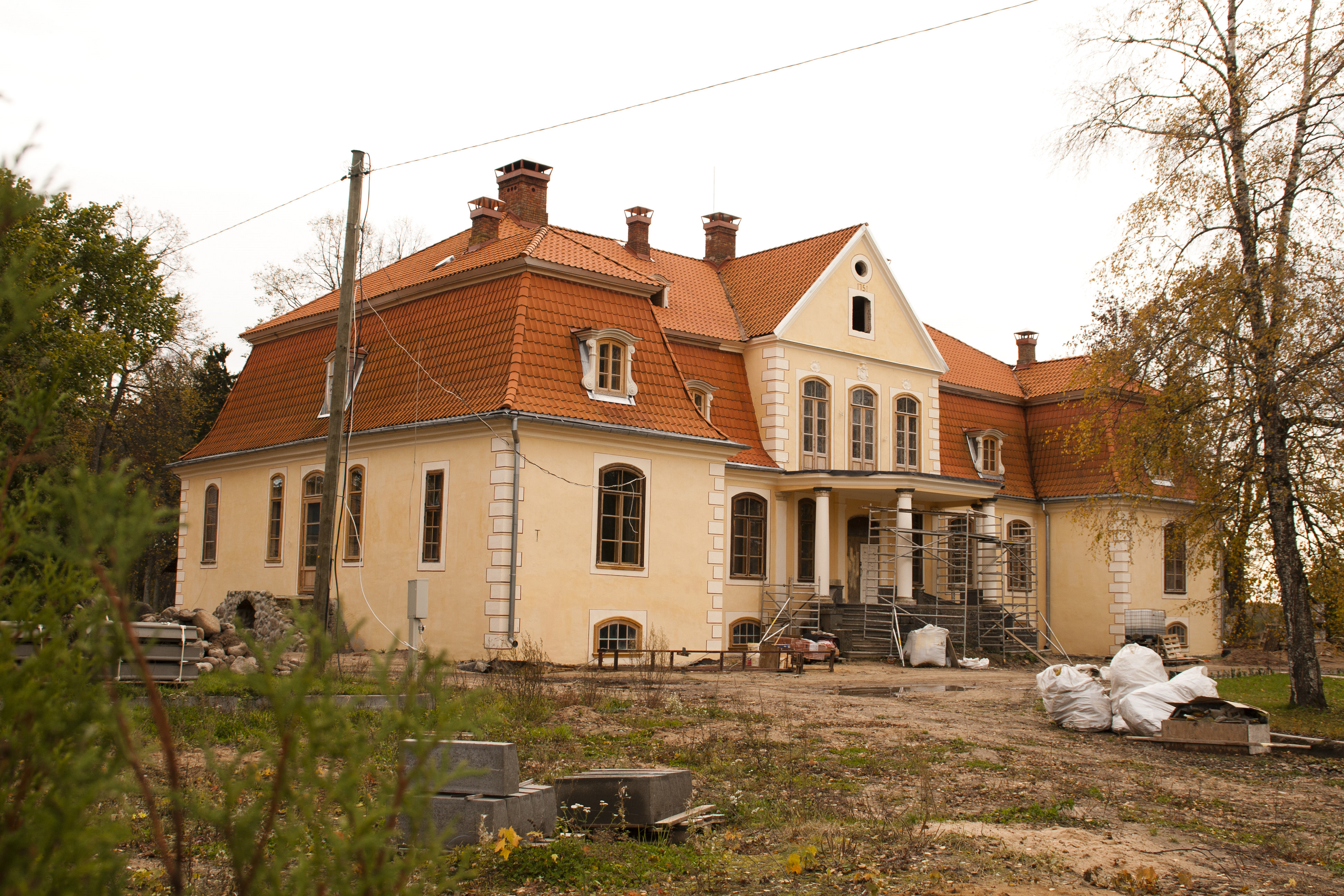
- Liepupe manor house

- Location within Latvia
- Coordinates: 57°27′48″N 24°28′16″E
- Country: Latvia
- Municipality: Limbaži Municipality
- Parish: Liepupe Parish

Population (2017)
  - Total: 326

Liepupe is a village in the Liepupe parish of Limbaži Municipality in the Vidzeme region of Latvia. The village is located 5 km from the Baltic Sea coast Metsepole Plain and Seaside Lowlands. The name of the village and the river Liepupe flowing through it comes from the Latvianized ancient Livs name Pernigele ( pārn - linden tree, joug - river; respectively liepa + upe), (which is also a cognate of "Pärnu River": Estonian: Pärnu jõgi).

== History ==
The village was founded in the 17th century next to the Liepupe estate. Liepupe Manor, built in 1751, is one of the best preserved baroque manors in Vidzeme.

== Culture ==
The Baltic Acoustic Music Festival, the Silver Gull, is being held in Liepupe since 2012. Liepupe has a library. Liepupe village church is located in Jelgavkrasti village.
