= Zebrene =

Village in Latvia

- Village
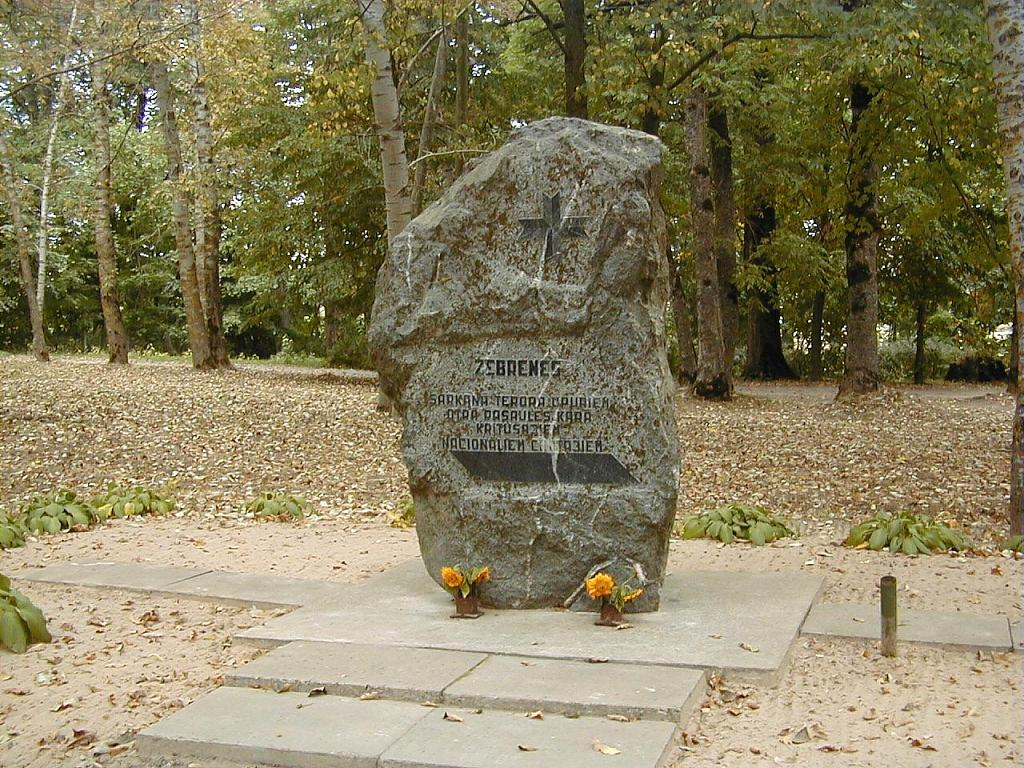
- Memorial for the victims of the Red Terror in Zebrene

- Zebrene's location in Latvia
- Coordinates: 56°36′N 22°53′E
- Country: Latvia
- Municipality: Dobele
- Parish: Zebrene

Zebrene is a village in the Zebrene Parish of Dobele Municipality in Semigallia region and the Zemgale Planning Region in Latvia.
