= Čeriaukštė =

River in Latvia and Lithuania

Čeriaukštė Ceraukste
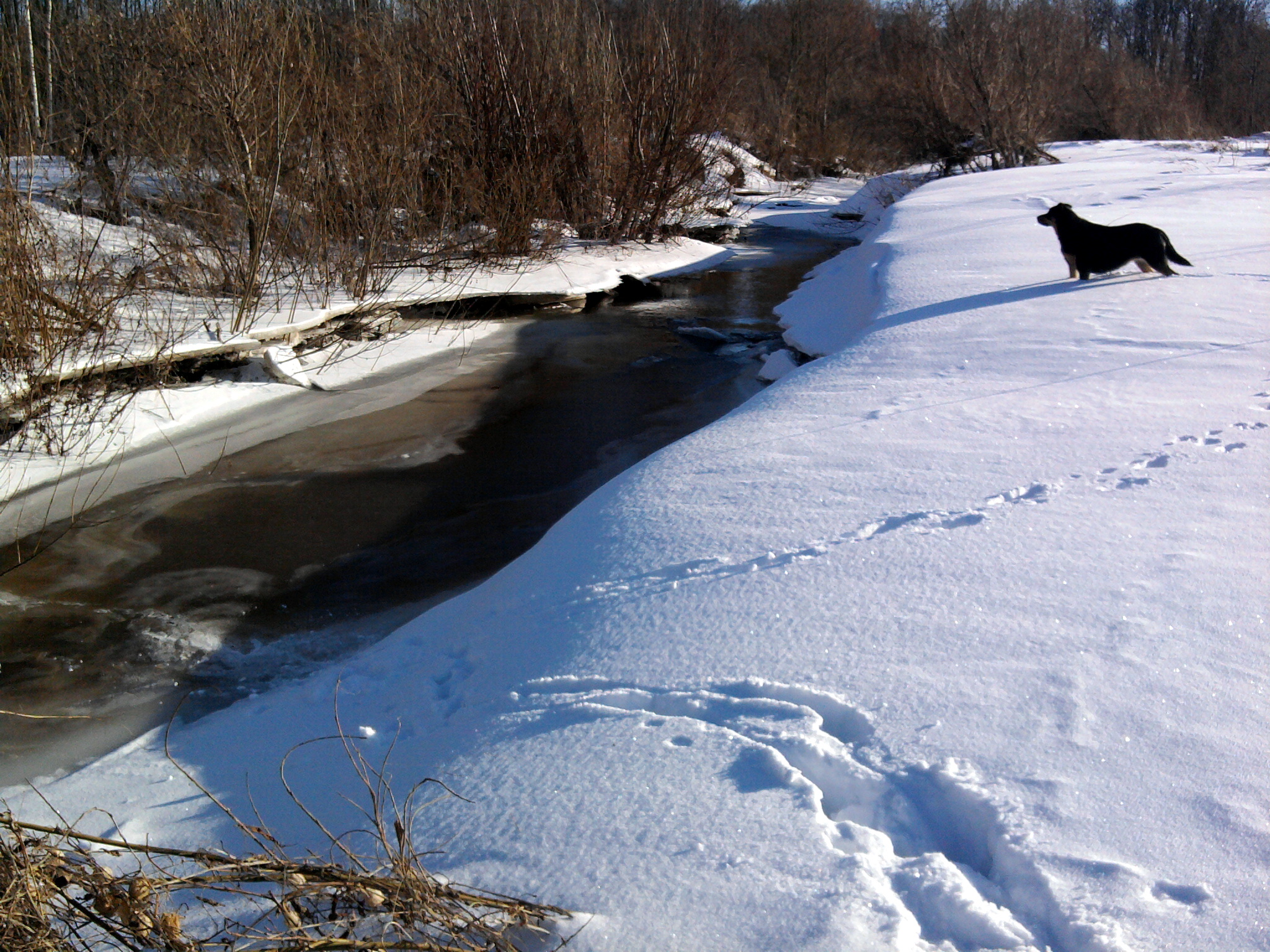

Location
- Countries: Lithuania, Latvia
- Region: Biržai district municipality, Panevėžys County

Physical characteristics
- Source
  - coordinates: 56°16′14″N 24°39′13″E
- Mouth: Mūša
  - coordinates: 56.3425°N 24.2552°E

Basin features
- Progression: Mūša→ Lielupe→ Baltic Sea

Čeriaukštė (Latvian: Ceraukste) is a river of northern Lithuania (Panevėžys County) and southern Latvia (Bauska Municipality). It flows for 30 kilometres and has a basin area of 152 km². It is a right tributary of the Mūša.
