= Upmala Parish =

Administrative unit in Latvia

- parish of Latvia
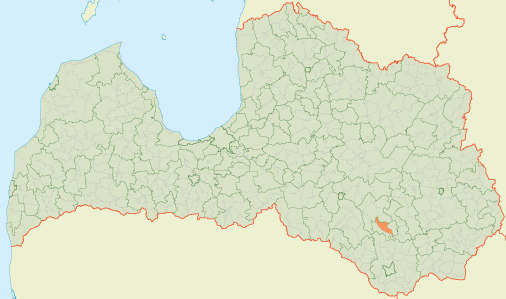
- Coordinates: 56°14′34″N 26°28′56″E
- Country: Latvia

Population (1 January 2026)
  - Total: 529

Upmala Parish is an administrative unit of Preiļi Municipality in the Latgale region of Latvia. From 2009 until 2021, it was part of the former Vārkava Municipality

== History ==
Upmalas village was formed in 1975 from the liquidated part of Stradiņi village and Vārkava village. In 1977 part of Upmala village was added to Rožkalnu village. In 1979, part of the Rauniešu village area was added to Upmalas village. The village was reorganized into a parish in 1990. In 2002, Upmala Parish merged with Rožkalnu Parish to form Vārkava Municipality.
