= Feimanka =

River in Latvia

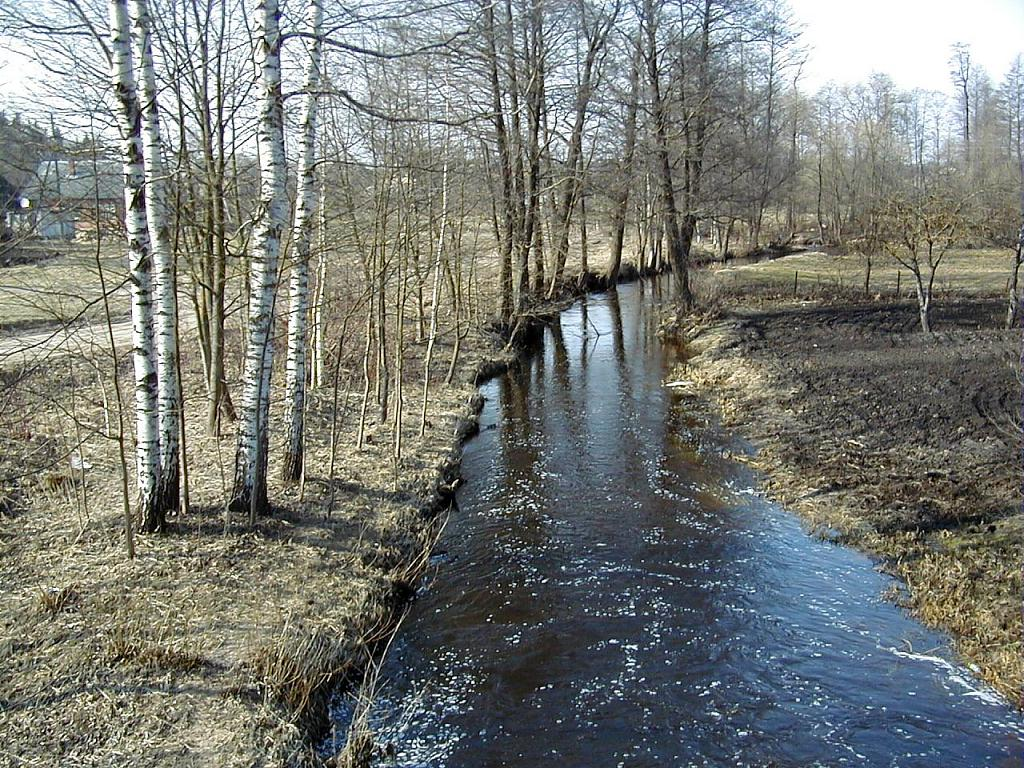
- The Feimanka in Riebiņi

Location
- Country: Latvia

Physical characteristics
- Mouth: Dubna
  - coordinates: 56.3389°N 26.3508°E
- Length: 72 km (45 mi)

Basin features
- Progression: Dubna→ Daugava→ Baltic Sea
- Tributaries
  - left: Preiļupe

The Feimanka (Polish: Fejmanka), a river (stream) in Latvia (Latgale, Preiļi Municipality), is the right tributary of the Dubna river. The 72 kilometres (45 mi) long Feimanka flows from Feimaņu ezers, passes through the city of Riebiņi and flows about 1.5 kilometers (one mi) north-west of the city of Preiļi. Its main tributary, the Preiļupe, joins its left bank in the area of Škilteri. The Feimanka flows into the Dubna in the village of Rožupe, about twelve kilometers before the latter's mouth to the Daugava.

== See also ==
- Rivers of Europe
