= Vecvārkava =

Village in Latvia

- Village
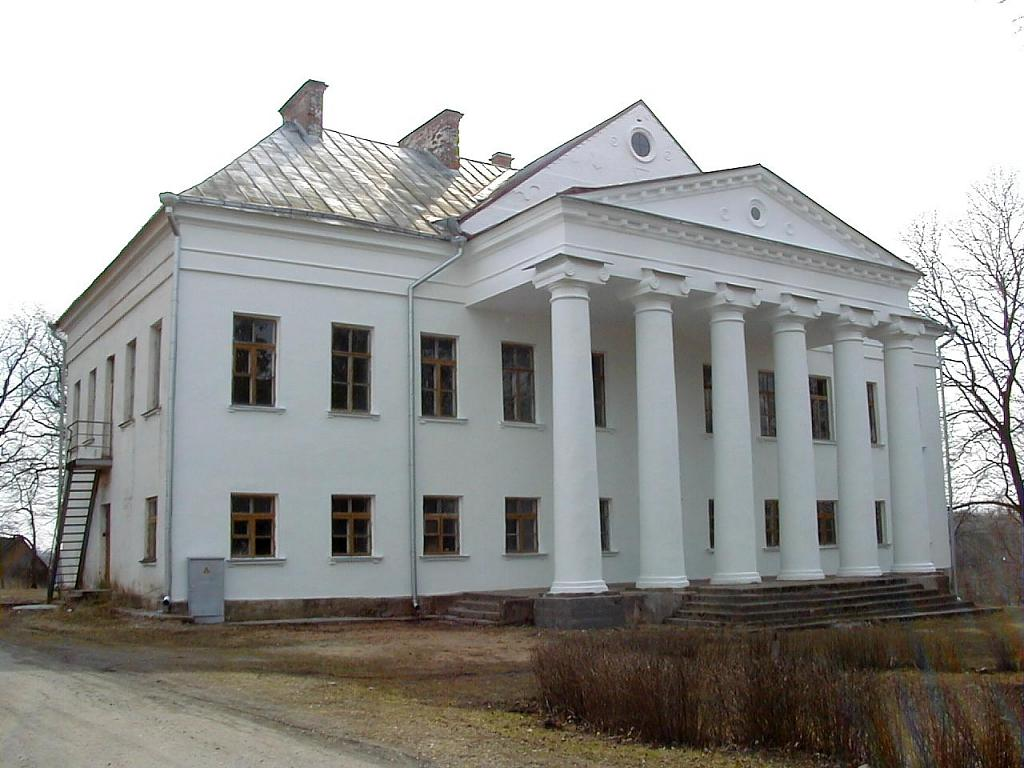
- Vārkavas manor in Vecvārkava

- Vecvārkava's location in Latvia
- Coordinates: 56°11′47.42″N 26°31′25.06″E
- Country: Latvia
- Municipality: Preiļi
- Parish: Upmala

Vecvārkava is a village in Upmala Parish, Preiļi Municipality in the Latgale region in eastern Latvia. It lies along the course of the Dubna river.
