= Irbe (river) =

River in Latvia

Coordinates: 57°38′50″N 22°09′21″E

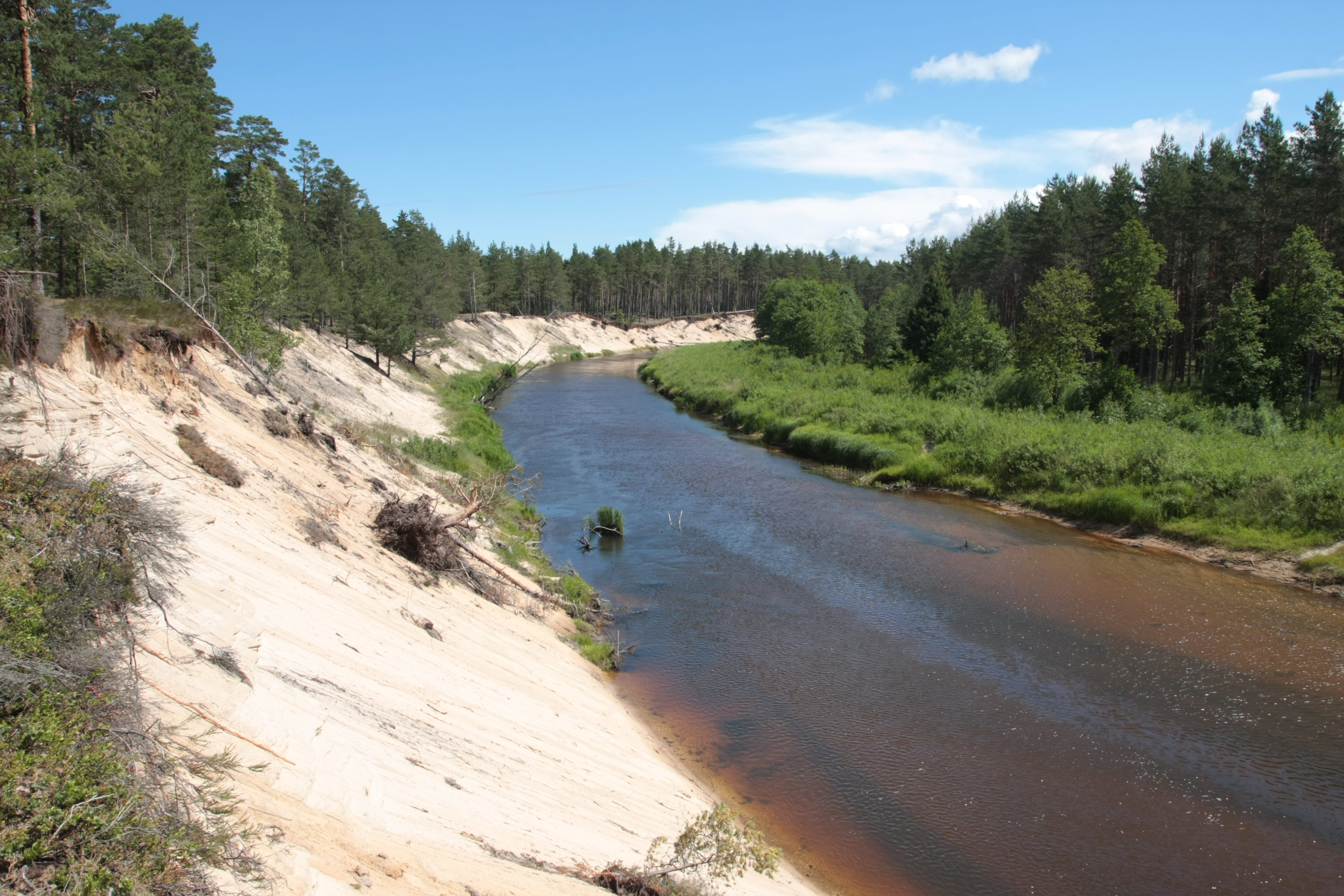
- Irbe by Miķeļtornis

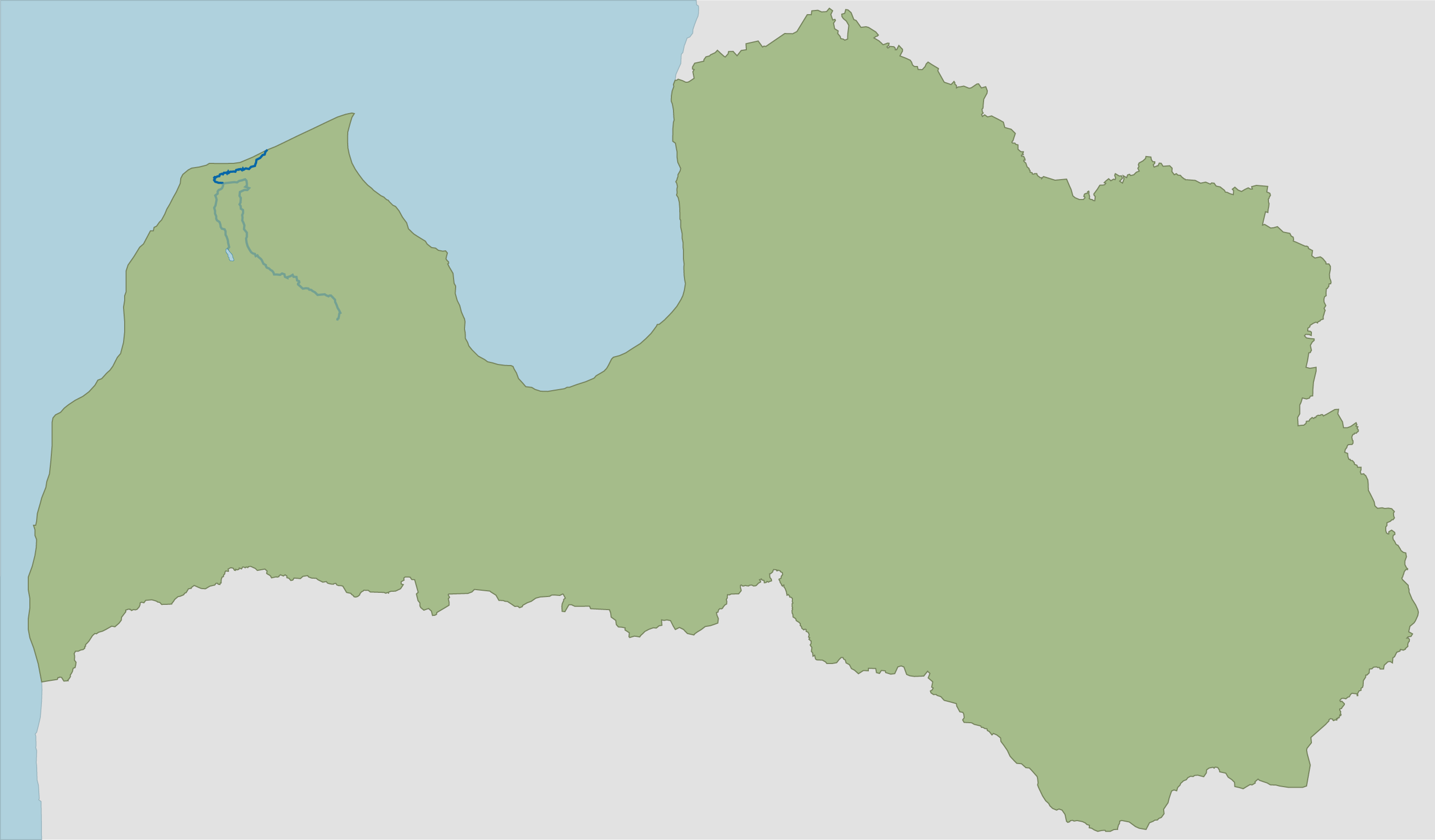
- Confluence of the Stende and Rinda rivers
- Native name: Īra (Livonian)

Location
- Country: Latvia

Physical characteristics
- Source: Confluence of Stende (river) and Rinde
- Mouth: Baltic Sea (Irbe Strait)
- Length: 32 kilometres (20 mi)

Basin features
- Tributaries
  - left: Dižgrāvis

Irbe (also Dižirbe, Dižirve, Irbes upe, Irve, Livonian: Īra) is a coastal river on the northern Courland Peninsula, Latvia. Of length 32 km, it starts as the confluence of Stende and Rinda rivers and it follows the coastline of the Irbe Strait, reaching the Baltic Sea in the Irbe Strait about halfway between the promontories of the Oviši Lighthouse and cape Kolka. It runs within the Tārgale parish, Ventspils district. Its only significant tributary (left) is Dižgrāvis.

The brown moor water of the river constantly moves large sandbanks in its estuary. The river is used as spawning ground by brown trout.
