= Lake Kirikumäe =

Lake in Estonia

- Kirikumäe järv (Estonian)
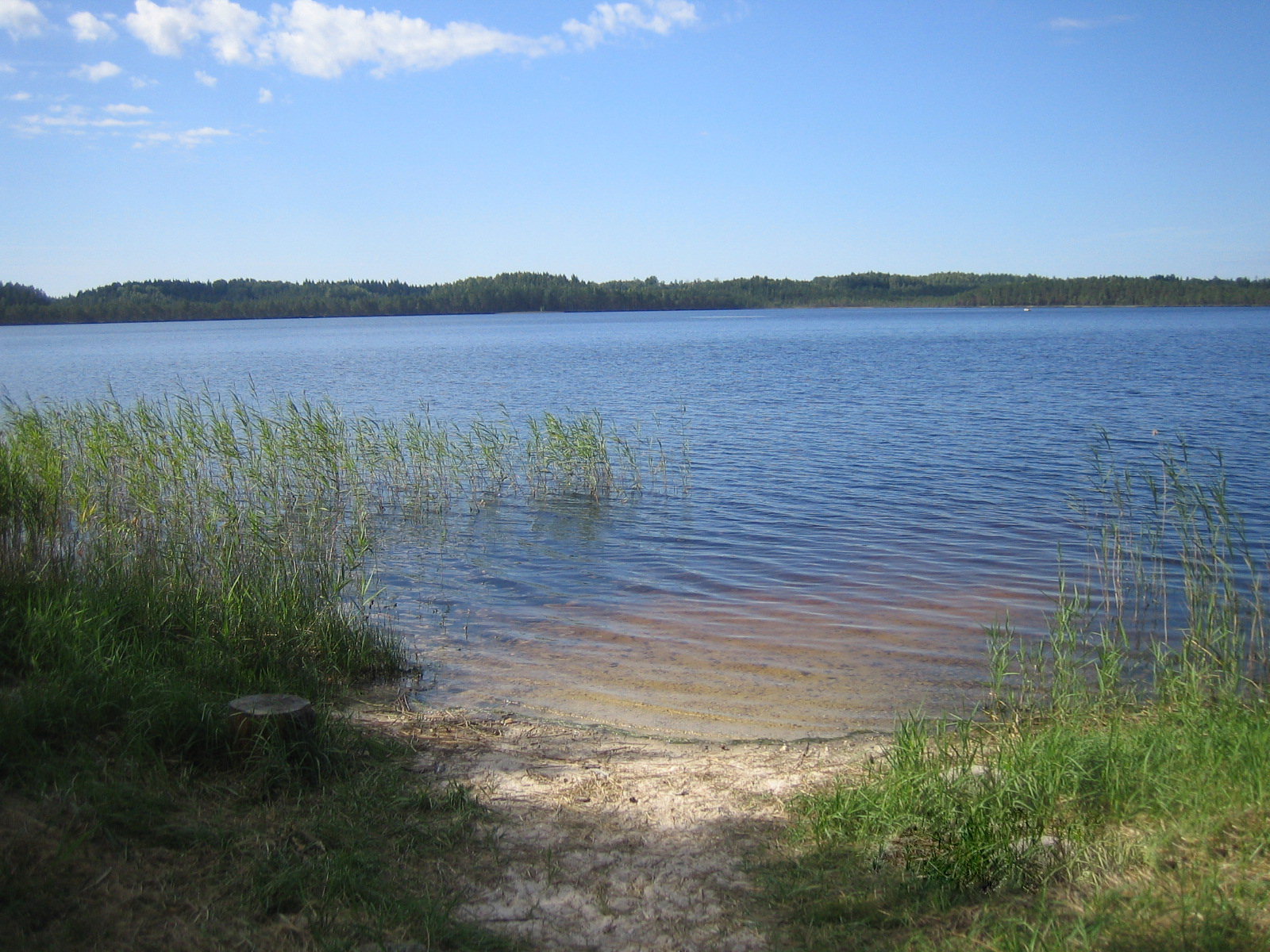

- Location within Estonia
- Location: Võru Parish, Võru County, Estonia
- Coordinates: 57°41′N 27°15′E
- Basin countries: Estonia
- Max. length: 1,010 meters (3,310 ft)
- Surface area: 63.0 hectares (156 acres)
- Average depth: 2.5 meters (8 ft 2 in)
- Max. depth: 3.5 meters (11 ft)
- Water volume: 1,536,000 cubic meters (54,200,000 cu ft)
- Shore length^{1}: 3,200 meters (10,500 ft)
- Surface elevation: 183.5 meters (602 ft)
- ^{1} Shore length is not a well-defined measure.

Lake Kirikumäe (Estonian: Kirikumäe järv) is a lake in Estonia. It is located in the village of Kirikumäe in Võru Parish, Võru County.

== Physical description ==
The lake has an area of 63.0 hectares (156 acres). The lake has an average depth of 2.5 meters (8 ft 2 in) and a maximum depth of 3.5 meters (11 ft). It is 1,010 meters (3,310 ft) long, and its shoreline measures 3,200 meters (10,500 ft). It has a volume of 1,536,000 cubic meters (54,200,000 cu ft).

== See also ==
- List of lakes of Estonia
