= Liepupe (river) =

River in Latvia

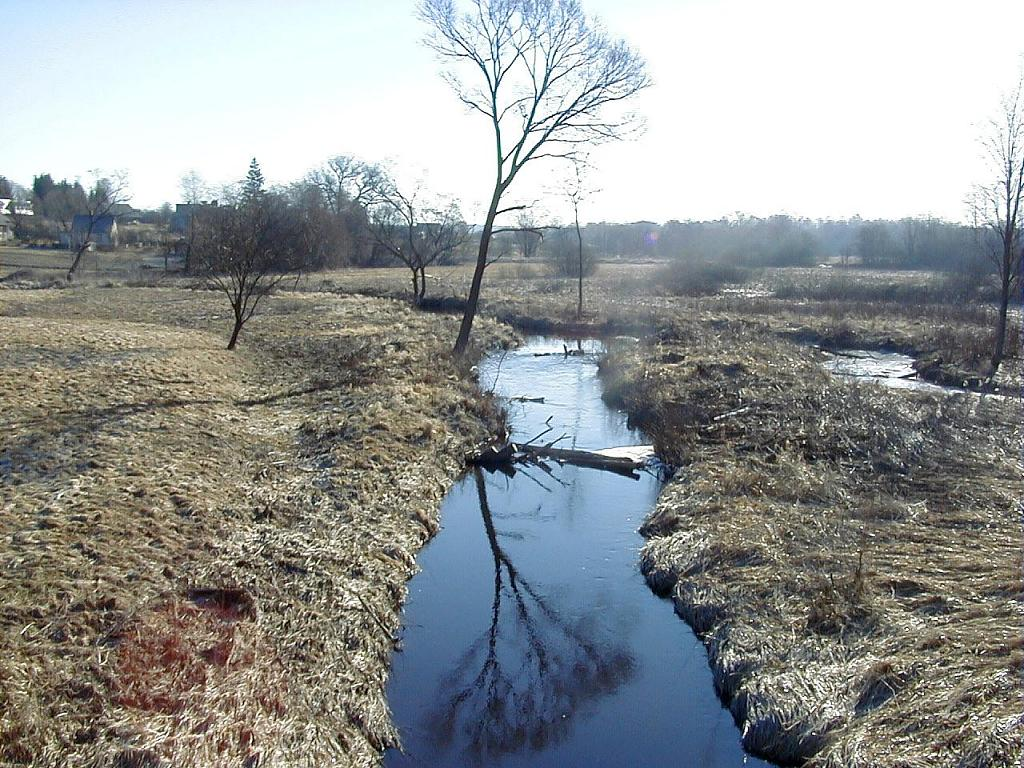
- Liepupe at Jelgavkrasti (2002).

- Location within Latvia
- Native name: Liepupe (Latvian)

Location
- Country: Latvia

Physical characteristics
- Source
  - coordinates: 57°30′35″N 24°33′30″E
  - elevation: 43 m (141 ft)
- Mouth
  - location: Gulf of Riga, Baltic Sea
  - coordinates: 57°27′47″N 24°23′10″E
- Length: 21 km (13 mi)
- Basin size: 55.8 km^{2} (21.5 sq mi)
- Discharge
  - average: 95 m^{3}/s (3,400 cu ft/s)

Liepupe is a coastal river in the Limbaži Municipality in the Vidzeme region of Latvia. River source is in the Virbotne forest west of Riebezer lake, it then flows along the Metsepole Plain and Piejūras Lowlands. At the Prinkas village on Liepupe-Reynupe Canal, which connects Liepupe with Vitrupe. The last 3 km of the river has a large relative fall (4.3 m / km) and flows into Gulf of Riga at Lembuži. Coastal settlements on the river are Liepupe and Jelgavkrasti. The river is crossed by the highway Via Baltica. The German name "Pernigele" comes from the Liv language. In Liv language, Pärn - linden, joug - river, stream, i.e. - Liepu River - Liepupe.
