= Kirikumäe =

Village in Estonia

- Location within Estonia
- Coordinates: 57°41′46″N 27°14′43″E
- Country: Estonia
- County: Võru County
- Time zone: UTC+2 (EET)

Kirikumäe is a settlement in Võru Parish, Võru County in southeastern Estonia.
