= Annenieki Parish =

Parish in Dobele Municipality, Latvia

- parish of Latvia
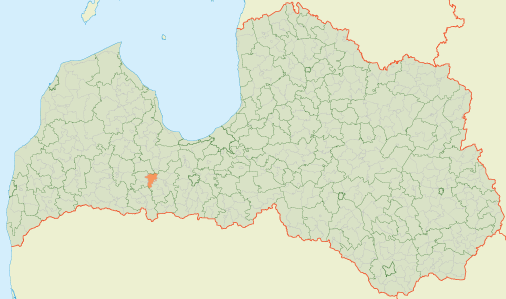
- 56°38′54″N 23°04′55″E
- Country: Latvia

Area
  - Total: 85.45 km^{2} (32.99 sq mi)
  - Land: 83.34 km^{2} (32.18 sq mi)
  - Water: 2.11 km^{2} (0.81 sq mi)

Population (1 January 2025)
  - Total: 770
  - Density: 9.2/km^{2} (24/sq mi)

Annenieki Parish (Latvian: Annenieku pagasts) is an administrative unit of Dobele Municipality in the Semigallia region of Latvia.

== Towns, villages and settlements of Annenieki Parish ==
- Annenieki
- Kaķenieki
- Bērzupe
- Ļukas
- Slagūne
- Ausātas
