= Svete (river) =

River in Latvia and Lithuania

Švėtė, Svēte
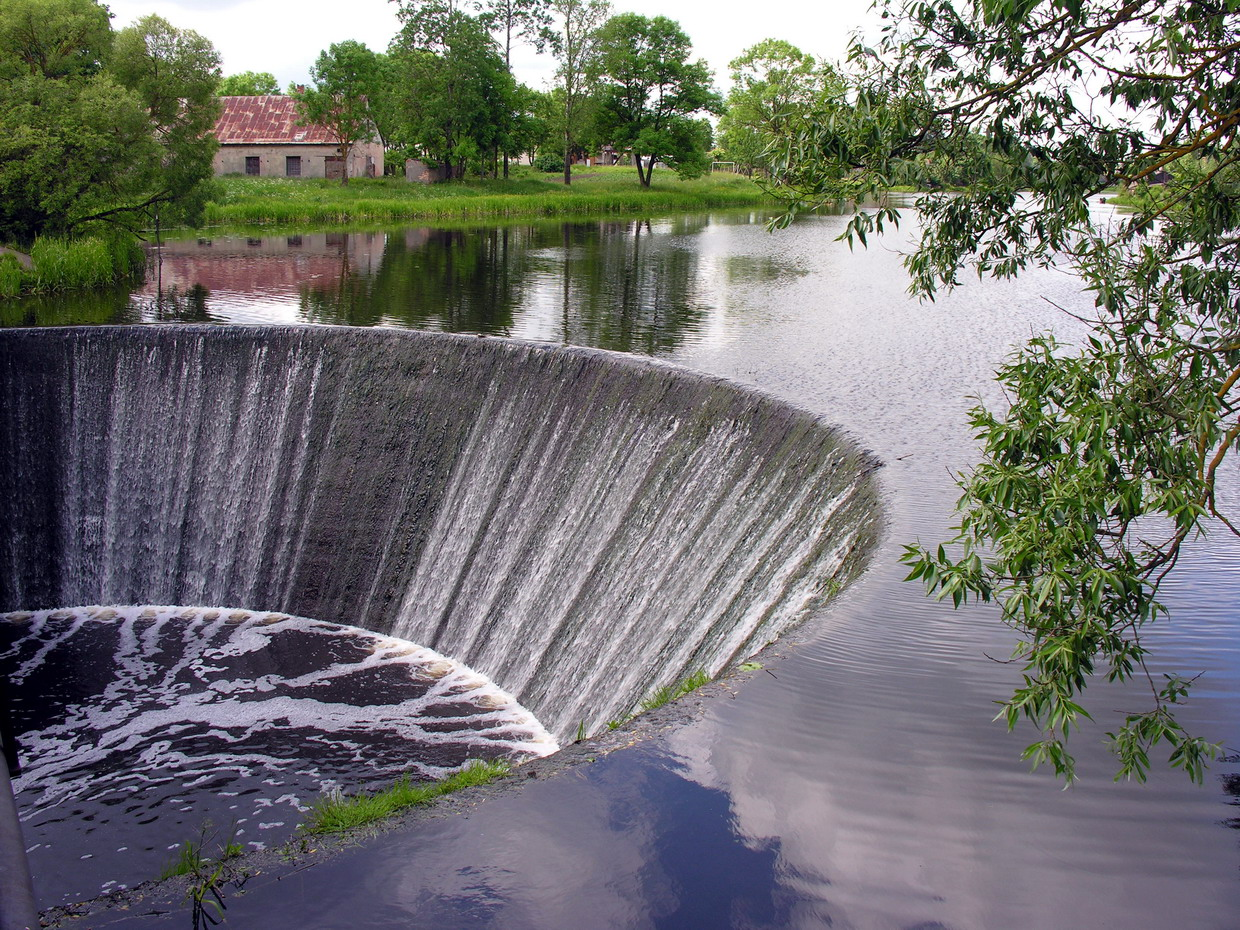
- The Švėtė near Žagarė

Location
- Country: Lithuania, Latvia

Physical characteristics
- Source
  - location: Šiauliai district
- Mouth: Lielupe
  - coordinates: 56.7190°N 23.6477°E
- Length: 123 km (76 mi)
- Basin size: 2,295 km^{2} (886 sq mi)
- Discharge
  - average: 2.7 m^{3}/s (95 cu ft/s)

Basin features
- Progression: Lielupe→ Baltic Sea
- Tributaries
  - left: Bērze

The river Švėtė (Lithuanian: Švėtė, Latvian: Svēte) flows through the Šiauliai and Joniškis districts in the northern part of Lithuania, and the southern part of Latvia. The source of the Švėtė is near Tulominai, about 16 km southeast of Kuršėnai, and the river flows north passing by Žagarė, near the Latvian border. It is a tributary of the Lielupe, joining it 8 km to the northwest of Jelgava. The Lielupe ultimately flows into the Baltic Sea.

The upper part of the Švėtė can dry up completely in very dry summers. Its main tributaries are the Šakyna, Žarė, Tērvete, Bērze, Žvairilas, Bukiškis, Juodupis, Katmilžis and Vilkija rivers.
