= Dubna (Daugava) =

River in Latvia

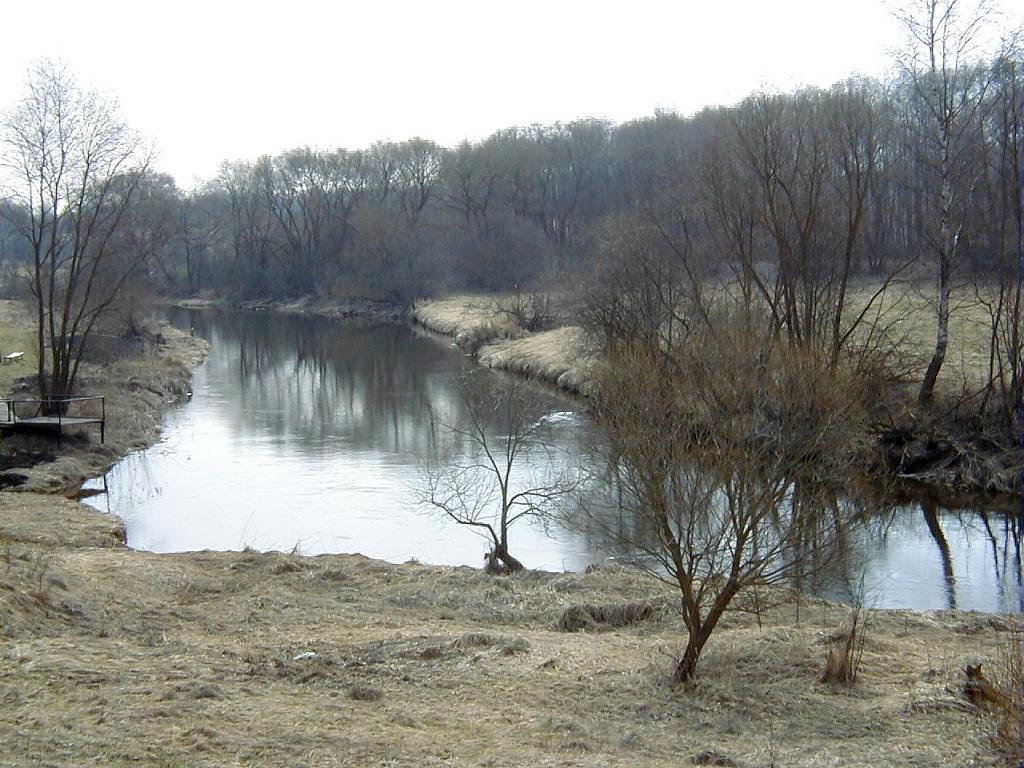
- The Dubna near Vārkava

Location
- Country: Latvia

Physical characteristics
- Source
  - location: Lake Cārmins, Latvia
  - coordinates: 56°02′18″N 27°10′24″E
- Mouth: Daugava
  - location: Līvāni
  - coordinates: 56°21′45″N 26°09′43″E
- Length: 105 km (65 mi)
- Basin size: 2,785 km^{2} (1,075 sq mi)

Basin features
- Progression: Daugava→ Baltic Sea
- Tributaries
  - left: Kolupe
  - right: Tartaks, Jaša, Feimanka, Ūša

The Dubna is a river in eastern Latvia and a right-bank tributary of the Daugava. It joins the Daugava in the town of Līvāni, around 170 kilometers east of Riga, the capital.

== Largest tributaries ==
- Feimanka (72 km)
- Ūša (62 km)
- Kolupe (32 km)
- Jaša (28 km)

== Largest populated areas on river coast ==
- Špoģi
- Vecvārkava
- Rožupe
- Līvāni

== See also ==
- List of rivers of Latvia
