= Aiviekste =

River in Latvia

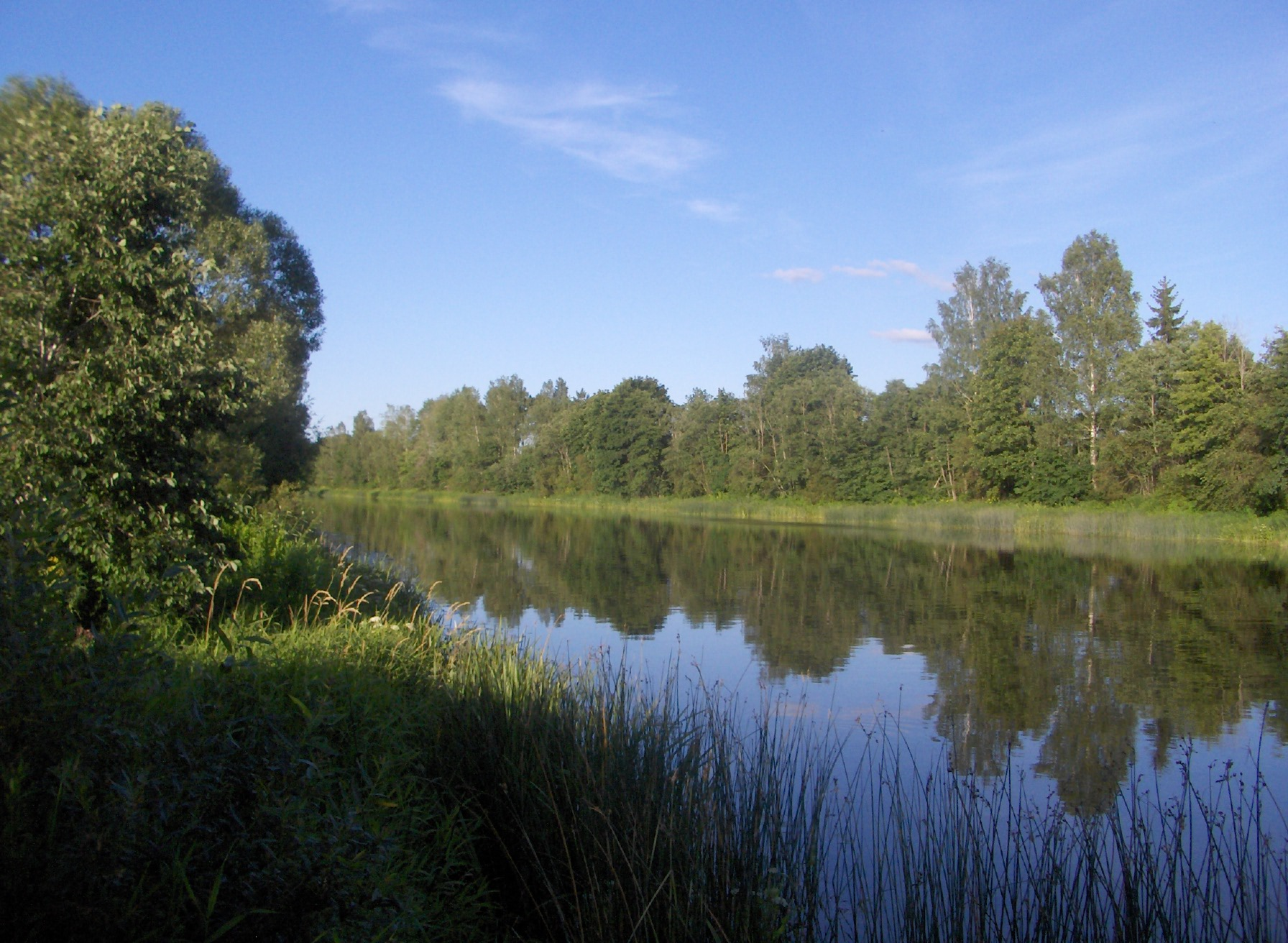
- Aiviekste near the source

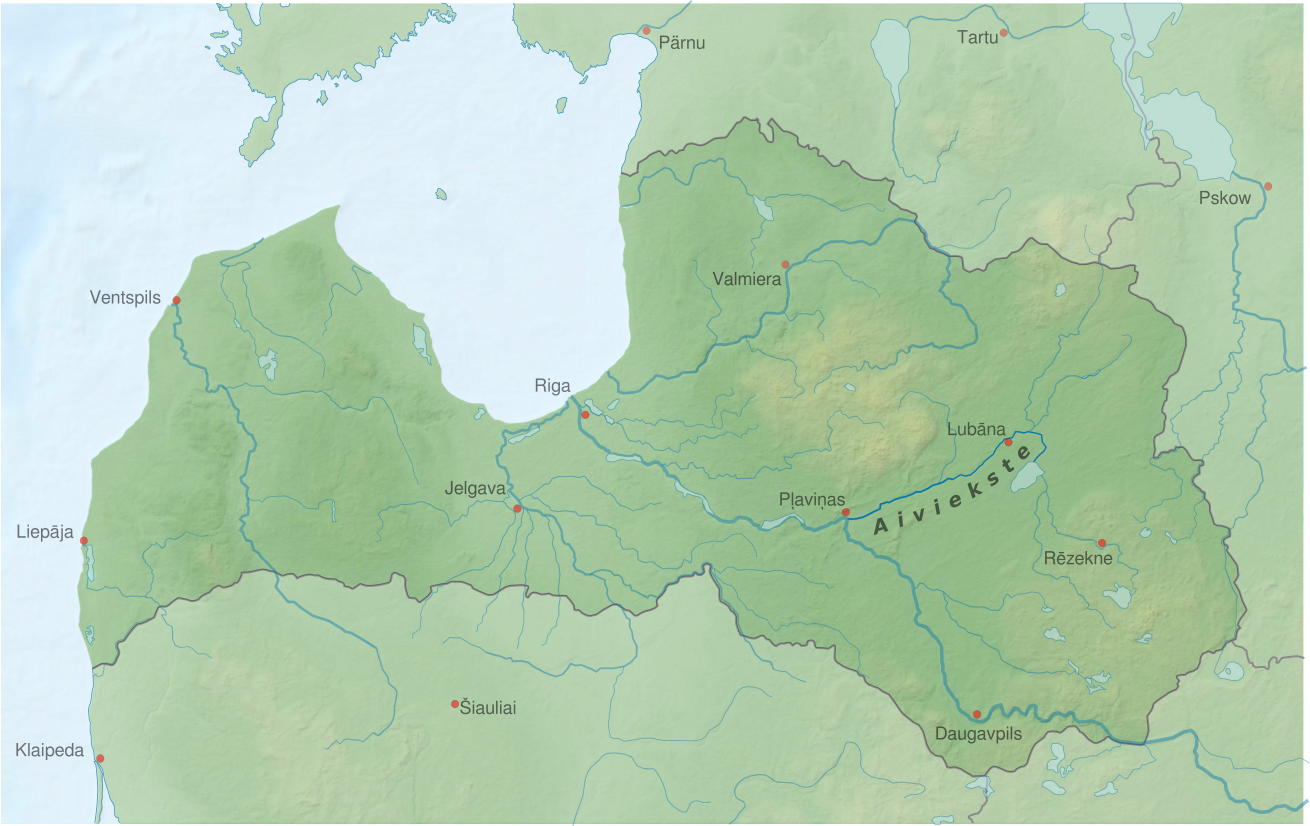
- The Aiviekste river

Location
- Country: Latvia

Physical characteristics
- Source
  - location: Lake Lubāns
- Mouth: Daugava
  - location: Pļaviņas
  - coordinates: 56.6144°N 25.7583°E
- Length: 114 kilometres (71 mi)
- Basin size: 9,160 km^{2} (3,540 sq mi)
- Discharge
  - average: 57.4 cubic metres per second (2,030 cu ft/s)

Basin features
- Progression: Daugava→ Baltic Sea

The Aiviekste is a river in Latvia. It begins at Lake Lubāns (the largest lake in Latvia) and drains into the Daugava (the largest river in Latvia). The Aiviekste is the largest tributary of the Daugava in Latvia. The Aiviekste, along with the Pededze, forms the unofficial border between two historical Latvian regions Vidzeme and Latgale, although the administrative border was slightly different. The river is 114 kilometers long, with annual drainage 1.81 km^{3}. The Aiviekste is between 10,000 and 12,000 years old, formed at the end of the last ice age. Nearly a quarter of the river's flow is unregulated, but most of the river has been excavated, including with explosions.

The Aiviekste flows from the northern end of Lake Lubāns, where it does a wide semicircle and then turns southwest. At this stage is the smallest drop, in addition, here Aiviekste receives the largest tributaries Pededze, Bolupe and Iča. Furthermore, it was straightened and deepened for 83 km. At the lower end, Aiviekste flows through a slightly undulating area. There are several islands, sandbars and about 15 stone sills here in the river. The small Aiviekste hydroelectric power plant (1.4 MW) was built on one of these island groups. After the construction of the Pļaviņu hydroelectric power plant, the lower end of Aiviekste is flooded with a reservoir. It flows through the towns of Lubāna and Pļaviņas (estuary). Near Krievciems - a dolomite quarry.

The river collects water mainly from the East Latvian lowland (Latvian: Austrumlatvijas zemiene). 25% of the area of the Aiviekste basin is covered by forests, 15% - by marshes. There are many wet meadows in the basin, large swamps. Aiviekste is rich in fish. Aiviekste is regulated by locks and canals, as its flow capacity is several times too low when the flood season begins in Lake Lubāns. Until the end of 20th century, during the spring floods, the waters of Aiviekste flowed back into Lubāns upstream due to the influx of tributaries, which intensified the floods there. The Aiviekste floodplain in the middle of the river is a nature reserve as a habitat for birds and a home for rare plants. The fall of the river to the Aiviekste hydroelectric power station of Aiviekste is 1 m by 14 km, and only after that in the last 14 km it increases tenfold.

== Tributaries ==
- Left side: Zvidze, Isliena, Abaine
- Right side: Iča, Piestiņa, Pededze, Liede, Kuja, Svētupe, Arona, Veseta

== Gallery ==
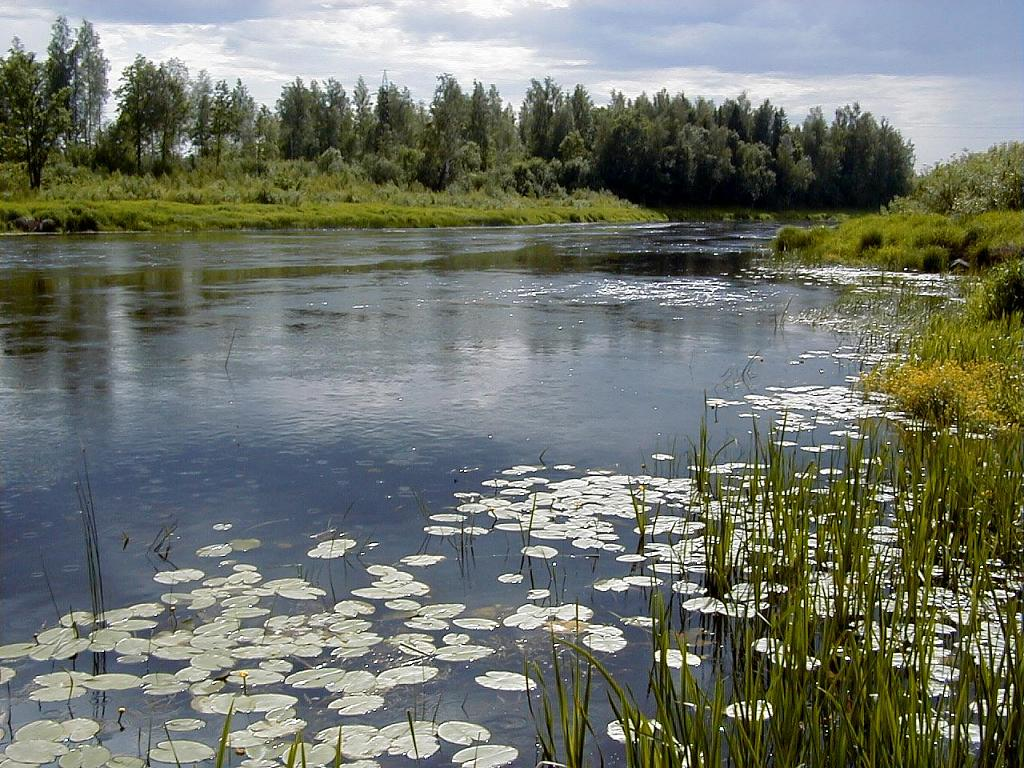
Aiviekste near bridge of Veseta

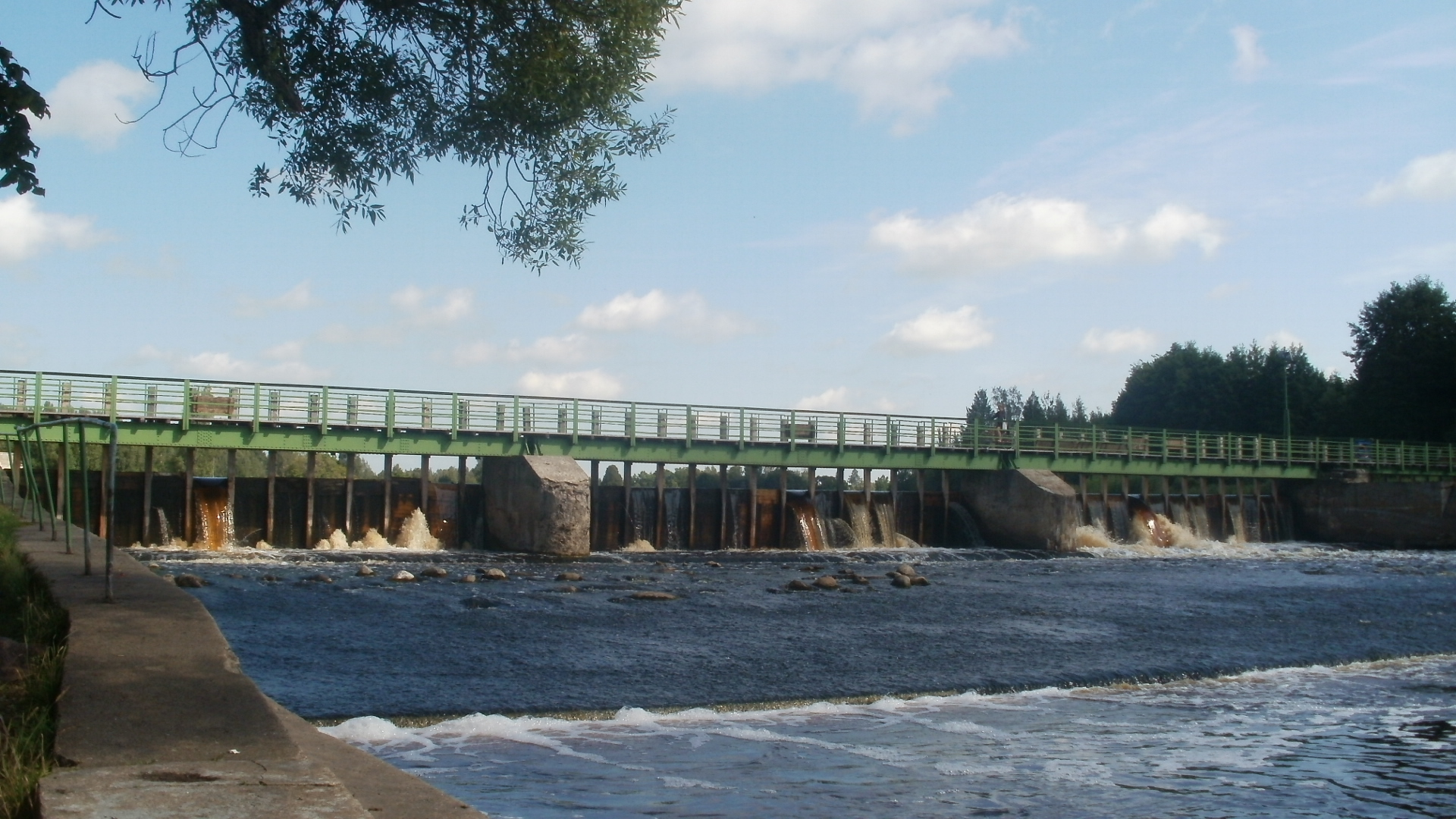
Aiviekste power plant

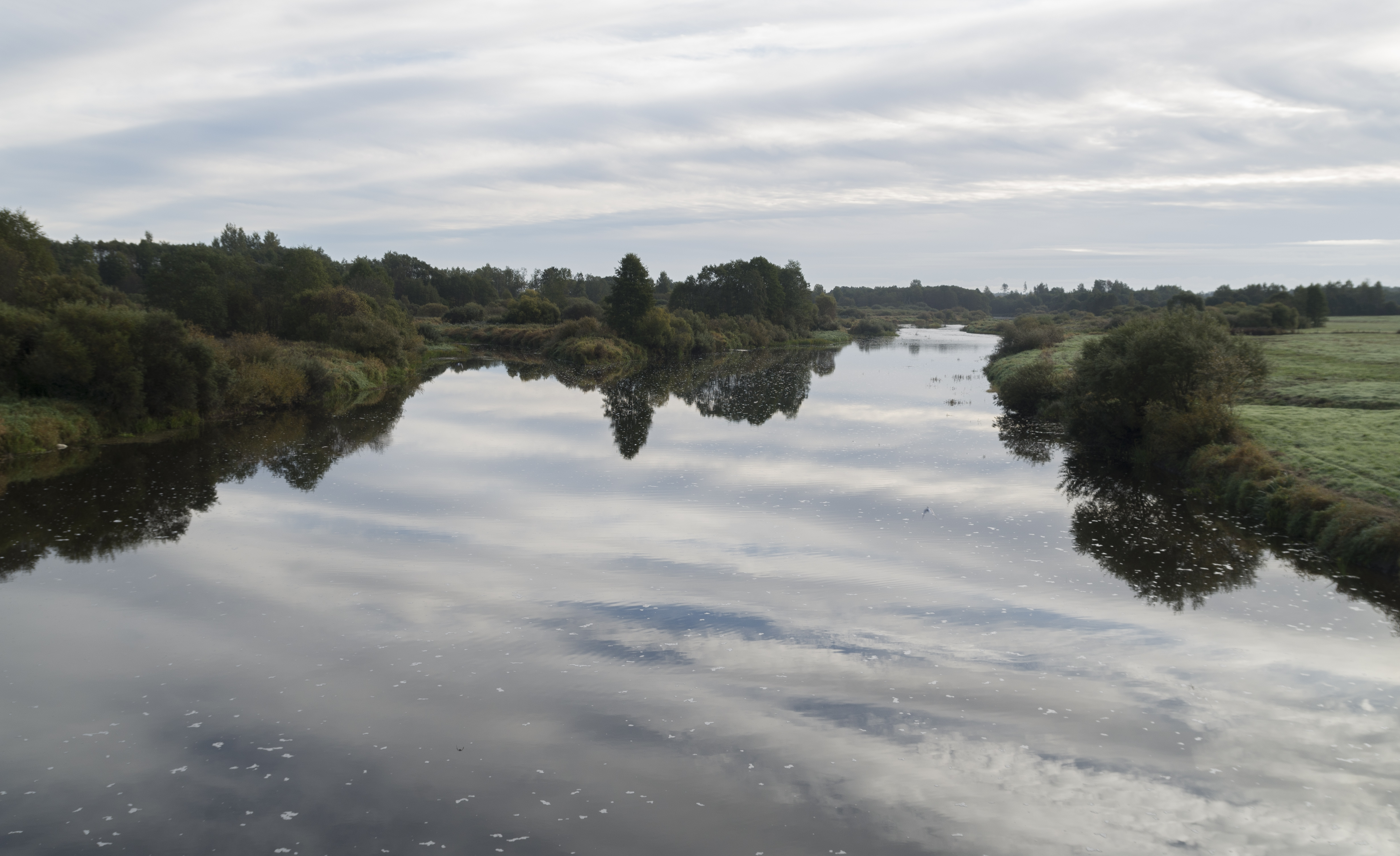
Aiviekste in Ļaudona
