= Rožkalni Parish =

Administrative unit in Latvia

- parish of Latvia
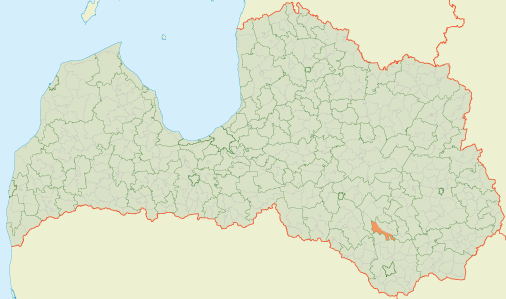
- Coordinates: 56°12′21″N 26°26′16″E
- Country: Latvia

Population (1 January 2026)
  - Total: 565

Rožkalni Parish (Latvian: Rožkalnu pagasts) is an administrative unit of Preiļi Municipality in the Latgale region of Latvia.
