= Administrative divisions of Latvia before 2009 =

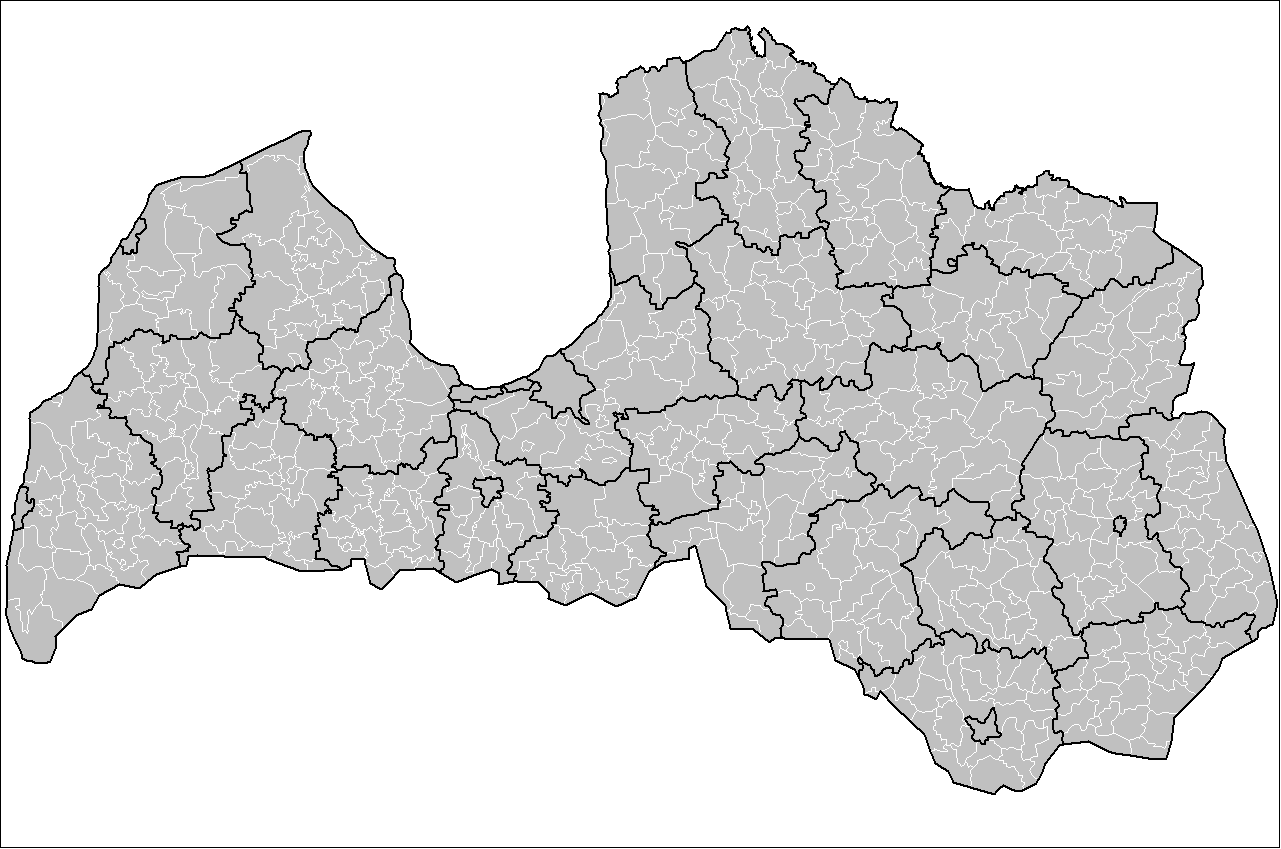
Subdivisions of Latvia

On 1 July 2009, the 26 districts of Latvia (Latvian: rajoni, sing. rajons) and 7 republic cities (republikas pilsētas, sing. republikas pilsēta), introduced in 1949 by the Soviet occupation authorities to supersede counties (apriņķi, sing. apriņķis, e.g. Rīgas apriņķis) of the Republic of Latvia, were divided into 77 cities (Latvian: pilsētas, sing. pilsēta), 10 amalgamated municipalities (Latvian: novadi, sing. novads), 24 rural territories (Latvian: lauku teritorijas, sing. lauku teritorija) and 475 parishes (Latvian: pagasti, sing. pagasts).

The previous administrative reform had been enacted in 1990 upon the restoration of the independence of Latvia, when parishes, which had been abolished from 1945 to 1949 during the Soviet occupation in favour of village councils (ciemu padomes, sing. ciema padome), were restored. The first-level administrative units of Latvia during its interwar independence – counties (apriņķi, sing. apriņķis, e.g. Riga county) were not reintroduced, although they were initially planned to be introduced in the 2009 reform.

The new divisions were in force from 2009 to 2021, when they were superseded by the 2021 reform (see Administrative divisions of Latvia).

== Aizkraukle district ==
- Aiviekste Parish
- Aizkraukle
- Bebri Parish
- Daudzese Parish
- Irši Parish
- Jaunjelgava
- Klintaine Parish
- Koknese Parish
- Kurmene Parish
- Mazzalve Parish
- Nereta Parish
- Pilskalne Parish
- Pļaviņas
- Sece Parish
- Sērene Parish
- Skrīveri Parish
- Staburags Parish
- Sunākste Parish
- Valle Parish
- Vietalva Parish
- Zalve Parish

== Alūksne district ==
- Alūksne
- Ape
- Alsviķi Parish
- Anna Parish
- Gaujiena Parish
- Ilzene Parish
- Jaunalūksne Parish
- Jaunanna Parish
- Jaunlaicene Parish
- Kalncempji Parish
- Liepna Parish
- Maliena Parish
- Mālupe Parish
- Mārkalne Parish
- Pededze Parish
- Trapene Parish
- Veclaicene Parish
- Vireši Parish
- Zeltiņi Parish
- Ziemeri Parish

== Balvi district ==
- Baltinava Parish
- Balvi
- Balvi Parish
- Bērzkalne Parish
- Bērzpils Parish
- Briežuciems Parish
- Krišjāņi Parish
- Kubuli Parish
- Kuprava Parish
- Lazdukalns Parish
- Lazduleja Parish
- Medņeva Parish
- Rugāji Parish
- Susāji Parish
- Šķilbēni Parish
- Tilža Parish
- Vectilža Parish
- Vecumi Parish
- Viļaka
- Vīksna Parish
- Žīguri Parish

== Bauska district ==
- Bauska
- Bārbele Parish
- Brunava Parish
- Ceraukste Parish
- Code Parish
- Dāviņi Parish
- Gailīši Parish
- Iecava Municipality
- Īslīce Parish
- Mežotne Parish
- Rundāle Parish
- Skaistkalne Parish
- Stelpe Parish
- Svitene Parish
- Vecsaule Parish
- Vecumnieki Parish
- Viesturi Parish

== Cēsis district ==
- Amata Municipality
- Cēsis
- Drusti Parish
- Dzērbene Parish
- Ineši Parish
- Jaunpiebalga Parish
- Kaive Parish
- Liepa Parish
- Līgatne
- Līgatne Parish
- Mārsnēni Parish
- Nītaure Parish
- Priekuļi Parish
- Raiskums Parish
- Stalbe Parish
- Straupe Parish
- Rauna Parish
- Skujene Parish
- Taurene Parish
- Vaive Parish
- Vecpiebalga Parish
- Veselava Parish
- Zaube Parish
- Zosēni Parish

== Daugavpils district ==
- Ambeļi Parish
- Biķernieki Parish
- Demene Parish
- Dubna Parish
- Dviete Parish
- Eglaine Parish
- Ilūkste
- Ilūkste Municipality
- Kalkūne Parish
- Kalupe Parish
- Laucesa Parish
- Līksna Parish
- Maļinova Parish
- Medumi Parish
- Naujene Parish
- Nīcgale Parish
- Saliena Parish
- Skrudaliena Parish
- Subate
- Svente Parish
- Tabore Parish
- Vabole Parish
- Vecsaliena Parish
- Višķi Parish

== Dobele district ==
- Annenieki Parish
- Auce
- Auri Parish
- Bēne Parish
- Bērze Parish
- Biksti Parish
- Dobele
- Dobele Parish
- Īle Parish
- Jaunbērze Parish
- Krimūna Parish
- Lielauce Parish
- Naudīte Parish
- Penkule Parish
- Tērvete Municipality
- Ukri Parish
- Vītiņi Parish
- Zebrene Parish

== Gulbene district ==
- Beļava Parish
- Dauksti Parish
- Druviena Parish
- Galgauska Parish
- Gulbene
- Litene Parish
- Lizums Parish
- Līgo Parish
- Lejasciems Parish
- Jaungulbene Parish
- Stāmeriena Parish
- Ranka Parish
- Stradi Parish
- Tirza Parish

== Jēkabpils district ==
- Aknīste
- Asare Parish
- Atašiene Parish
- Ābeļi Parish
- Dignāja Parish
- Dunava Parish
- Elkšņi Parish
- Gārsene Parish
- Jēkabpils
- Kalna Parish
- Krustpils Parish
- Kūkas Parish
- Leimaņi Parish
- Mežāre Parish
- Rite Parish
- Rubene Parish
- Sala Parish
- Sauka Parish
- Sēlpils Parish
- Varieši Parish
- Viesīte
- Vīpe Parish
- Zasa Parish

== Jelgava district ==
- Eleja Parish
- Glūda Parish
- Jaunsvirlauka Parish
- Kalnciems
- Lielplatone Parish
- Līvbērze Parish
- Ozolnieki Municipality
- Platone Parish
- Sesava Parish
- Sidrabene Parish
- Svēte Parish
- Valgunde Municipality
- Vilce Parish
- Vircava Parish
- Zaļenieki Parish

== Krāslava district ==
- Andrupene Parish
- Andzeļi Parish
- Asūne Parish
- Auleja Parish
- Bērziņi Parish
- Dagda
- Dagda Parish
- Ezernieki Parish
- Grāveri Parish
- Indra Parish
- Izvalta Parish
- Kalnieši Parish
- Kaplava Parish
- Kastuļina Parish
- Kombuļi Parish
- Konstantinova Parish
- Krāslava
- Krāslava Municipality
- Ķepova Parish
- Piedruja Parish
- Robežnieki Parish
- Skaista Parish
- Svariņi Parish
- Šķaune Parish
- Šķeltova Parish
- Ūdrīši Parish

== Kuldīga district ==
- Alsunga Parish
- Ēdole Parish
- Gudenieki Parish
- Īvande Parish
- Kabile Parish
- Kuldīga
- Kurmāle Parish
- Laidi Parish
- Nīkrāce Parish
- Padure Parish
- Pelči Parish
- Raņķi Parish
- Renda Parish
- Rudbārži Parish
- Rumba Parish
- Skrunda
- Skrunda Parish
- Snēpele Parish
- Turlava Parish
- Vārme Parish

== Liepāja district ==
- Aizpute
- Aizpute Parish
- Bārta Parish
- Bunka Parish
- Cīrava Parish
- Dunalka Parish
- Dunika Parish
- Durbe
- Durbe Municipality
- Embūte Parish
- Gavieze Parish
- Gramzda Parish
- Grobiņa
- Grobiņa Parish
- Kalēti Parish
- Kalvene Parish
- Kazdanga Parish
- Laža Parish
- Medze Parish
- Nīca Parish
- Otaņķi Parish
- Pāvilosta
- Priekule
- Priekule Parish
- Rucava Parish
- Saka Municipality
- Saka Parish
- Vaiņode Parish
- Vecpils Parish
- Vērgale Parish
- Virga Parish

== Limbaži district ==
- Ainaži
- Aloja
- Braslava Parish
- Brīvzemnieki Parish
- Katvari Parish
- Lēdurga Parish
- Liepupe Parish
- Limbaži
- Limbaži Parish
- Pāle Parish
- Salacgrīva
- Skulte Parish
- Staicele
- Vidriži Parish
- Viļķene Parish
- Umurga Parish

== Ludza district ==
- Blonti Parish
- Briģi Parish
- Cibla Municipality
- Cirma Parish
- Goliševa Parish
- Isnauda Parish
- Istra Parish
- Kārsava
- Lauderi Parish
- Ludza
- Malnava Parish
- Mežvidi Parish
- Mērdzene Parish
- Nirza Parish
- Ņukši Parish
- Pasiene Parish
- Pilda Parish
- Pureņi Parish
- Pušmucova Parish
- Rundēni Parish
- Salnava Parish
- Zilupe
- Zilupe Municipality
- Zvirgzdene Parish

== Madona district ==
- Arona Parish
- Barkava Parish
- Bērzaune Parish
- Cesvaine
- Dzelzava Parish
- Ērgļi Municipality
- Kalsnava Parish
- Lazdona Parish
- Ļaudona Parish
- Liezēre Parish
- Lubāna
- Lubāna Municipality
- Madona
- Mārciena Parish
- Mētriena Parish
- Murmastiene Parish
- Ošupe Parish
- Prauliena Parish
- Sarkaņi Parish
- Varakļāni
- Varakļāni Parish
- Vestiena Parish

== Ogre district ==
- Birzgale Parish
- Ikšķile
- Ikšķile Municipality
- Jumprava Parish
- Krape Parish
- Ķegums
- Ķegums Municipality
- Ķeipene Parish
- Laubere Parish
- Lēdmane Parish
- Lielvārde
- Lielvārde Municipality
- Madliena Parish
- Mazozoli Parish
- Meņģele Parish
- Ogre
- Ogre Municipality
- Suntaži Parish
- Taurupe Parish

== Preiļi district ==
- Aglona Parish
- Jersika Parish
- Līvāni
- Līvāni Municipality
- Pelēči Parish
- Preiļi
- Preiļi Municipality
- Riebiņi Municipality
- Rudzāti Parish
- Sauna Parish
- Sutri Parish
- Vārkava Parish
- Vārkava Municipality

== Rēzekne district ==
- Audriņi Parish
- Bērzgale Parish
- Čornaja Parish
- Dekšāres Parish
- Dricāni Parish
- Feimaņi Parish
- Gaigalava Parish
- Griškāni Parish
- Ilzeskalns Parish
- Kantinieki Parish
- Kaunata Parish
- Lendži Parish
- Lūznava Parish
- Malta Parish
- Mākoņkalns Parish
- Nagļi Parish
- Nautrēni Parish
- Ozolaine Parish
- Ozolmuiža Parish
- Puša Parish
- Rikava Parish
- Sakstagals Parish
- Silmala Parish
- Sokolki Parish
- Stoļerova Parish
- Strūžāni Parish
- Verēmi Parish
- Viļāni
- Viļāni Parish

== Riga district ==
- Ādaži Municipality
- Allaži Parish
- Babīte Parish
- Baldone
- Baloži
- Carnikava Municipality
- Daugmale Parish
- Garkalne Municipality
- Inčukalns Municipality
- Krimulda Parish
- Ķekava Parish
- Mālpils Parish
- Mārupe Parish
- Olaine
- Olaine Parish
- Ropaži Municipality
- Sala Parish
- Salaspils
- Salaspils Municipality
- Saulkrasti
- Sēja Municipality
- Sigulda
- Sigulda Municipality
- Stopiņi Municipality
- Vangaži

== Saldus district ==
- Brocēni
- Brocēni Municipality
- Ezere Parish
- Gaiķi Parish
- Jaunauce Parish
- Jaunlutriņi Parish
- Kursīši Parish
- Lutriņi Parish
- Nīgrande Parish
- Novadnieki Parish
- Pampāļi Parish
- Ruba Parish
- Saldus
- Saldus Parish
- Šķēde Parish
- Vadakste Parish
- Zaņa Parish
- Zirņi Parish
- Zvārde Parish

== Talsi district ==
- Balgale Parish
- Dundaga Parish
- Ģibuļi Parish
- Īve Parish
- Kolka Parish
- Ķūļciems Parish
- Laidze Parish
- Lauciene Parish
- Lībagi Parish
- Lube Parish
- Mērsrags Parish
- Roja Parish
- Sabile Municipality
- Stende
- Strazde Parish
- Talsi
- Valdemārpils
- Valdgale Parish
- Vandzene Parish
- Virbi Parish

== Tukums district ==
- Degole Parish
- Džūkste Parish
- Engure Parish
- Irlava Parish
- Jaunpils Parish
- Jaunsāti Parish
- Kandava
- Kandava Municipality
- Lapmežciems Municipality
- Lestene Parish
- Pūre Parish
- Sēme Parish
- Slampe Parish
- Smārde Parish
- Tukums
- Tume Parish
- Vāne Parish
- Viesati Parish
- Zante Parish
- Zentene Parish

== Valka district ==
- Bilska Parish
- Blome Parish
- Branti Parish
- Ērģeme Parish
- Ēvele Parish
- Grundzāle Parish
- Jērcēni Parish
- Kārķi Parish
- Launkalne Parish
- Palsmane Parish
- Plāņi Parish
- Seda
- Smiltene
- Smiltene Parish
- Strenči
- Trikāta Parish
- Valka
- Valka Parish
- Variņi Parish
- Vijciems Parish
- Zvārtava Parish

== Valmiera district ==
- Bērzaine Parish
- Brenguļi Parish
- Burtnieki Parish
- Burtnieki Municipality
- Dikļi Parish
- Ipiķi Parish
- Jeri Parish
- Kauguri Parish
- Kocēni Parish
- Ķoņi Parish
- Lode Parish
- Mazsalaca
- Naukšēni Parish
- Ramata Parish
- Rencēni Parish
- Rūjiena
- Sēļi Parish
- Skaņkalne Parish
- Vaidava Parish
- Valmiera
- Valmiera Parish
- Vilpulka Parish
- Zilākalns Parish

== Ventspils district ==
- Ance Parish
- Jūrkalne Parish
- Piltene
- Pope Parish
- Puze Parish
- Tārgale Parish
- Ugāle Parish
- Usma Parish
- Užava Parish
- Vārve Parish
- Ziras Parish
- Zlēkas Parish

== See also ==
- Historical Latvian Lands
- Planning regions of Latvia
