= Administrative divisions of Latvia =

The current administrative division of Latvia came into force on 1 July 2021. Previous municipal reforms after the restoration of Latvian independence were enacted in 2009 and 1990 (when parishes, which had been abolished during the Soviet occupation, were restored).

On 10 June 2020, the Saeima approved a municipal reform that would reduce the 110 municipalities and nine republic cities to 42 local government units consisting of 35 municipalities (Latvian: novadi, sing. novads) and seven state cities (valstspilsētas, sing. valstspilsēta). The municipalities are also further divided into 71 cities/towns (pilsētas, sing. pilsēta) and 512 parishes (pagasti, sing. pagasts; also rural territories).

These are not to be confused with the Historical Latvian Lands, which are classified as historical and cultural regions.

== Legislation and history ==
The main law regulating the administrative division of Latvia and local governance is the Law on Administrative Territories and Populated Areas of 2020 (Administratīvo teritoriju un apdzīvoto vietu likums).

The main legislature of the municipalities and state cities with independent governments is the Municipal Council or the dome (also 'Council of the Local Government'), which is elected every 5 years and elects the head of the municipality - the Council Chair (m. domes priekšsēdētājs / f. priekšsēdētāja, also 'Chairperson of the Council') from its ranks.

On 1 June 2021, the Constitutional Court of Latvia ruled that the annexation of Varakļāni Municipality to Rēzekne Municipality was unconstitutional. In response, the Saeima decided to preserve the existence of Varakļāni Municipality as a 43rd local government unit until 2025. On 30 June 2024 the Saeima decreed that Varakļāni Municipality will be merged into Madona Municipality immediately after the 2025 Latvian local elections. Varakļāni Municipality officially ceased to exist on 1 July 2025 with the first session of the new Madona Municipality Council.

== State cities with independent governments as of 2025 ==
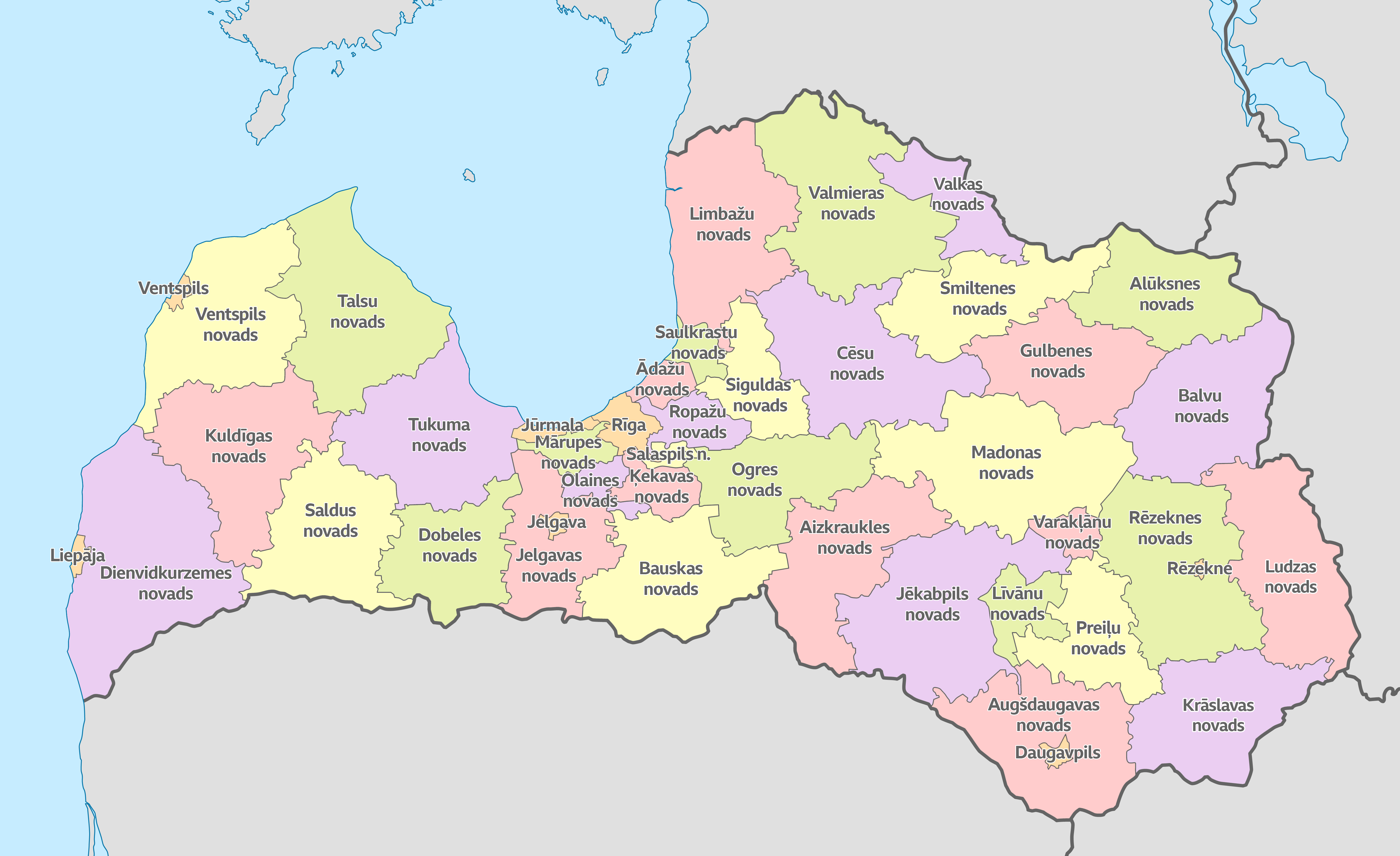
State cities and municipalities of Latvia as of 1 July 2021

State cities, municipalities, parishes and towns of Latvia as of 2022

Map of Latvian parishes and towns as of 2022

The 2020 law on administrative territories and populated areas designated Ogre and the previous nine republic cities as state cities. It also provided for the promotion of Iecava and Koknese to state city status on 1 July 2021. However, under the same law, only the seven state cities listed in the following table will have local governments which are independent of any municipality.

Of the remaining three state cities, Jēkabpils and Valmiera became part of Jēkabpils Municipality and Valmiera Municipality respectively on 1 July 2021, while Ogre is similarly a part of the Ogre Municipality.

City name	Population (2025)	GDP (mil. €), 2022	GDP per capita (€), 2022
Daugavpils	78,112	940	11,863
Jelgava	54,821	817	14,862
Jūrmala	51,933	477	9,341
Liepāja	67,398	1,174	17,403
Rēzekne	26,425	409	15,411
Riga	591,882	19,261	31,583
Ventspils	32,719	489	14,773

== Municipalities as of 2025 ==
As of 7 June 2025, there are 35 municipalities in Latvia:

Municipality	Population (2021 estimate)	Territorial units of municipality: (cities, towns, and parishes)
Ādaži	21,134	Ādaži Parish, Ādaži town, Carnikava Parish
Aizkraukle	29,367	Aiviekste Parish, Aizkraukle Parish, Aizkraukle town, Bebri Parish, Daudzese Parish, Irši Parish, Jaunjelgava Parish, Jaunjelgava town, Klintaine Parish, Koknese Parish, Koknese town, Mazzalve Parish, Nereta Parish, Pilskalne Parish, Pļaviņas town, Sece Parish, Sērene Parish, Skrīveri Parish, Staburags Parish, Sunākste Parish, Vietalva Parish, Zalve Parish
Alūksne	13,861	Alsviķi Parish, Alūksne town, Anna Parish, Ilzene Parish, Jaunalūksne Parish, Jaunanna Parish, Jaunlaicene Parish, Kalncempji Parish, Liepna Parish, Maliena Parish, Mālupe Parish, Mārkalne Parish, Pededze Parish, Veclaicene Parish, Zeltiņi Parish, Ziemeri Parish
Augšdaugava	25,927	Ambeļi Parish, Bebrene Parish, Biķernieki Parish, Demene Parish, Dubna Parish, Dviete Parish, Eglaine Parish, Ilūkste town, Kalkūne Parish, Kalupe Parish, Laucesa Parish, Līksna Parish, Maļinova Parish, Medumi Parish, Naujene Parish, Nīcgale Parish, Pilskalne Parish, Prode Parish, Saliena Parish, Skrudaliena Parish, Subate town, Svente Parish, Šēdere Parish, Tabore Parish, Vabole Parish, Vecsaliena Parish, Višķi Parish
Balvi	19,015	Baltinava Parish, Balvi Parish, Balvi town, Bērzkalne Parish, Bērzpils Parish, Briežuciems Parish, Krišjāņi Parish, Kubuli Parish, Kuprava Parish, Lazdukalns Parish, Lazduleja Parish, Medņeva Parish, Rugāji Parish, Susāji Parish, Šķilbēni Parish, Tilža Parish, Vectilža Parish, Vecumi Parish, Viļaka town, Vīksna Parish, Žīguri Parish
Bauska	41,755	Bauska town, Bārbele Parish, Brunava Parish, Ceraukste Parish, Code Parish, Dāviņi Parish, Gailīši Parish, Iecava Parish, Iecava town, Īslīce Parish, Kurmene Parish, Mežotne Parish, Rundāle Parish, Skaistkalne Parish, Stelpe Parish, Svitene Parish, Valle Parish, Vecsaule Parish, Vecumnieki Parish, Viesturi Parish
Cēsis	41,161	Amata Parish, Cēsis town, Drabeši Parish, Dzērbene Parish, Ineši Parish, Jaunpiebalga Parish, Kaive Parish, Liepa Parish, Līgatne Parish, Līgatne town, Mārsnēni Parish, Nītaure Parish, Priekuļi Parish, Raiskums Parish, Skujene Parish, Stalbe Parish, Straupe Parish, Taurene Parish, Vaive Parish, Vecpiebalga Parish, Veselava Parish, Zaube Parish, Zosēni Parish
Dobele	28,517	Annenieki Parish, Auce town, Augstkalne Parish, Auri Parish, Bēne Parish, Bērze Parish, Biksti Parish, Bukaiši Parish, Dobele Parish, Dobele town, Īle Parish, Jaunbērze Parish, Krimūna Parish, Lielauce Parish, Naudīte Parish, Penkule Parish, Tērvete Parish, Ukri Parish, Vecauce Parish, Vītiņi Parish, Zebrene Parish
Gulbene	19,619	Beļava Parish, Dauksti Parish, Druviena Parish, Galgauska Parish, Gulbene town, Jaungulbene Parish, Lejasciems Parish, Litene Parish, Lizums Parish, Līgo Parish, Ranka Parish, Stāmeriena Parish, Stradi Parish, Tirza Parish
Jelgava	31,969	Cena Parish, Eleja Parish, Glūda Parish, Jaunsvirlauka Parish, Kalnciems Parish, Lielplatone Parish, Līvbērze Parish, Ozolnieki Parish, Platone Parish, Salgale Parish, Sesava Parish, Svēte Parish, Valgunde Parish, Vilce Parish, Vircava Parish, Zaļenieki Parish
Jēkabpils	40,576	Aknīste Parish, Aknīste town, Asare Parish, Atašiene Parish, Ābeļi Parish, Dignāja Parish, Dunava Parish, Elkšņi Parish, Gārsene Parish, Jēkabpils city, Kalna Parish, Krustpils Parish, Kūkas Parish, Leimaņi Parish, Mežāre Parish, Rite Parish, Rubene Parish, Sala Parish, Sauka Parish, Sēlpils Parish, Varieši Parish, Viesīte Parish, Viesīte town, Vīpe Parish, Zasa Parish
Ķekava	30,077	Baldone Parish, Baldone town, Baloži town, Daugmale Parish, Ķekava Parish, Ķekava town
Krāslava	21,459	Andrupene Parish, Andzeļi Parish, Asūne Parish, Auleja Parish, Bērziņi Parish, Dagda Parish, Dagda town, Ezernieki Parish, Grāveri Parish, Indra Parish, Izvalta Parish, Kalnieši Parish, Kaplava Parish, Kastuļina Parish, Kombuļi Parish, Konstantinova Parish, Krāslava Parish, Krāslava town, Ķepova Parish, Piedruja Parish, Robežnieki Parish, Skaista Parish, Svariņi Parish, Šķaune Parish, Šķeltova Parish, Ūdrīši Parish
Kuldīga	27,736	Alsunga Parish, Ēdole Parish, Gudenieki Parish, Īvande Parish, Kabile Parish, Kuldīga town, Kurmāle Parish, Laidi Parish, Nīkrāce Parish, Padure Parish, Pelči Parish, Raņķi Parish, Renda Parish, Rudbārži Parish, Rumba Parish, Skrunda Parish, Skrunda town, Snēpele Parish, Turlava Parish, Vārme Parish
Limbaži	28,546	Ainaži Parish, Ainaži town, Aloja Parish, Aloja town, Braslava Parish, Brīvzemnieki Parish, Katvari Parish, Liepupe Parish, Limbaži Parish, Limbaži town, Pāle Parish, Salacgrīva Parish, Salacgrīva town, Skulte Parish, Staicele Parish, Staicele town, Umurga Parish, Vidriži Parish, Viļķene Parish
Līvāni	10,636	Jersika Parish, Līvāni town, Rožupe Parish, Rudzāti Parish, Sutri Parish, Turki Parish
Ludza	21,777	Blonti Parish, Briģi Parish, Cibla Parish, Cirma Parish, Goliševa Parish, Isnauda Parish, Istra Parish, Kārsava town, Lauderi Parish, Līdumnieki Parish, Ludza town, Malnava Parish, Mežvidi Parish, Mērdzene Parish, Nirza Parish, Ņukši Parish, Pasiene Parish, Pilda Parish, Pureņi Parish, Pušmucova Parish, Rundēni Parish, Salnava Parish, Zaļesje Parish, Zilupe town, Zvirgzdene Parish
Madona	31,637	Arona Parish, Barkava Parish, Bērzaune Parish, Cesvaine Parish, Cesvaine town, Dzelzava Parish, Ērgļi Parish, Indrāni Parish, Jumurda Parish, Kalsnava Parish, Lazdona Parish, Liezēre Parish, Lubāna town, Ļaudona Parish, Madona town, Mārciena Parish, Mētriena Parish, Murmastiene Parish, Ošupe Parish, Prauliena Parish, Sarkaņi Parish, Sausnēja Parish, Varakļāni Parish, Varakļāni town, Vestiena Parish
Mārupe	32,824	Babīte Parish, Mārupe Parish, Mārupe town, Sala Parish
Ogre	57,617	Birzgale Parish, Ikšķile town, Jumprava Parish, Krape Parish, Ķegums town, Ķeipene Parish, Laubere Parish, Lēdmane Parish, Lielvārde Parish, Lielvārde town, Madliena Parish, Mazozoli Parish, Meņģele Parish, Ogre city, Ogresgals Parish, Rembates Parish, Suntaži Parish, Taurupe Parish, Tīnūži Parish, Tome Parish
Olaine	19,705	Olaine Parish, Olaine town
Preiļi	16,759	Aglona Parish, Aizkalne Parish, Galēni Parish, Pelēči Parish, Preiļi Parish, Preiļi town, Riebiņi Parish, Rožkalni Parish, Rušona Parish, Sauna Parish, Silajāņi Parish, Sīļukalns Parish, Stabulnieki Parish, Upmala Parish, Vārkava Parish
Rēzekne	29,643	Audriņi Parish, Bērzgale Parish, Čornaja Parish, Dricāni Parish, Feimaņi Parish, Gaigalava Parish, Griškāni Parish, Ilzeskalns Parish, Kantinieki Parish, Kaunata Parish, Lendži Parish, Lūznava Parish, Mākoņkalns Parish, Malta Parish, Nagļi Parish, Nautrēni Parish, Ozolaine Parish, Ozolmuiža Parish, Puša Parish, Rikava Parish, Sakstagals Parish, Silmala Parish, Stoļerova Parish, Strūžāni Parish, Vērēmi Parish, Dekšāres Parish, Sokolki Parish, Viļāni Parish, Viļāni town
Ropaži	31,697	Garkalne Parish, Ropaži Parish, Stopiņi Parish, Vangaži town
Salaspils	22,868	Salaspils Parish, Salaspils town
Saldus	27,110	Blīdene Parish, Brocēni town, Ciecere Parish, Ezere Parish, Gaiķi Parish, Jaunauce Parish, Jaunlutriņi Parish, Kursīši Parish, Lutriņi Parish, Nīgrande Parish, Novadnieki Parish, Pampāļi Parish, Remte Parish, Ruba Parish, Saldus Parish, Saldus town, Šķēde Parish, Vadakste Parish, Zaņa Parish, Zirņi Parish, Zvārde Parish
Saulkrasti	9,230	Saulkrasti Parish, Saulkrasti town, Sēja Parish
Sigulda	30,625	Allaži Parish, Inčukalns Parish, Krimulda Parish, Lēdurga Parish, Mālpils Parish, More Parish, Sigulda Parish, Sigulda town
Smiltene	18,155	Ape Parish, Ape town, Bilska Parish, Blome Parish, Branti Parish, Drusti Parish, Gaujiena Parish, Grundzāle Parish, Launkalne Parish, Palsmane Parish, Rauna Parish, Smiltene Parish, Smiltene town, Trapene Parish, Variņi Parish, Vireši Parish
South Kurzeme	33,364	Aizpute Parish, Aizpute town, Bārta Parish, Bunka Parish, Cīrava Parish, Dunalka Parish, Dunika Parish, Durbe Parish, Durbe town, Embūte Parish, Gavieze Parish, Gramzda Parish, Grobiņa Parish, Grobiņa town, Kalēti Parish, Kalvene Parish, Kazdanga Parish, Laža Parish, Medze Parish, Nīca Parish, Otaņķi Parish, Pāvilosta town, Priekule Parish, Priekule town, Rucava Parish, Saka Parish, Tadaiķi Parish, Vaiņode Parish, Vecpils Parish, Vērgale Parish, Virga Parish
Talsi	35,699	Abava Parish, Ārlava Parish, Balgale Parish, Dundaga Parish, Ģibuļi Parish, Īve Parish, Kolka Parish, Ķūļciems Parish, Laidze Parish, Lauciene Parish, Lībagi Parish, Lube Parish, Mērsrags Parish, Roja Parish, Sabile town, Stende town, Strazde Parish, Talsi town, Valdemārpils town, Valdgale Parish, Vandzene Parish, Virbi Parish
Tukums	44,411	Cēres Parish, Degole Parish, Džūkste Parish, Engure Parish, Irlava Parish, Jaunpils Parish, Jaunsāti Parish, Kandava Parish, Kandava town, Lapmežciems Parish, Lestene Parish, Matkule Parish, Pūre Parish, Sēme Parish, Slampe Parish, Smārde Parish, Tukums town, Tume Parish, Vāne Parish, Viesati Parish, Zante Parish, Zemīte Parish, Zentene Parish
Valka	7,596	Ērģeme Parish, Kārķi Parish, Valka Parish, Valka town, Vijciems Parish, Zvārtava Parish
Valmiera	51,370	Bērzaine Parish, Brenguļi Parish, Burtnieki Parish, Dikļi Parish, Ēvele Parish, Ipiķi Parish, Jeri Parish, Jērcēni Parish, Kauguri Parish, Kocēni Parish, Ķoņi Parish, Lode Parish, Matīši Parish, Mazsalaca Parish, Mazsalaca town, Naukšēni Parish, Plāņi Parish, Ramata Parish, Rencēni Parish, Rūjiena town, Seda town, Sēļi Parish, Skaņkalne Parish, Strenči town, Trikāta Parish, Vaidava Parish, Valmiera Parish, Valmiera city, Vecate Parish, Vilpulka Parish, Zilākalns Parish
Ventspils	10,777	Ance Parish, Jūrkalne Parish, Piltene Parish, Piltene town, Pope Parish, Puze Parish, Tārgale Parish, Ugāle Parish, Usma Parish, Užava Parish, Vārve Parish, Ziras Parish, Zlēkas Parish

== See also ==
- Administrative divisions of Latvia (2009–2021)
- Administrative divisions of Latvia before 2009
