= Viļāni Municipality =

Municipality of Latvia

Coordinates: 56°40′N 26°55′E

Viļāni Municipality Viļānu novads
- Municipality
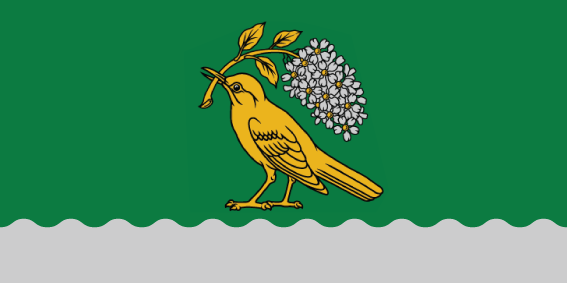
- Flag Coat of arms

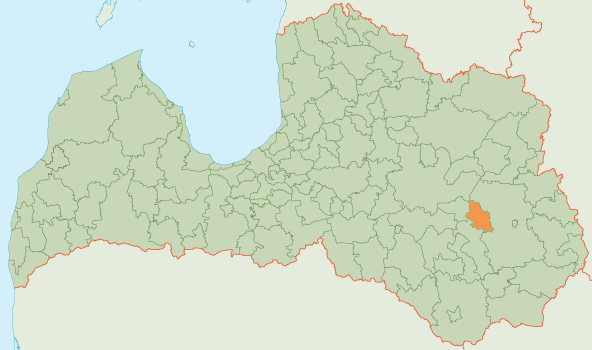
- Country: Latvia
- Formed: 2009
- Centre: Viļāni

Government
  - Council Chair: Jekaterina Ivanova (S)

Area
  - Total: 286.82 km^{2} (110.74 sq mi)
  - Land: 281.13 km^{2} (108.54 sq mi)
  - Water: 5.69 km^{2} (2.20 sq mi)

Population (2021)
  - Total: 5,399
  - Density: 19.20/km^{2} (49.74/sq mi)
- Website: www.vilanunovads.lv

Viļāni Municipality (Latvian: Viļānu novads) is a former municipality in Latgale, Latvia. The municipality was formed in 2009 by merging Dekšāres Parish, Sokolki Parish, Viļāni Parish and Viļāni town; the administrative centre being Viļāni. The population as of 2020 was 5,417.

On 1 July 2021, Viļāni Municipality ceased to exist and its territory was merged into Rēzekne Municipality.

== See also ==
- Administrative divisions of Latvia (2009)
