= Rāzna National Park =

National park in Latvia

- Rāznas Nacionālais Parks
- IUCN category II (national park)
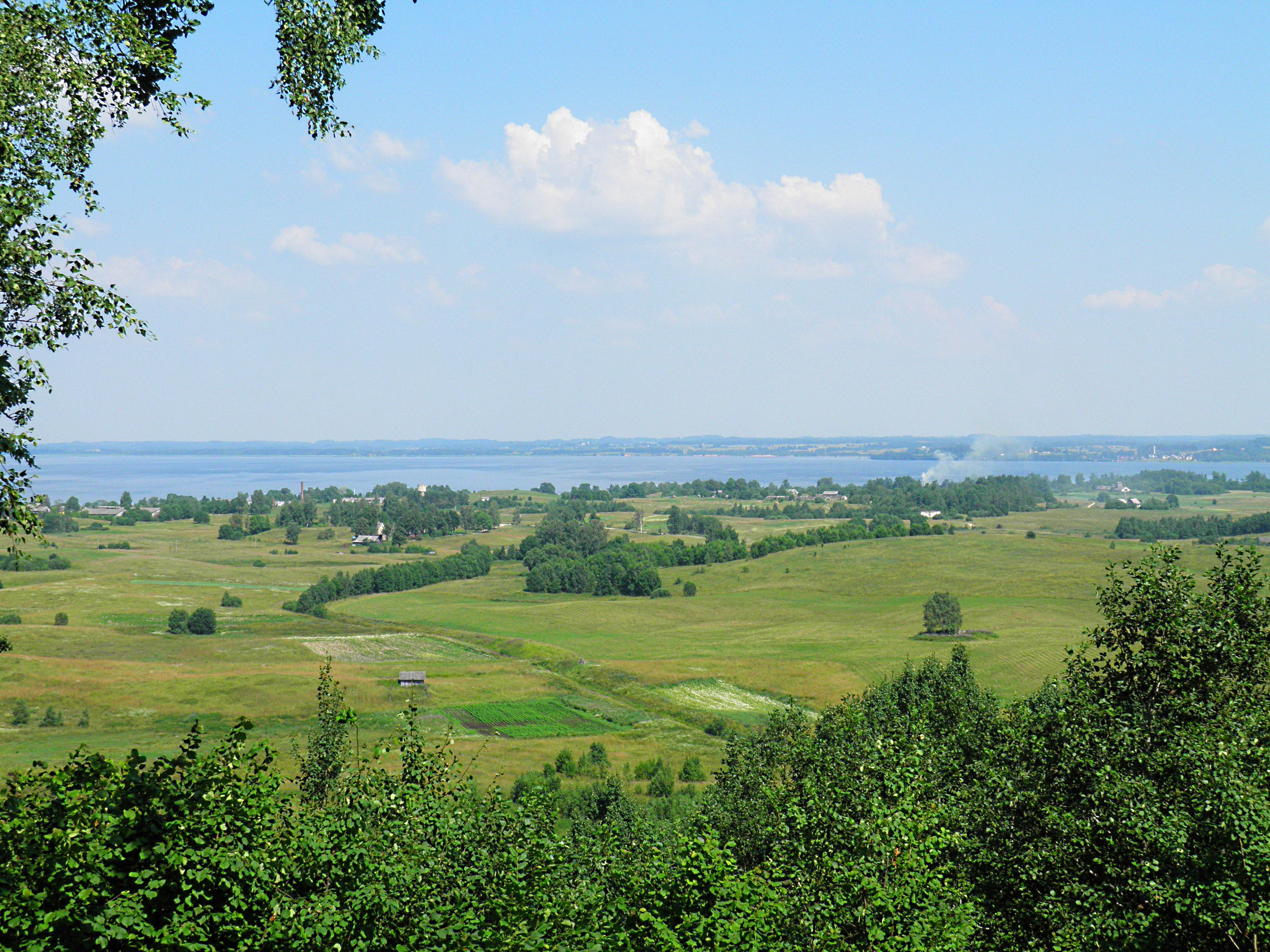
- View from Mākoņkalns hill to Lake Rāzna

- Location within Latvia
- Interactive map of Rāzna National Park
- Location: Latgale, Latvia
- Nearest city: Rēzekne
- Coordinates: 56°16′N 27°30′E
- Area: 596.14 km^{2} (230.17 sq mi)
- Established: 2007
- Administrator: Nature Conservation Agency
- Website: www.daba.gov.lv/lv/raznas-nacionalais-parks

Rāzna National Park (Latvian: Rāznas Nacionālais parks) is a national park in the Latgale region of Latvia. The park was established on 1 January 2007 in the Latgale Highlands of eastern Latvia to safeguard Lake Rāzna and its surrounding landscapes. Covering 596 km^{2}, it is the youngest and second largest of Latvia’s four national parks, spanning parts of the Rezekne, Ludza and Krāslava municipalities across the Andrupene, Andzeļi, Čornaja, Ezernieki, Kaunata, Lūznava, Mākoņkalns and Rundēni parishes. The park encompasses a resident population of roughly 5,000 people, most of whom live on privately owned land within its boundaries.

The park's topography reflects its glacial origins, featuring rolling hills, moraine ridges and over twenty lakes. Lake Rāzna itself is the country's second largest by surface area (57.6 km^{2}) and largest by volume (0.405 km^{3}), feeding the headwaters of the Rēzekne River. Surrounding habitats form a mosaic of mixed deciduous and coniferous forest, wetlands, grasslands and agricultural land, all set within a hilly relief shaped by ice-age processes some 16,000 years ago.

Management within Rāzna National Park is divided into four zones: a core nature reserve (roughly 6 % of the area), a national park zone where low-intensity forestry and farming are permitted, a landscape protection zone preserving traditional land-use patterns, and a minimal-regulation zone that allows natural evolution of human-influenced areas. The park forms part of an EU-designated Important Bird Area, hosting more than 340 bird species—including great bittern (Botaurus stellaris) and several grebes—as well as mammals such as Eurasian beaver (Castor fiber), Eurasian otter (Lutra lutra) and grey wolf (Canis lupus).

== Public perception and governance ==
Although Rāzna National Park was created to safeguard habitats of European importance, a number of land-owners and municipal officials have expressed concern that routine land-management practices—such as mowing, controlled burning or even cutting a few trees—can trigger cumbersome permit procedures or fines. Misunderstandings about what is and is not allowed have given rise to a widespread belief in "prohibitions that don't exist", which in turn discourages some traditional management techniques vital for maintaining semi-natural meadows and wetlands.

Ivars Pavasars (2014) describes this as a clash of "two realities" in Latvian protected-area governance: the official, science-driven framework of Natura 2000 on one hand, and the everyday concerns of rural inhabitants on the other. He finds that top-down decision-making, limited public involvement and a general mistrust of state institutions can hamper both compliance with conservation objectives and the long-term viability of traditional land uses that benefit biodiversity.

In response, the Nature Conservation Agency has begun pilot initiatives—such as training local volunteer rangers and hosting outreach meetings—to improve dialogue and build trust. Continued efforts to clarify permit requirements and involve local stakeholders in management planning will be essential to reconcile scientific conservation goals with the practical needs of park residents.

== See also ==
- List of national parks in the Baltics
