= Rēzekne Municipality =

Municipality of Latvia

Coordinates: 56°30′46″N 27°20′34″E

Rēzekne Municipality Rēzeknes novads
- Municipality
- Flag Coat of arms

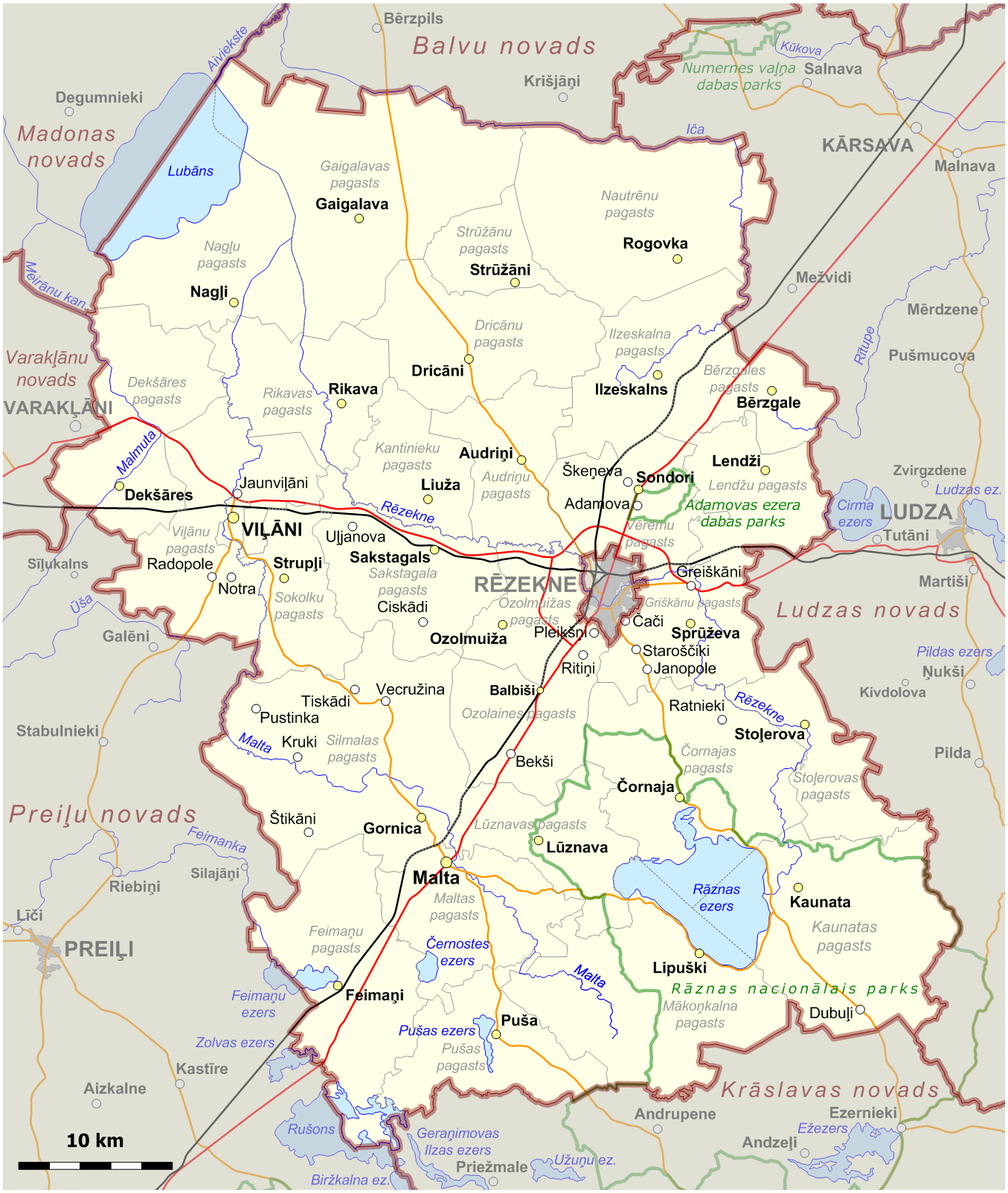
- Country: Latvia
- Formed: 2009
- Reformed: 2021
- Centre: Rēzekne (extraterritorially)

Government
  - Council Chair: Guntars Skudra (V)

Area
  - Total: 2,810.90 km^{2} (1,085.29 sq mi)
  - Land: 2,576.14 km^{2} (994.65 sq mi)

Population (2026)
  - Total: 27,268
  - Density: 10.585/km^{2} (27.415/sq mi)
- Website: www.rezeknesnovads.lv

Rēzekne Municipality (Latvian: Rēzeknes novads) is a municipality in Latgale, Latvia. The centre of the municipality is Rēzekne, which is located outside its borders. The municipality was formed in 2009 by merging municipalities of the former Rēzekne district with an expansion in 2021. The population in 2020 was 24,127.

== Subdivisions ==
Audriņi Parish, Bērzgale Parish, Čornaja Parish, Dekšāres Parish, Dricāni Parish, Feimaņi Parish, Gaigalava Parish, Griškāni Parish, Ilzeskalns Parish, Kantinieki Parish, Kaunata Parish, Lendži Parish, Lūznava Parish, Mākoņkalns Parish, Malta Parish, Nagļi Parish, Nautrēni Parish, Ozolaine Parish, Ozolmuiža Parish, Puša Parish, Rikava Parish, Sakstagals Parish, Silmala Parish, Sokolki Parish, Stoļerova Parish, Strūžāni Parish, Vērēmi Parish, Viļāni Parish, Viļāni town.

== 2021 reform ==
Within the 2021 Latvian administrative reform, Viļāni Municipality was merged into Rēzekne Municipality.

It was initially planned to merge Varakļāni Municipality into Rēzekne Municipality as well, but, after protests from the local community, parts of which wanted to preserve the status quo or preferred joining Madona Municipality, the municipal council submitted a case to the Constitutional Court of Latvia in June 2020. On 28 May 2021 the court declared the planned merge is unconstitutional. However, on June 31 the Saeima voted to proceed with the merge, which prompted the involvement of the President of Latvia Egils Levits to avoid triggering a constitutional crisis. Ultimately, a decision was made to postpone the decision on the future of the Varakļāni and Rēzekne municipalities until 2025. Due to this, the 2021 Latvian local elections for the new municipalities were also held in Varakļāni. In 2024, it was decided that Varakļāni Municipality would be merged into Madona Municipality from 1 July 2025.

== Twin towns — sister cities ==
Rēzekne Municipality is twinned with:

- Aust-Agder, Norway
- Biržai, Lithuania
- Edineț, Moldova
- Gölbaşı, Turkey
- Kupiškis, Lithuania
- Pastavy, Belarus
- Polotsk, Belarus
- Zgierz, Poland

== Notable people ==
- Francis Trasuns (1864 in Sakstagals Parish – 1926), a Latgalian priest, theologian and politician; he promoted and protected of the Latgalian language and culture.
- Emīlija Gudriniece (1920 in Kaunata Parish – 2004), a Soviet and Latvian chemist, specialized in organic synthesis of furacilin
- Terēzija Broka (1925 in Viļāni parish – 2018), a Latvian conductor, educator and culture worker.
- Jānis Pujāts (1925 in Gaigalava Parish - 1988), a Latgalian art historian, who popularised Latgalian pottery
- Jānis Pujats (born 1930 in Nautrēni Parish), a Catholic prelate and Cardinal, Archbishop of Riga, 1991 to 2010.
- Jāzeps Pīgoznis (1934 in Latgale – 2014), was a Latvian and Latgalian painter and landscape artist
- Antons Kūkojs (1940 in Nautrēni Parish – 2007), a Latvian and Latgalian poet, painter and theatre director.
- Viktors Lācis (born 1977), a middle-distance and 800 metres runner who participated in the 2000 Summer Olympics
