= Antons Kūkojs =

Latvian and Latgalian poet, painter

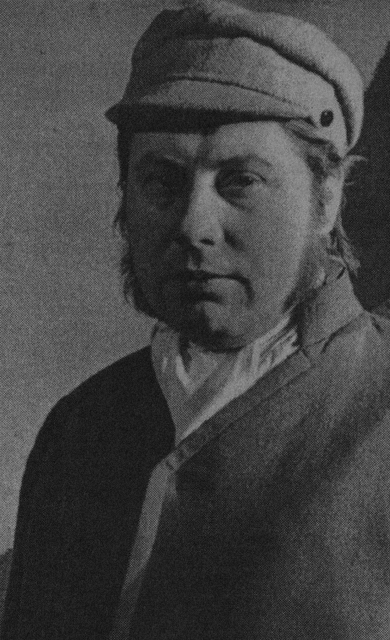
- Kūkojs in 1976
- Born: 23 December 1940; Nautrēni Parish, Latvian SSR
- Died: 18 April 2007 (aged 66); Nautrēni Parish, Latvia
- Education: Art Academy of Latvia
- Occupations: Poet; Playwright; Theatre director
- Writing career
- Genre: Dramaturgy
- Notable awards: Order of the Three Stars (2000)

Antons Kūkojs (Latgalian: Ontons Kūkojs; 23 December 1940 – 18 April July 2007) was a Latvian and Latgalian poet, painter and theatre director. In 2000, he was awarded with the Order of the Three Stars.

== Biography ==
Antons Kūkojs was born on 23 December 1940 in Nautrēni Parish (present-day Rēzekne Municipality), Latvia. His father was a blacksmith. From 1962 to 1964, he studied in the Art Academy of Latvia. From 1965 to 1980, Kūkojs was a scenographer, playwright and actor in Rēzekne People's Theatre. He was a playwright and actor in the popular play Wedding in Latgale. In 1974, in a tour in Talsi, this play was watched by 16 000 spectators.

As a painter, Kūkojs works were selected for the exhibitions in Art Academy of Latvia in 1959. In 1965, his painting Morning in Rēzekne was displayed in the exhibitions in United Kingdom and France. In 1967, he had a personal art exhibition in Rēzekne.

Since 1991, he was a member of the Latvian Writers Union and until 2004, the director of Ludza Arts School.

On 4 April 2000, Kūkojs was awarded with the Order of the Three Stars for his contributions and achievements in the Latvian and Latgalian culture.

Kūkojs died in Nautrēni Parish on 18 April 2007, at the age of 66 after battling an illness.

== Legacy ==
Kūkojs is regarded as one of the greats of the Latgalian culture. He wrote poems in Latgalian language and depicted Latgale in his paintings. Alongside Jānis Pujāts, Kūkojs helped to organize exhibitions and promote Latgalian ceramics in the Soviet period. On 8 August 2012, the sculpture of Kūkojs was opened in Rēzekne nearby the Latgale Culture History Museum.

== Honors ==
- 2000: Order of the Three Stars
