= Andzeļi Parish =

Parish in Krāslava Municipality, Latvia

- parish of Latvia
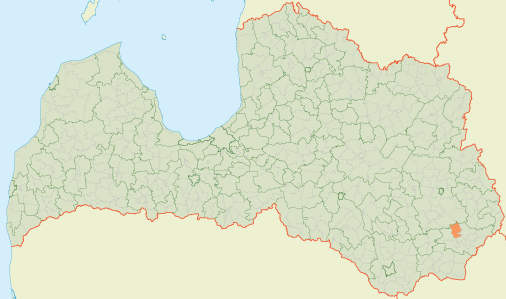
- 56°11′16″N 27°31′38″E
- Country: Latvia

Area
  - Total: 96.28 km^{2} (37.17 sq mi)
  - Land: 91.31 km^{2} (35.25 sq mi)
  - Water: 4.97 km^{2} (1.92 sq mi)

Population (1 January 2024)
  - Total: 438
  - Density: 4.5/km^{2} (12/sq mi)

Andzeļi Parish (Latvian: Andzeļu pagasts) is an administrative unit of Krāslava Municipality in the Latgale region of Latvia. It borders with the Ezernieki, Dagda and Andrupene parishes of its own municipality and Mākoņkalns and Kaunata parishes of Rēzekne Municipality. The parish center is located in Andzeļi.
