= Francis Trasuns =

Latvian Catholic priest and politician (1864–1926)

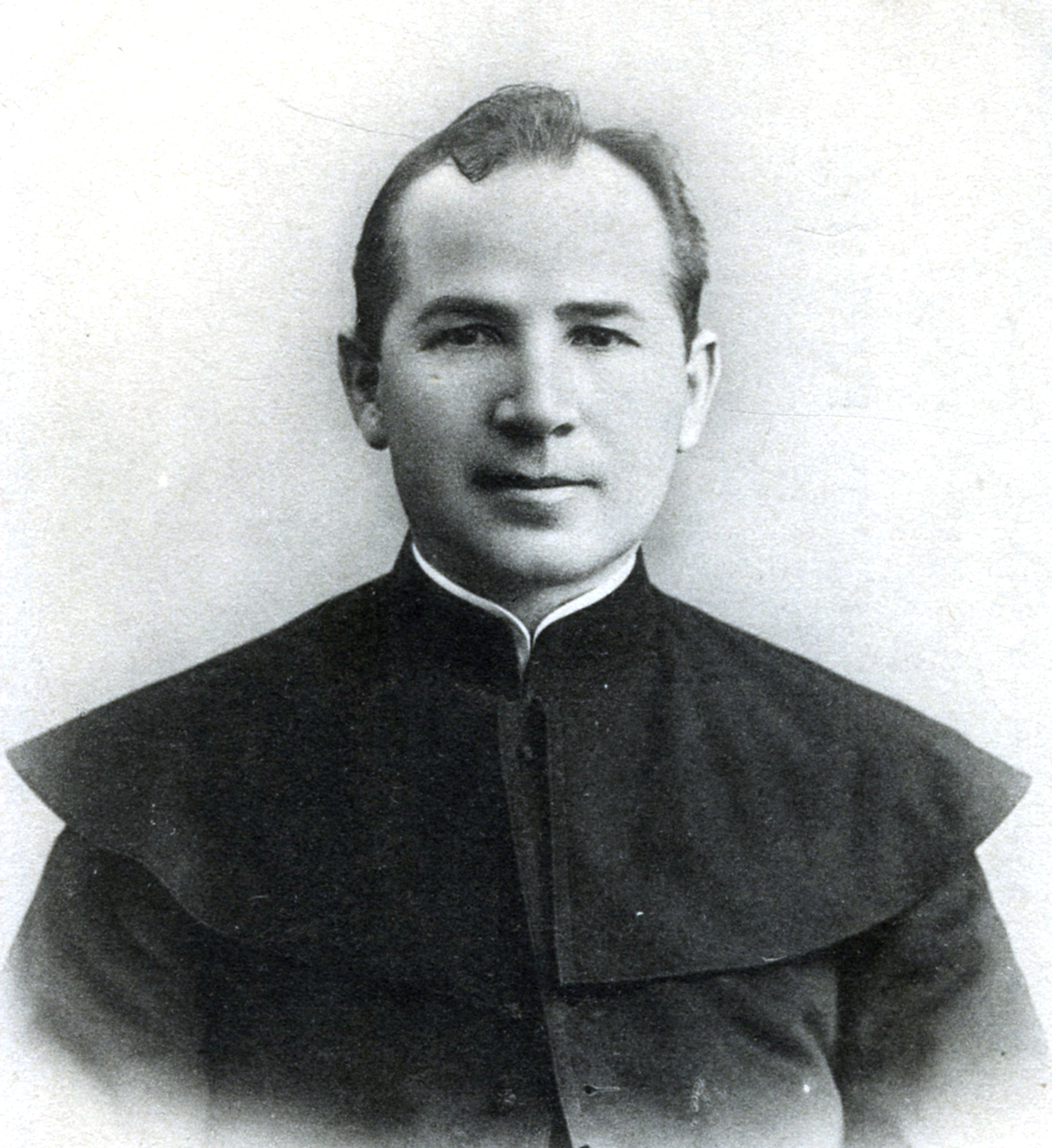
- Francis Trasuns in 1906
- Born: October 16, 1864; Sakstagals Parish, Vitebsk Governorate, Russian Empire
- Died: April 6, 1926 (aged 61); Riga, Latvia
- Education: Saint Petersburg Roman Catholic Theological Academy
- Occupations: Priest, theologian, politician

Signature
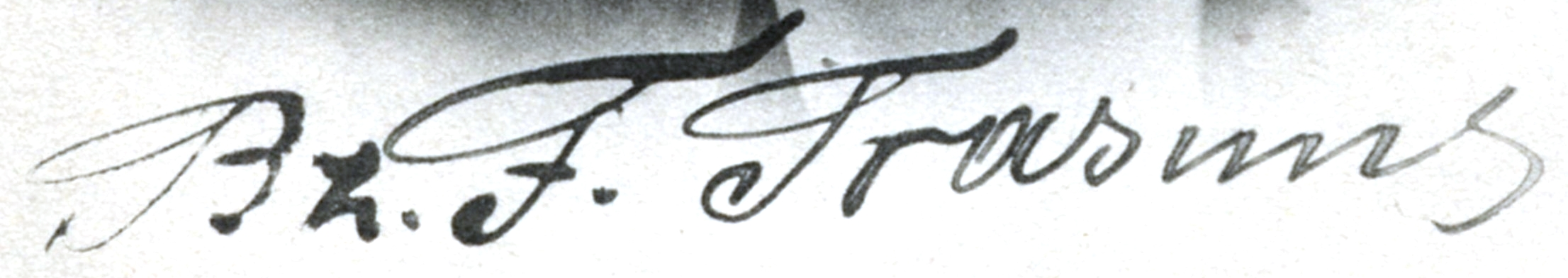

Francis Trasuns (Russian: Франц Станисла́вович Тра́сун; October 16, 1864 – April 6, 1926) was a Latgalian priest, theologian and politician. He was a member of the State Duma of the Russian Empire (in 1906) and a member of the Latvian parliament (1922–1926). All his life, Trasuns was an active promoter and protector of the Latgalian language and culture.

== Early life and education ==
Trasuns was a student of the Jelgava Gymnasium, then from 1883 to 1887 he studied in Saint Petersburg's theological seminary, and eventually, in 1887, he joined the Saint Petersburg Roman Catholic Theological Academy and graduated it in 1891. From 1902, Trasuns worked as a professor in the Saint Petersburg's theological seminary. One of his achievements was that some of his lectures were held in the Latgalian language.
