= Saka Municipality =

Coordinates: 56°51′22″N 21°16′24″E

Saka municipality (Latvian: Sakas novads) was an administrative territorial entity of the Liepāja district, Latvia (2004 - 2009). Since the 2009 administrative reforms it has been in Pāvilosta municipality.

== See also ==
- Administrative divisions of Latvia before 2009
