= Terēzija Broka =

Latvian conductor, educator, and culture worker (1925–2018)

Terēzija Broka, also known as Terēze Broka, (September 30, 1925 in Viļāni parish, Latvia – October 22, 2018) was a Latvian conductor, educator and culture worker. Broka was awarded the Order of the Three Stars in 1995 for promotion of Latgalian culture. Broka was chief conductor in three successive Latvian Song and Dance Festivals.
