= Jāzeps Pīgoznis =

Latvian painter

- Born: 15 September 1934; Ružina Parish
- Died: 28 May 2014 (aged 80)
- Known for: Painting
- Movement: Landscape
- Awards: Order of the Three Stars (2011)

Jāzeps Pīgoznis (15 September 1934 – 28 May 2014) was a Latvian and Latgalian painter, landscape artist and professor of drawing at the Art Academy of Latvia from 1972 until 1986. He was awarded the Order of the Three Stars in 2011.

Pīgoznis was born on 15 September 1934 in Ruzhina Parish, present-day Rēzekne Municipality, Latgale. From 1953 to 1959, he studied in the Latvian Academy of Arts. Throughout his artistic career, Pīgoznis had more than 25 personal exhibitions in Latvia and abroad. He died on 28 May 2014, at the age of 79.
