= Otaņķi Parish =

Parish of Latvia

- parish of Latvia
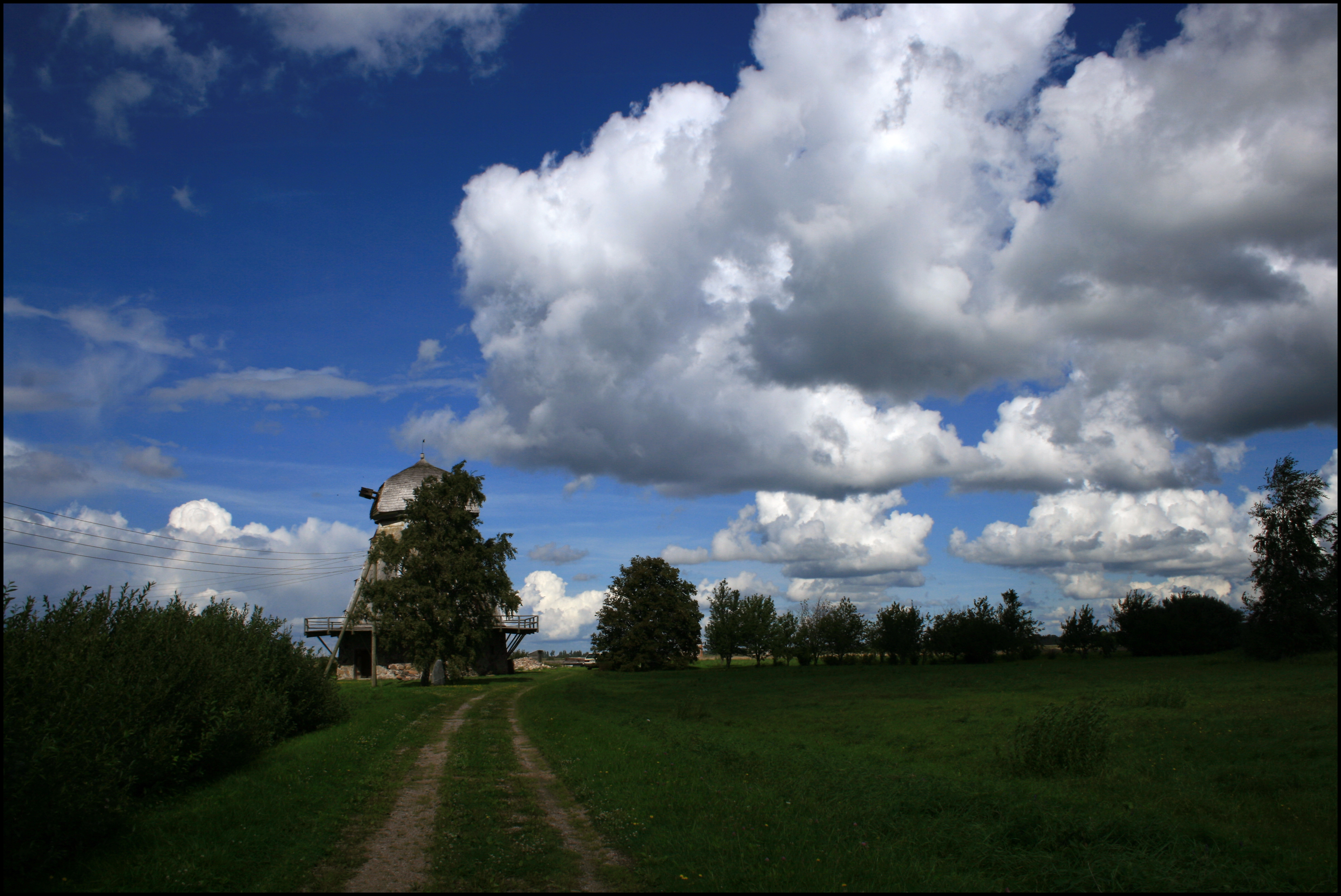

- Coat of arms

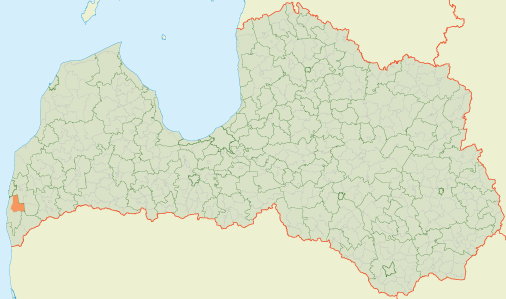
- 56°24′30″N 21°07′23″E

- Location within Latvia
- Country: Latvia

Area
  - Total: 120.29 km^{2} (46.44 sq mi)
  - Land: 106.19 km^{2} (41.00 sq mi)
  - Water: 14.1 km^{2} (5.4 sq mi)

Population (1 January 2026)
  - Total: 748
  - Density: 7.04/km^{2} (18.2/sq mi)

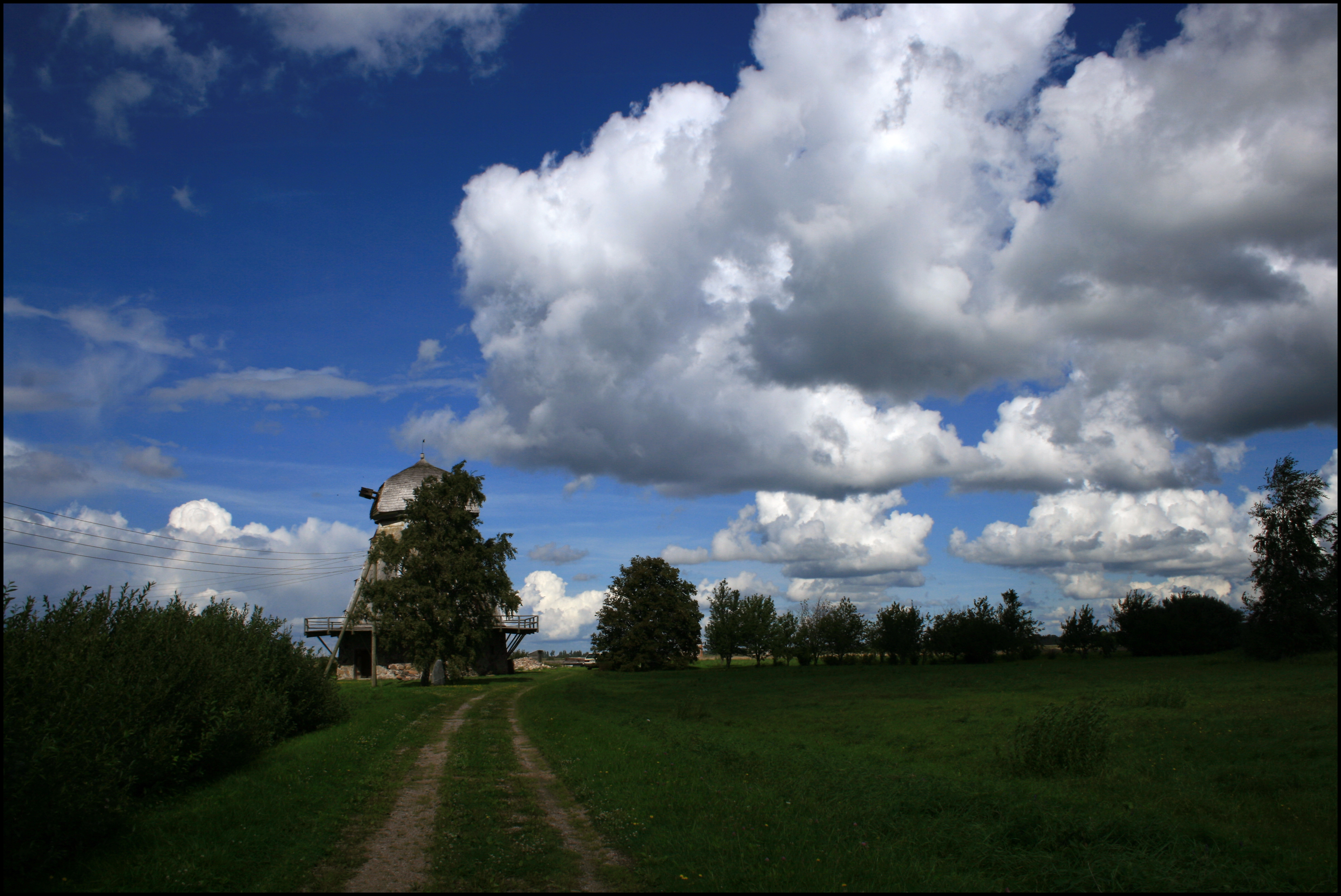
Rudes windmill at Otanki.

Otaņķi Parish (Latvian: Otaņķu pagasts) is an administrative unit of South Kurzeme Municipality in the Courland region of Latvia. The parish has a population of 962 (as of 1/07/2010) and covers an area of 120.5 km^{2}.

== Villages of Otaņķi Parish ==
- Baidzele
- Banažgals
- Dorupe
- Laukgals
- Laurciems
- Mežgals
- Otaņķi
- Rude
- Rumbasgals
- Šķuburi
- Upmaļciems
