= Pušmucova Parish =

Parish of Latvia

- parish of Latvia
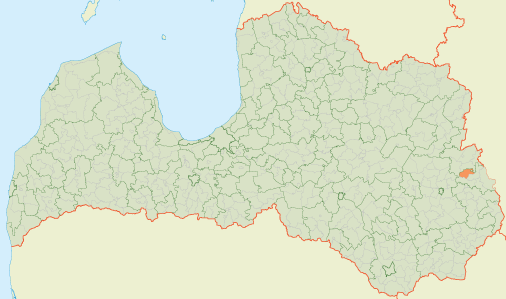
- 56°38′41″N 27°43′25″E
- Country: Latvia

Area
  - Total: 72.42 km^{2} (27.96 sq mi)
  - Land: 71.08 km^{2} (27.44 sq mi)
  - Water: 1.34 km^{2} (0.52 sq mi)

Population (1 January 2024)
  - Total: 431
  - Density: 6.0/km^{2} (15/sq mi)

Pušmucova Parish (Latvian: Pušmucovas pagasts) is an administrative unit of Ludza Municipality in the Latgale region of Latvia.
