= Nagļi Parish =

Parish of Latvia

- parish of Latvia
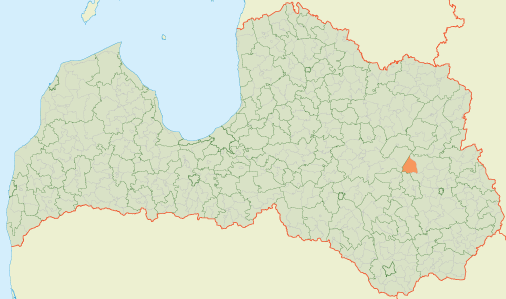
- Coordinates: 56°43′16″N 26°54′00″E
- Country: Latvia

Population (1 January 2026)
  - Total: 338
- Time zone: Eastern European Time

Nagļi Parish (Latvian: Nagļu pagasts) is an administrative division of Rēzekne Municipality, Latvia.
