= Sabile Municipality =

- former municipality of Latvia
- Interactive map of Sabile Municipality
- Coordinates: 57°03′N 22°35′E
- Country: Latvia

Sabile Municipality (Latvian: Sabiles novads) was an administrative unit (2000–2009) of the Talsi district, Latvia.

== Towns, villages and settlements of Sabile Municipality ==
- Sabile
- Valgale
- Veģi
- Lielvirbi
