= Mārciena Parish =

Parish of Latvia

- parish of Latvia
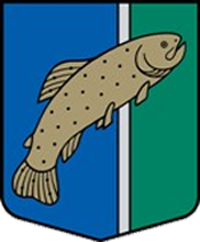
- Coat of arms

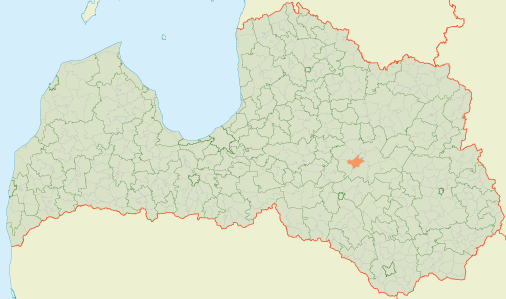
- 56°46′25″N 26°06′09″E

- Location within Latvia
- Country: Latvia

Area
  - Total: 89.68 km^{2} (34.63 sq mi)
  - Land: 85.48 km^{2} (33.00 sq mi)
  - Water: 4.2 km^{2} (1.6 sq mi)

Population (1 January 2026)
  - Total: 817
  - Density: 9.56/km^{2} (24.8/sq mi)
- Website: www.marciena.lv

Mārciena parish (Latvian: Mārcienas pagasts) is an administrative unit of Madona Municipality, Latvia.

== Towns, villages and settlements of Mārciena parish ==
- Ķepši (Kepsi)
