= Zvārtava Parish =

Parish of Latvia

- parish of Latvia
- Coat of arms

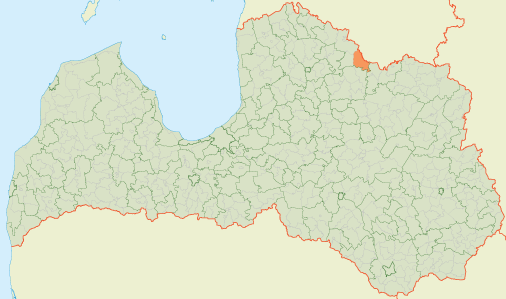
- 57°35′24″N 26°13′07″E
- Country: Latvia

Area
  - Total: 170.09 km^{2} (65.67 sq mi)
  - Land: 165.55 km^{2} (63.92 sq mi)
  - Water: 4.54 km^{2} (1.75 sq mi)

Population (1 January 2024)
  - Total: 334
  - Density: 2.0/km^{2} (5.1/sq mi)

Zvārtava Parish (Latvian: Zvārtavas pagasts) is an administrative territorial entity of Valka Municipality, Latvia.
