= Bērzgale Parish =

Parish of Latvia

- parish of Latvia
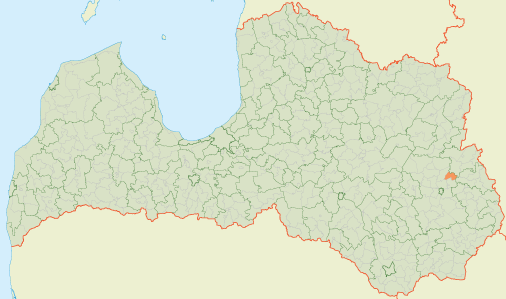
- 56°37′35″N 27°29′39″E
- Country: Latvia

Area
  - Total: 52.02 km^{2} (20.09 sq mi)
  - Land: 52.02 km^{2} (20.09 sq mi)
  - Water: 3.29 km^{2} (1.27 sq mi)

Population (1 January 2024)
  - Total: 599
  - Density: 12/km^{2} (30/sq mi)
- Website: berzgale.lv

Bērzgale Parish (Latvian: Bērzgales pagasts) is an administrative unit of Rēzekne Municipality, Latvia.
