= Griškāni Parish =

Parish of Latvia

- parish of Latvia
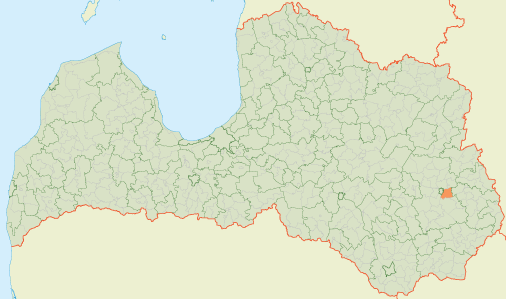
- 56°29′14″N 27°25′30″E
- Country: Latvia

Area
  - Total: 76.38 km^{2} (29.49 sq mi)
  - Land: 73.28 km^{2} (28.29 sq mi)
  - Water: 3.1 km^{2} (1.2 sq mi)

Population (1 January 2026)
  - Total: 1,719
  - Density: 23.46/km^{2} (60.76/sq mi)
- Website: www.griskani.com

Griškāni Parish (Latvian: Griškanu pagasts) is an administrative unit of Rēzekne Municipality in Latvia.
