= Mētriena Parish =

Parish of Latvia

- parish of Latvia
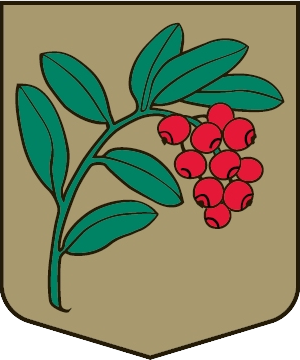
- Coat of arms

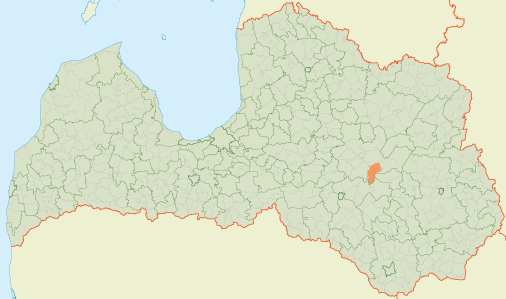
- 56°41′05″N 26°21′19″E

- Location within Latvia
- Country: Latvia

Area
  - Total: 140.28 km^{2} (54.16 sq mi)
  - Land: 136.27 km^{2} (52.61 sq mi)
  - Water: 4.01 km^{2} (1.55 sq mi)

Population (1 January 2026)
  - Total: 596
  - Density: 4.37/km^{2} (11.3/sq mi)

Mētriena parish (Latvian: Mētrienas pagasts) is an administrative unit of Madona Municipality, Latvia.
