= Lazdona Parish =

Parish of Latvia

- parish of Latvia
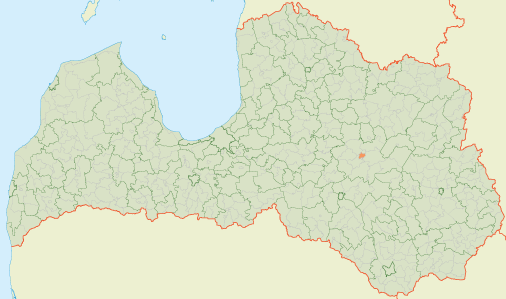
- 56°49′27″N 26°11′36″E

- Location within Latvia
- Country: Latvia

Area
  - Total: 22.27 km^{2} (8.60 sq mi)
  - Land: 20.99 km^{2} (8.10 sq mi)
  - Water: 1.28 km^{2} (0.49 sq mi)

Population (1 January 2026)
  - Total: 586
  - Density: 27.9/km^{2} (72.3/sq mi)

Lazdona parish (Latvian: Lazdonas pagasts) is an administrative unit of Madona Municipality, Latvia.

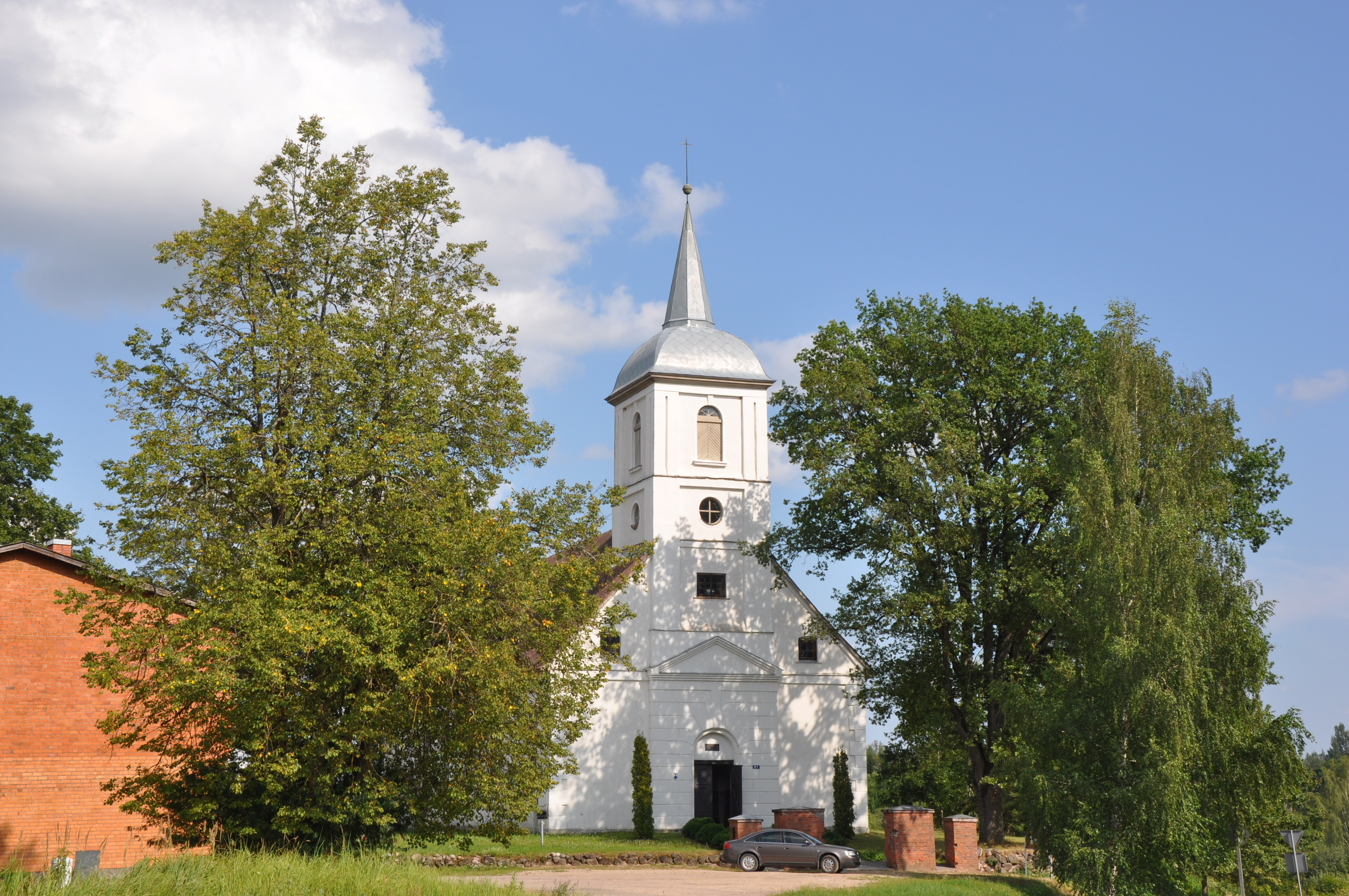
Lutheran church in Lazdona village
