= Rikava Parish =

Parish of Latvia

- parish of Latvia
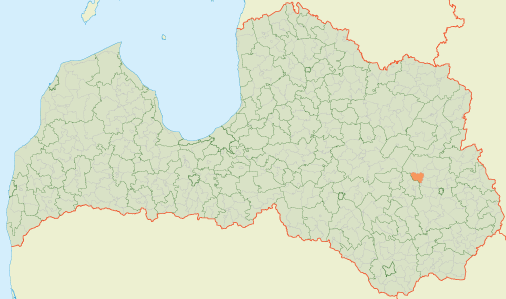
- Coordinates: 56°38′05″N 27°00′12″E
- Country: Latvia

Population (1 January 2026)
  - Total: 573
- Time zone: Eastern European Time

Rikava Parish (Latvian: Rikavas pagasts) is an administrative unit of Rēzekne Municipality in the Latgale region of Latvia.
