= Ozolmuiža Parish =

Parish of Latvia

- parish of Latvia
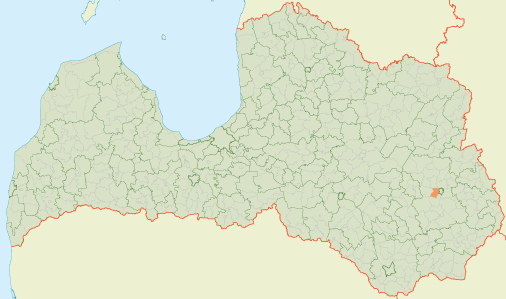
- Coordinates: 56°29′52″N 27°15′06″E
- Country: Latvia

Population (1 January 2026)
  - Total: 775
- Time zone: Eastern European Time

Ozolmuiža Parish (Latvian: Ozolmuižas pagasts) is an administrative unit of Rēzekne Municipality, Latvia.
