= Stoļerova Parish =

Parish of Latvia

- parish of Latvia
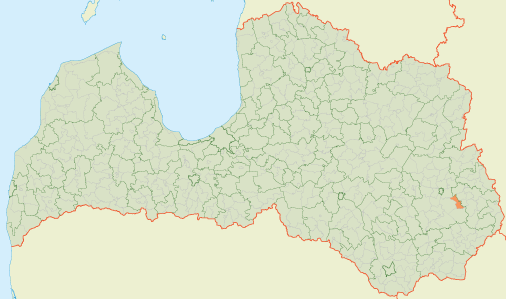
- Coordinates: 56°24′44″N 27°34′07″E
- Country: Latvia

Population (1 January 2026)
  - Total: 482
- Time zone: Eastern European Time

Stoļerova Parish (Latvian: Stoļerovas pagasts) is an administrative unit of Rēzekne Municipality, Latvia.

== Towns, villages and settlements of Stoļerova parish ==
- Stoļerova - parish administrative center
