= Degole Parish =

Parish of Latvia

- parish of Latvia
- Coat of arms

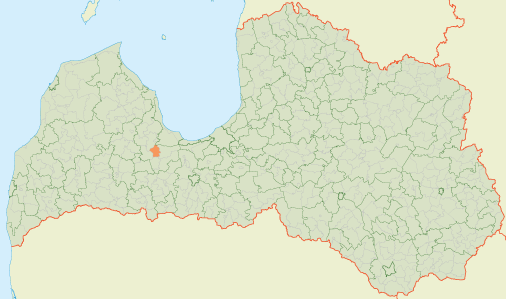
- Coordinates: 56°52′35″N 23°08′19″E
- Country: Latvia

Population (1 January 2026)
  - Total: 569

Degole Parish (Latvian: Degoles pagasts) is an administrative unit of Tukums Municipality, Latvia, in the historical region of Courland. Prior to the 2009 administrative reforms it was part of Tukums district.
