= Madliena Parish =

Parish of Latvia

- parish of Latvia
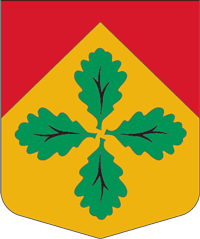
- Coat of arms

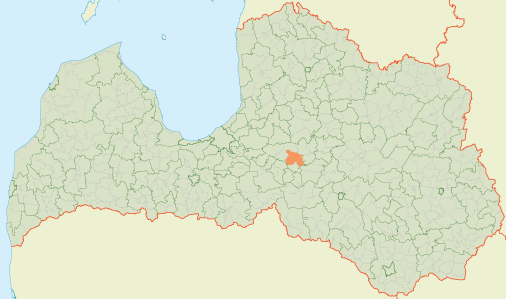
- Coordinates: 56°48′49″N 25°11′45″E
- Country: Latvia

Population (1 January 2026)
  - Total: 1,410

Madliena Parish (Latvian: Madlienas pagasts) is an administrative unit of Ogre Municipality in the Vidzeme region of Latvia. Its center is the village of Madliena.

== Towns, villages and settlements of Madliena Parish ==
- Madliena, Latvia – parish administrative center
- Plātere
- Silamuiža
- Vecķeipene
- Zādzene
