= Dricāni Parish =

Parish of Latvia

- parish of Latvia
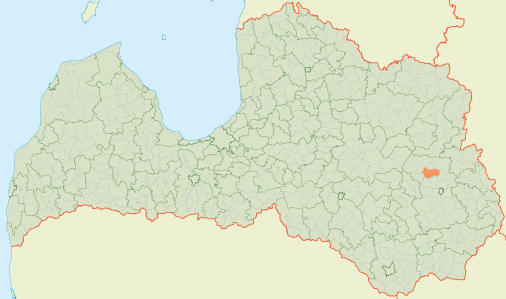
- Coordinates: 56°39′45″N 27°11′53″E
- Country: Latvia

Population (1 January 2026)
  - Total: 760
- Time zone: Eastern European Time

Dricāni parish (Latvian: Dricānu pagasts) is an administrative unit of Rēzekne Municipality, Latvia.
