= Ozolaine Parish =

Parish of Latvia

- parish of Latvia
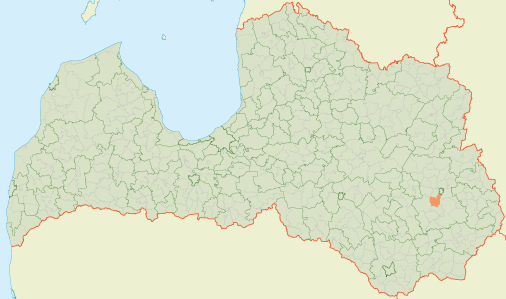
- Coordinates: 56°26′03″N 27°14′58″E
- Country: Latvia

Population (1 January 2026)
  - Total: 1,642
- Time zone: Eastern European Time
- Website: http://www.ozolaine.lv/

Ozolaine Parish (Latvian: Ozolaines pagasts) is an administrative unit of Rēzekne Municipality, Latvia. It has an area of 80.60 square kilometers and is home to 1,626 people.
