= Plāņi Parish =

Parish of Latvia

- parish of Latvia
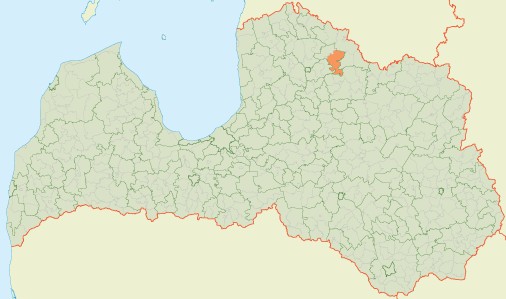
- Coordinates: 57°35′35″N 25°50′59″E
- Country: Latvia

Population (1 January 2026)
  - Total: 463

Plāņi Parish (Latvian: Plāņu pagasts) is an administrative unit of Valmiera Municipality in Vidzeme, Latvia.
