= Jērcēni Parish =

Parish of Latvia

- parish of Latvia
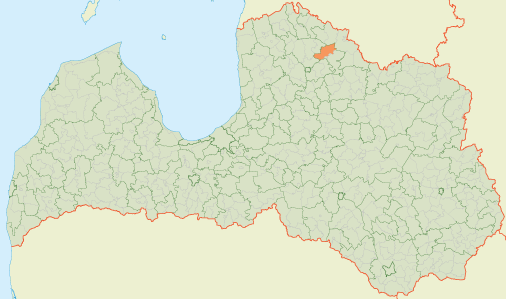
- Coordinates: 57°40′35″N 25°41′43″E
- Country: Latvia

Population (1 January 2026)
  - Total: 334

Jērcēni Parish (Latvian: Jērcēnu pagasts) is an administrative unit of Valmiera Municipality in the Vidzeme region of Latvia. In the Inter-war period, it was a part of Valka County.

== Population ==
Population changes
Year	Pop.	±%
1935	1,140	—
1967	919	−19.4%
1979	–	—
1989	–	—
2000	670	—
2011	478	−28.7%
2021	358	−25.1%
