= Ilzeskalns Parish =

Parish of Latvia

- parish of Latvia
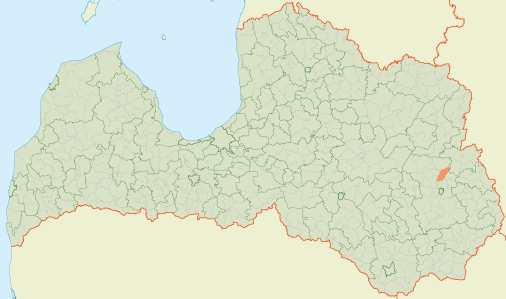
- Coordinates: 56°38′46″N 27°22′49″E
- Country: Latvia

Population (1 January 2026)
  - Total: 561
- Time zone: Eastern European Time

Ilzeskalns Parish (Latvian: Ilzeskalna pagasts) is an administrative unit of Rēzekne Municipality, Latvia.
