= Vijciems Parish =

Parish of Latvia

- parish of Latvia
- Coat of arms

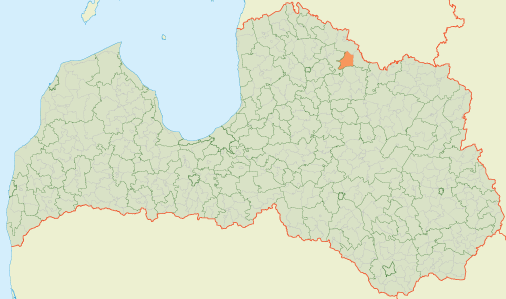
- Coordinates: 57°35′55″N 26°00′31″E
- Country: Latvia

Population (1 January 2026)
  - Total: 546

Vijciems Parish (Latvian: Vijciema pagasts) is an administrative unit of Valka Municipality, Latvia.

== Towns, villages and settlements of Vijciems Parish ==
- Vijciems - parish administrative center
- Mežmuiža
