= Platone Parish =

Parish of Latvia

- parish of Latvia
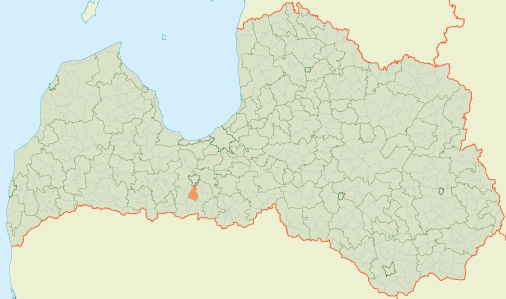
- Coordinates: 56°32′14″N 23°42′28″E
- Country: Latvia

Population (1 January 2026)
  - Total: 1,282
- Time zone: Eastern European Time

Platone Parish (Latvian: Platones pagasts) is an administrative unit of Jelgava Municipality in the Semigallia region of Latvia (Prior to the 2009 administrative reforms it was part of Jelgava district).
