= Jaunsāti Parish =

Parish of Latvia

- parish of Latvia
- Coat of arms

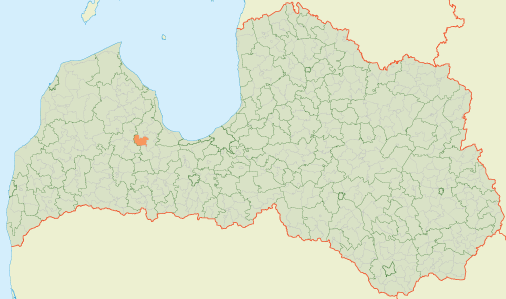
- Coordinates: 56°57′41″N 22°54′49″E
- Country: Latvia

Population (1 January 2026)
  - Total: 762

Jaunsāti Parish (Latvian: Jaunsātu pagasts) is an administrative unit of Tukums Municipality, in the Courland region of Latvia.
