= Krustpils Parish =

Parish of Latvia

- parish of Latvia
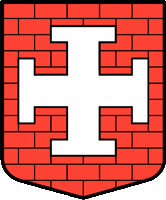
- Coat of arms

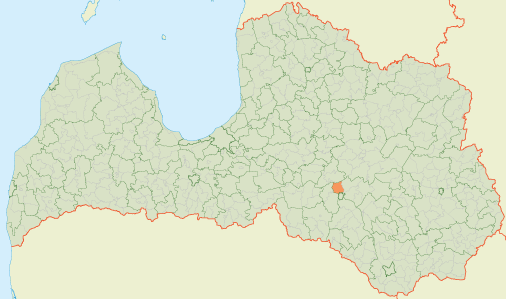
- Coordinates: 56°34′07″N 25°49′40″E
- Country: Latvia

Population (1 January 2026)
  - Total: 801

Krustpils Parish (Latvian: Krustpils pagasts) is an administrative unit of Jēkabpils Municipality in the Latgale region of Latvia. Prior to the 2009 administrative reforms, it was part of the former Jēkabpils district. Parish administration is in Spuņģēni.
