= Kantinieki Parish =

Parish of Latvia

- parish of Latvia
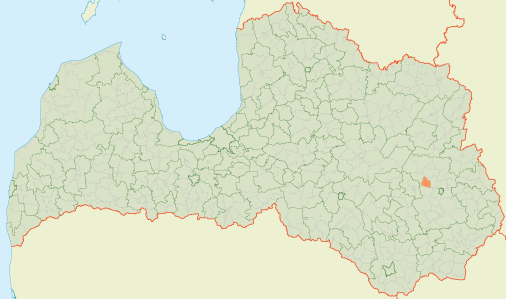
- Coordinates: 56°35′02″N 27°07′29″E
- Country: Latvia

Population (1 January 2026)
  - Total: 384
- Time zone: Eastern European Time

Kantinieki Parish (Latvian: Kantinieku pagasts) is an administrative unit of Rēzekne Municipality, Latvia.
