= Kārķi Parish =

Parish of Latvia

- parish of Latvia
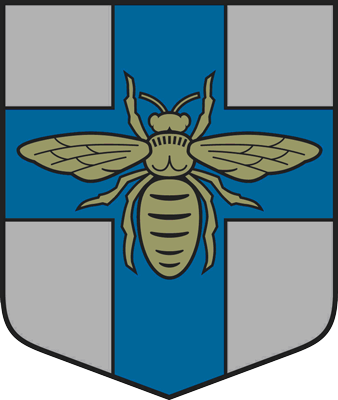
- Coat of arms

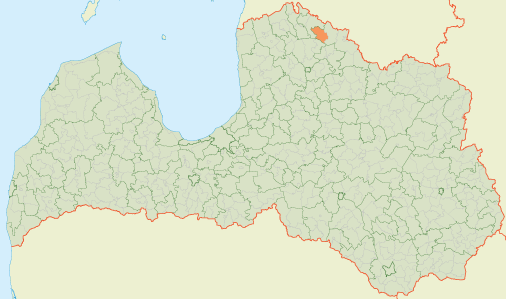
- Coordinates: 57°49′14″N 25°37′14″E
- Country: Latvia

Population (1 January 2026)
  - Total: 512

Kārķi parish (Latvian: Kārķu pagasts) is an administrative unit of Valka Municipality, Latvia. Prior to the 2009 administrative reforms it was part of Valka district.
