= Viļāni Parish =

Parish of Latvia

- parish of Latvia
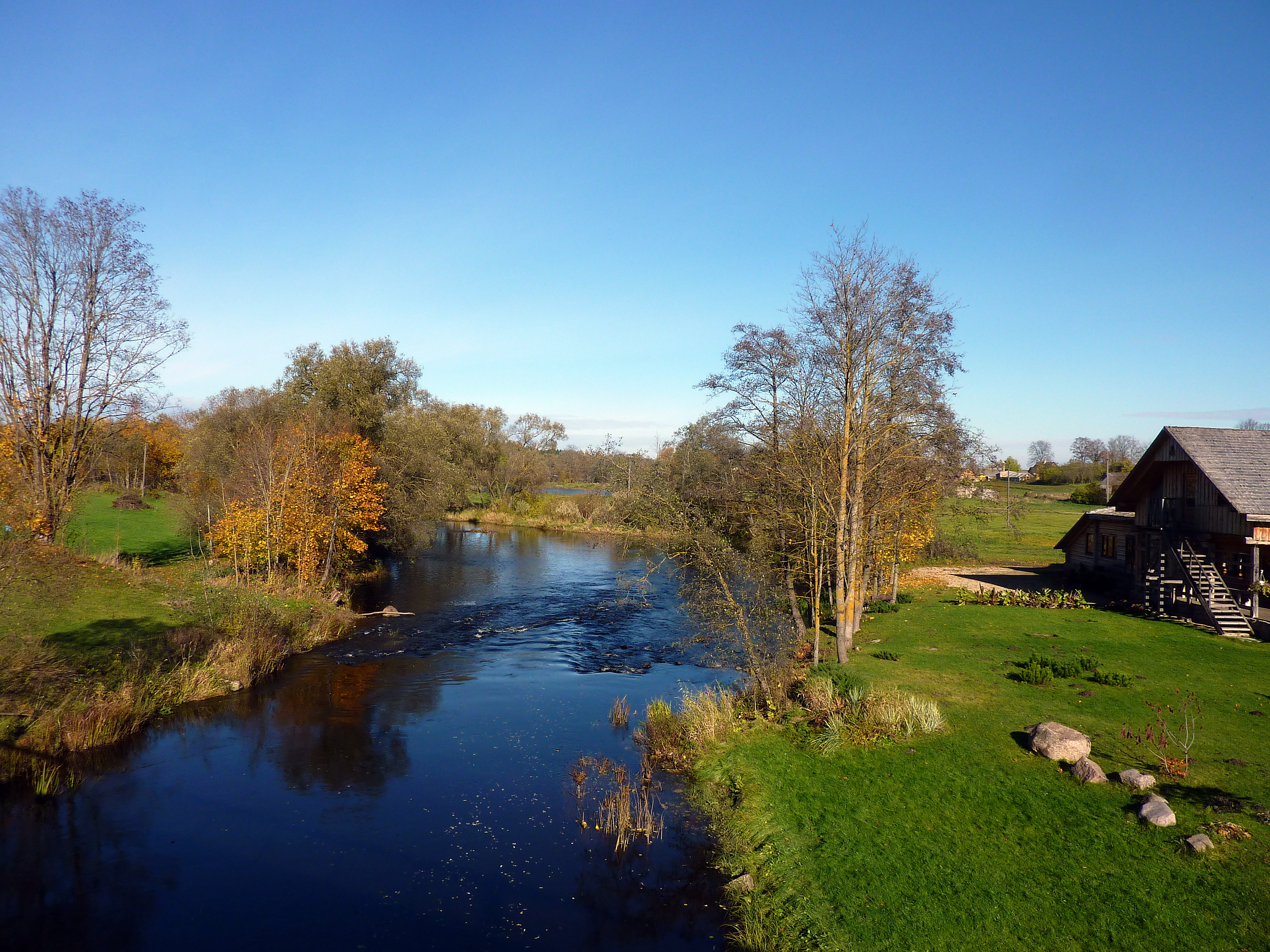

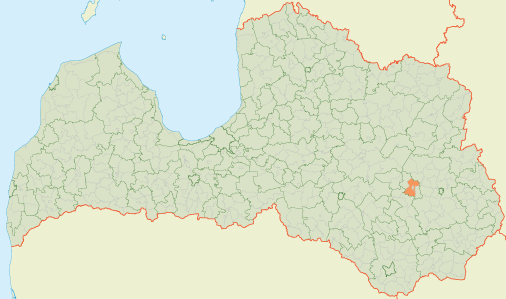
- 56°32′55″N 26°54′35″E
- Country: Latvia

Area
  - Total: 120.45 km^{2} (46.51 sq mi)
  - Land: 117.88 km^{2} (45.51 sq mi)
  - Water: 2.57 km^{2} (0.99 sq mi)

Population (1 January 2025)
  - Total: 1,209
  - Density: 10.26/km^{2} (26.56/sq mi)

Viļāni Parish (Latvian: Viļānu pagasts) is an administrative unit of Rēzekne Municipality in the Latgale region of Latvia.
