= Stružāni Parish =

Parish of Latvia

- parish of Latvia
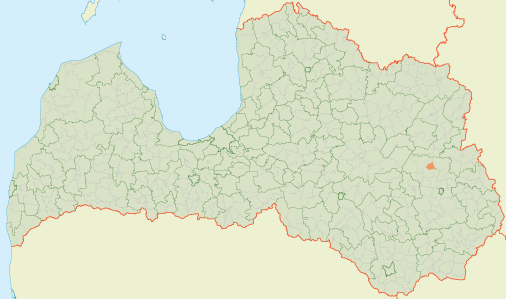
- Coordinates: 56°42′51″N 27°12′21″E
- Country: Latvia

Population (1 January 2026)
  - Total: 643
- Time zone: Eastern European Time
- Website: https://struzani.weebly.com/

Stružāni Parish (Latvian: Stružānu pagasts) is an administrative unit of Rēzekne Municipality, Latvia.

== Towns, villages and settlements of Stružāni parish ==
- Strūžāni - parish administrative center
