= Dekšāres Parish =

Parish of Latvia

- parish of Latvia
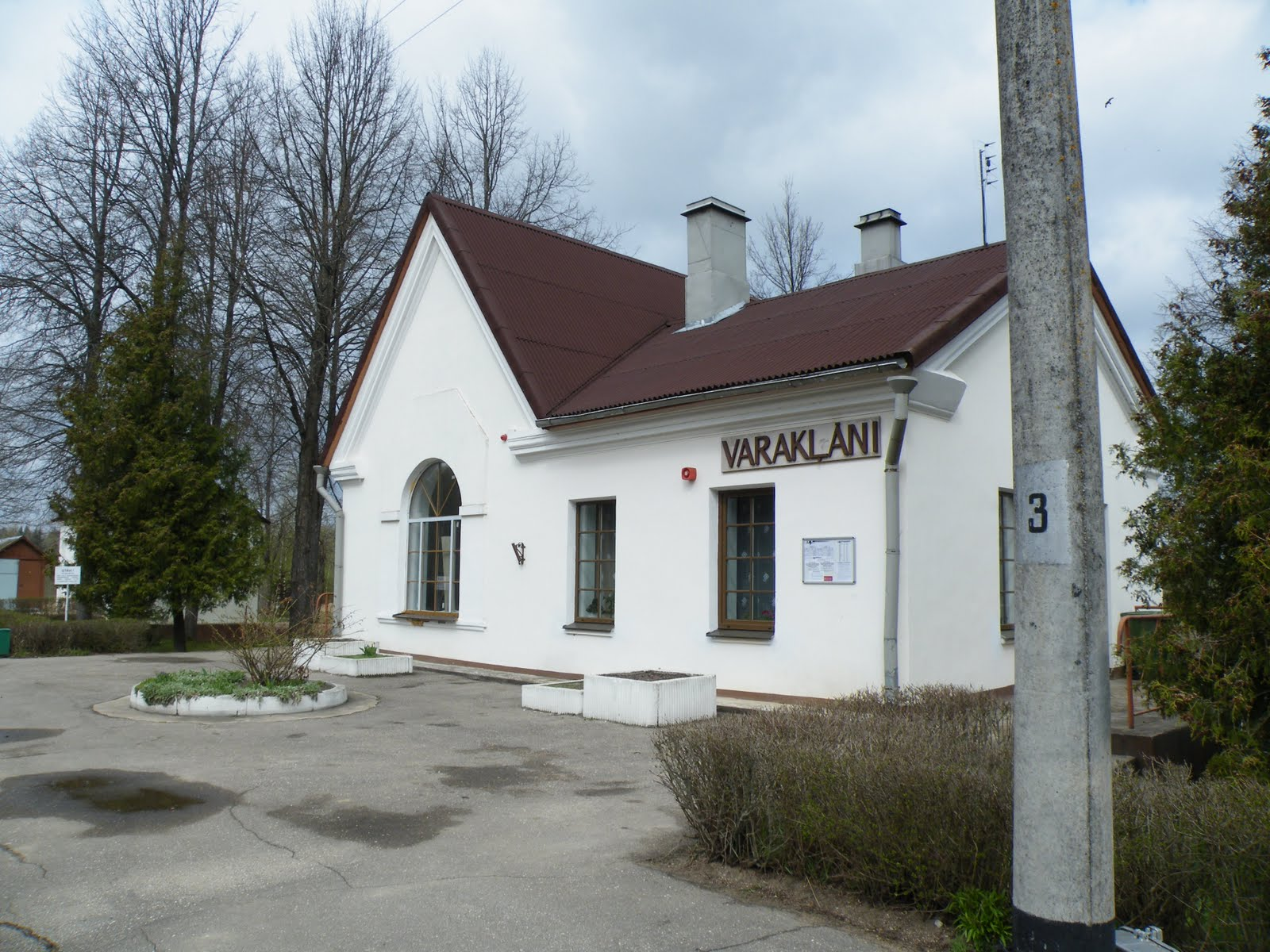

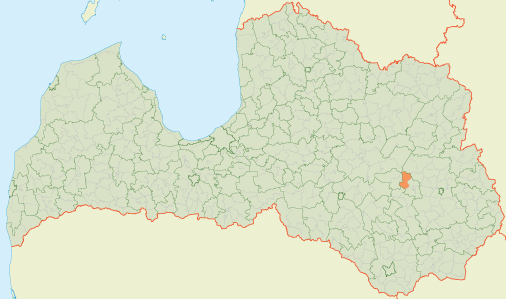
- 56°36′46″N 26°49′22″E
- Country: Latvia

Area
  - Total: 104.68 km^{2} (40.42 sq mi)
  - Land: 101.75 km^{2} (39.29 sq mi)
  - Water: 2.93 km^{2} (1.13 sq mi)

Population (1 January 2026)
  - Total: 537
  - Density: 5.28/km^{2} (13.7/sq mi)

Dekšāres Parish (Latvian: Dekšāru pagasts) is an administrative territorial entity of Rēzekne Municipality in the Latgale region of Latvia.
