= Meņģele Parish =

Parish of Latvia

- parish of Latvia
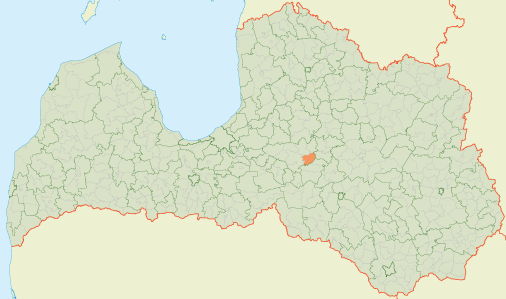
- Coordinates: 56°48′45″N 25°24′35″E
- Country: Latvia

Population (1 January 2026)
  - Total: 424

Meņģele Parish (Latvian: Meņģeles pagasts) is an administrative unit of Ogre Municipality in the Vidzeme region of Latvia. Its center is Meņģele.

== Villages and settlements of Meņģele Parish ==
- Meņģele – parish administrative center
- Meņģeles muiža
- Gnēžas
