= Puša Parish =

Parish of Latvia

- parish of Latvia
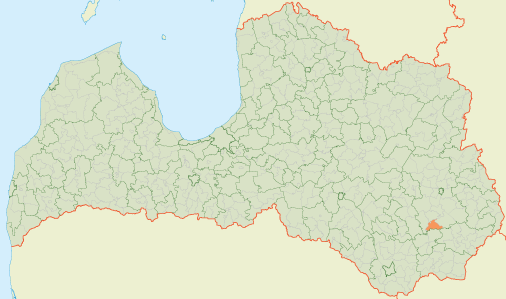
- Coordinates: 56°13′57″N 27°12′17″E
- Country: Latvia

Population (1 January 2026)
  - Total: 314
- Time zone: Eastern European Time

Puša Parish (Latvian: Pušas pagasts) is an administrative unit of Rēzekne Municipality, Latvia.
