= Sokolki Parish =

Parish of Latvia

- parish of Latvia
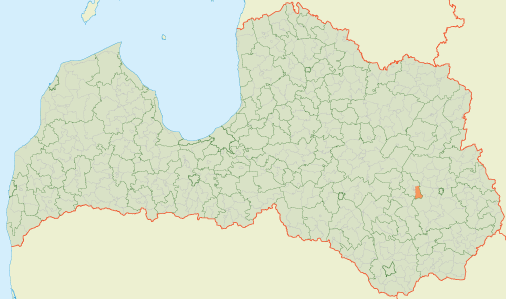
- 56°30′15″N 26°59′59″E
- Country: Latvia

Area
  - Total: 56.76 km^{2} (21.92 sq mi)
  - Land: 55.82 km^{2} (21.55 sq mi)
  - Water: 0.94 km^{2} (0.36 sq mi)

Population (1 January 2024)
  - Total: 595
  - Density: 10/km^{2} (27/sq mi)

Sokolki Parish (Latvian: Sokolku pagasts) is an administrative unit of Rēzekne Municipality in the Latgale region of Latvia. The administrative center is Strupļi.

== Towns, villages and settlements of Sokolki Parish ==
- Skudnovka
- Strupļi
- Ustroņi
