= Blome Parish =

Parish of Latvia

- parish of Latvia
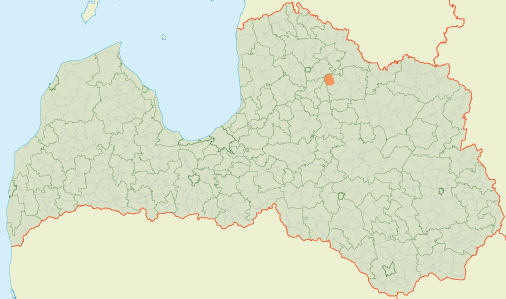
- Coordinates: 57°26′52″N 25°44′25″E
- Country: Latvia

Population (1 January 2026)
  - Total: 768

Blome Parish (Latvian: Blomes pagasts) is an administrative unit of Smiltene Municipality, Latvia.
