= Krape Parish =

Parish of Latvia

- parish of Latvia
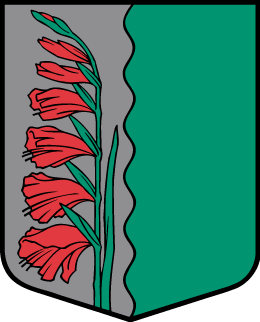
- Coat of arms

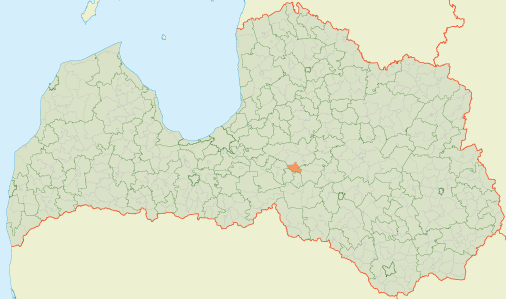
- Coordinates: 56°44′15″N 25°11′49″E
- Country: Latvia

Population (1 January 2026)
  - Total: 544
- Website: https://www.krape.lv

Krape Parish (Latvian: Krapes pagasts) is an administrative unit of Ogre Municipality in the Vidzeme region of Latvia. Its center is Krape.

== Towns, villages and settlements of Krape parish ==
- Krape
- Lobe
- Krapes muiža

== Population ==
84% of the people are Latvians and 11% of the people are Russians 48,8% of the population - Men, 51,2% - Women
