= Tume Parish =

Parish of Latvia

- parish of Latvia
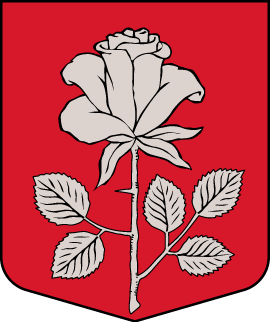
- Coat of arms

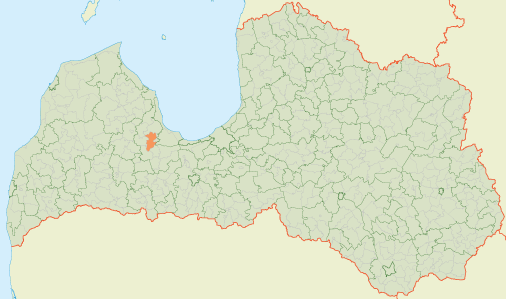
- Coordinates: 56°57′35″N 23°04′02″E
- Country: Latvia

Population (1 January 2026)
  - Total: 1,665

Tume Parish (Latvian: Tumes pagasts) is an administrative unit of Tukums Municipality in the Courland region of Latvia. The administrative center is Tume.

== Towns, villages and settlements of Tume parish ==
- Ezerkauķi
- Gaiļi
- Krīvi
- Tume

== See also ==
- Jaunmokas Manor
