= Viesturi Parish =

Parish of Latvia

- parish of Latvia
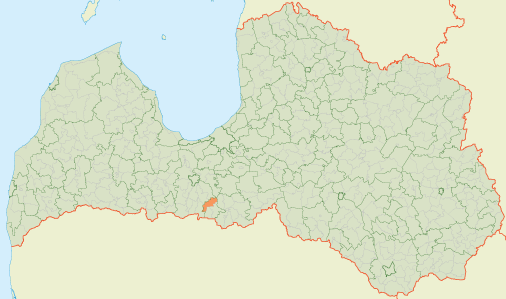
- Coordinates: 56°27′11″N 23°56′25″E
- Country: Latvia

Population (1 January 2026)
  - Total: 781

Viesturi Parish (Latvian: Viesturu pagasts) is an administrative unit of Bauska Municipality in the Semigallia region of Latvia.

== Towns, villages and settlements of Viesturi Parish ==
- Bērstele - parish administrative center
