= Malta Parish =

Parish of Latvia

- parish of Latvia
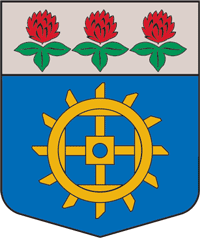
- Coat of arms

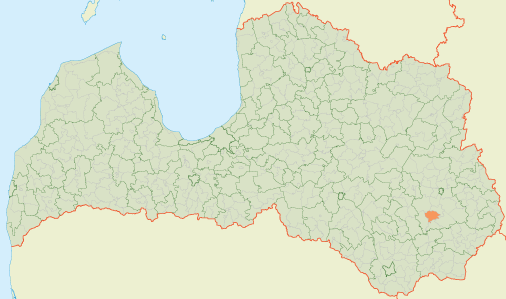
- Coordinates: 56°18′54″N 27°11′20″E
- Country: Latvia

Population (1 January 2026)
  - Total: 2,345
- Time zone: Eastern European Time
- Website: https://www.malta.lv/

Malta Parish (Latvian: Maltas pagasts) is an administrative unit of Rēzekne Municipality, Latvia.

== Towns, villages and settlements of Malta parish ==
- Malta (Malta parish) – parish administrative center.
