= Laubere Parish =

Parish of Latvia

- parish of Latvia
- Coat of arms

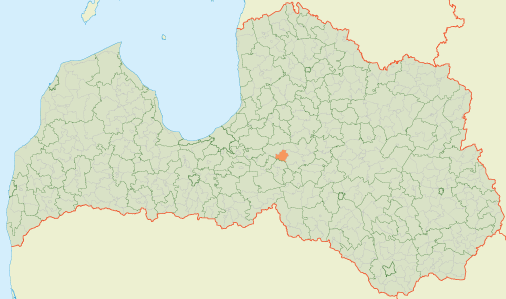
- Coordinates: 56°50′15″N 25°00′54″E
- Country: Latvia

Population (1 January 2026)
  - Total: 558

Laubere Parish (Latvian: Lauberes pagasts) is an administrative unit of Ogre Municipality in the Vidzeme region of Latvia. Its center is Laubere.

== Towns, villages and settlements of Laubere Parish ==
- Laubere
- Krodzinieki
- Cēsītes
