= Lendži Parish =

Parish of Latvia

- parish of Latvia
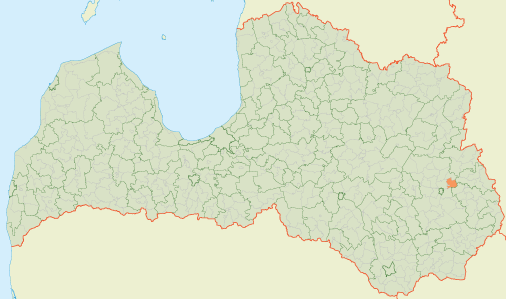
- Coordinates: 56°34′11″N 27°29′51″E
- Country: Latvia

Population (1 January 2026)
  - Total: 589
- Time zone: Eastern European Time
- Website: https://www.lendzi.lv/

Lendži Parish (Latvian: Lendžu pagasts) is an administrative unit of Rēzekne Municipality, Latvia.
