= Gaigalava Parish =

Latvian parish

- parish of Latvia
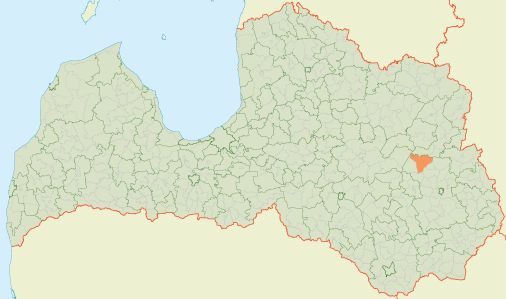
- Coordinates: 56°45′24″N 27°04′14″E
- Country: Latvia

Population (1 January 2026)
  - Total: 717
- Time zone: Eastern European Time

Gaigalava Parish (Latvian: Gaigalavas pagasts) is an administrative unit of Rēzekne Municipality, Latvia. The center of the parish is Gaigalava (Bikava).
