= Silmala Parish =

Parish of Latvia

- parish of Latvia
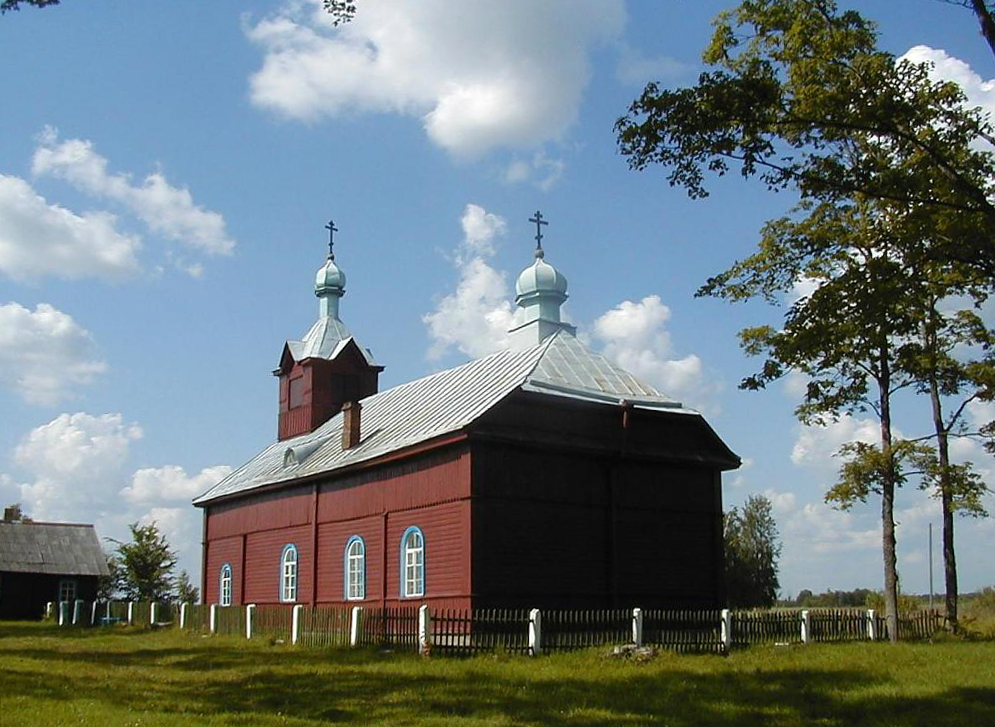

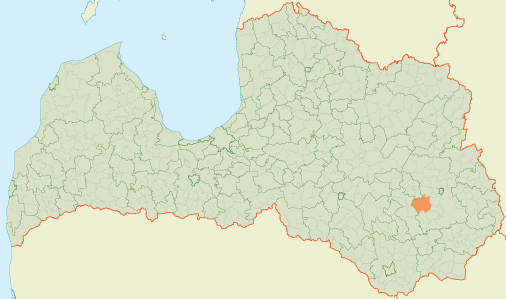
- Coordinates: 56°24′40″N 27°03′13″E
- Country: Latvia

Population (1 January 2026)
  - Total: 2,099
- Time zone: Eastern European Time
- Website: http://www.silmala.lv/

Silmala Parish (Latvian: Silmalas pagasts) is an administrative unit of Rēzekne Municipality, Latvia.

== Towns, villages and settlements of Silmala parish ==
- Gornica, Latvia - parish administrative center
