= Čornaja Parish =

Parish of Latvia

- parish of Latvia
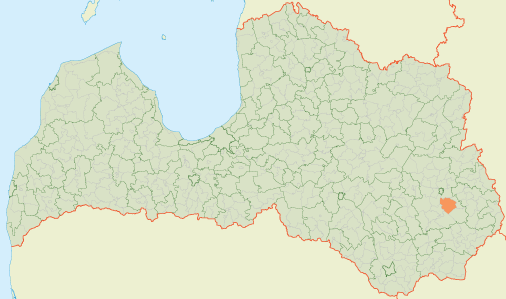
- Coordinates: 56°23′46″N 27°25′44″E
- Country: Latvia

Population (1 January 2026)
  - Total: 968
- Time zone: Eastern European Time

Čornaja Parish (Latvian: Čornajas pagasts, Latgalian: Dyužgola pogosts) is an administrative unit of Rēzekne Municipality, Latvia.
