= Viļāni =

Town in Rēzekne Municipality, Latvia

- Town
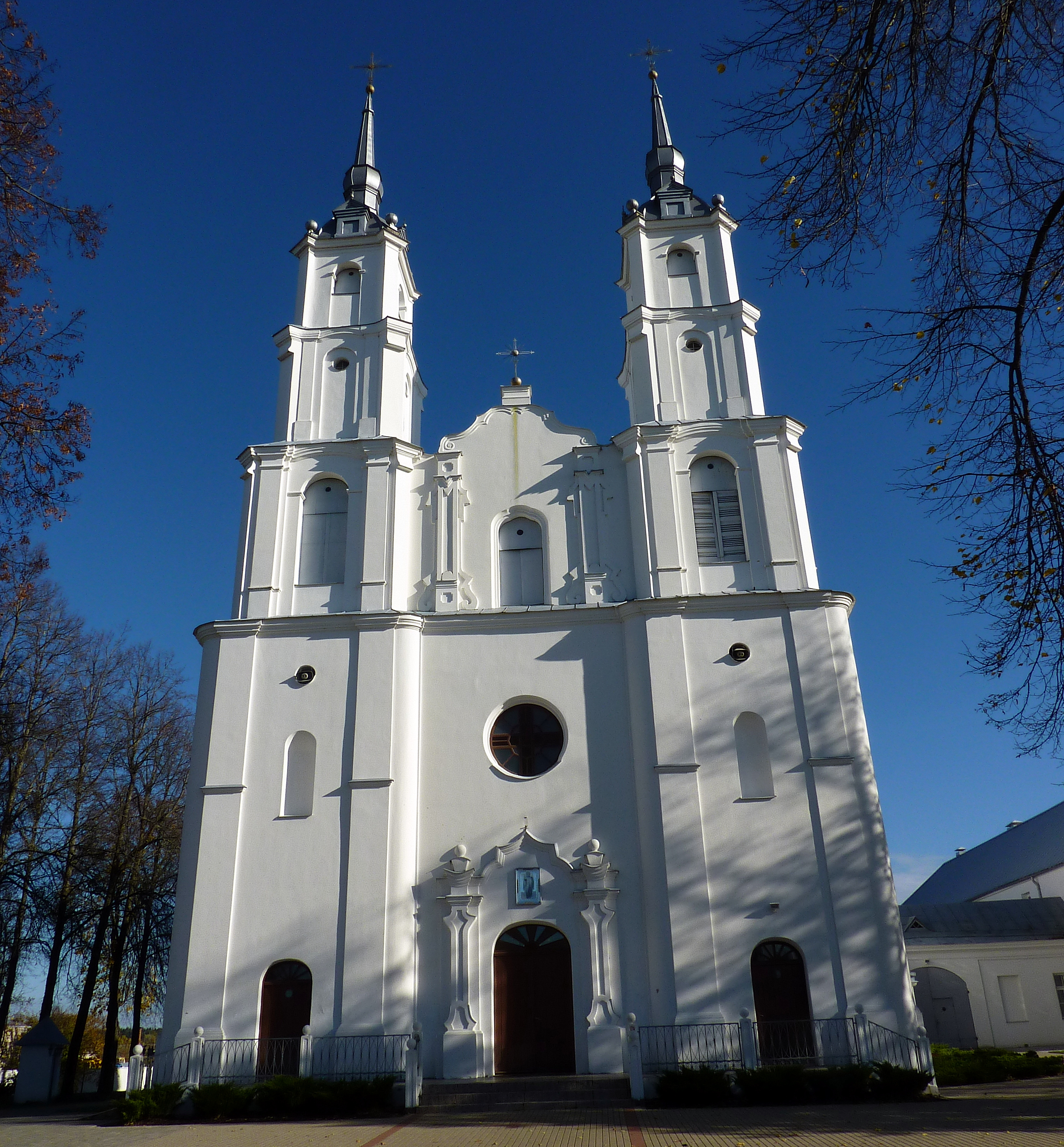
- The Roman Catholic Church of Archangel Michael

- Flag Coat of arms

- Location in Latvia
- Coordinates: 56°33′6.9″N 26°55′37.8″E
- Country: Latvia
- Municipality: Rēzekne Municipality
- Town rights: 1928

Area
  - Total: 4.93 km^{2} (1.90 sq mi)
  - Land: 4.75 km^{2} (1.83 sq mi)
  - Water: 0.18 km^{2} (0.069 sq mi)

Population (2026)
  - Total: 2,678
  - Density: 564/km^{2} (1,460/sq mi)
- Time zone: UTC+2 (EET)
  - Summer (DST): UTC+3 (EEST)
- Postal code: LV-4650
- Calling code: +371 646
- Website: http://www.vilani.lv

Viļāni (German: Welonen, Polish: Wielony) is a town in Rēzekne Municipality in the Latgale region of Latvia. The railway line Riga-Moscow, and the motor highway Riga-Moscow, and the road Preiļi-Balvi cross Viļāni. The Malta river flows through the town. The population in 2020 was 2,813.

== History ==
The town was mentioned for the first time in 1495 with the name Wielona. In 1507, the largest estate of Latgale region became the property of de Overlak. In 1752, M. Riks, who was the ruler of Inflanty, bought the Viļāni estate. He was the first landlord who very positively influenced the development of the region. The monastery and the St. Michael church in the baroque style were built under his leadership. The monks of the Bernardine Order were housed in the monastery. Because of the revolt of the Poles in 1830, the monastery had a library with 463 church books in Latin and Polish. The location on the trade road Riga-Rēzekne favoured the development of Viļāni. In 1839, the Viļāni estate became the property of Vincent Janovskis. At the beginning of the 1850s, Janovskis built a three-storied flax mill. There were only three such flax mills in Russian Empire at that time. In Viļāni there was the largest leather production factory in Russia. It supplied the tsarist army with belts, bags, footwear, saddles and leather accessories. In the estate, there were also several small factories, for example two limekilns, a brick factory, mills, breweries. In 1852, Viļāni was called a hamlet. There were 12 houses, the two-storied White tavern (once a horses' post station), and several shops and bakeries. In 1862, Viļāni received the official right of a hamlet. In 1924, monks and priests B. Skrinda and B. Valpirts of the Marijani Congregation arrived to Viļāni. They revived the abbey, restored the monastery, adding the second floor to the building. In 1925, there were 4 schools in Viļāni. When Viļāni got the town right on February 25, 1928, it had a territory of 1.63 square kilometres and 65 trade enterprises. In the initial stage of Operation Barbarossa, on 2 July 1941, Viļāni was captured by troops of the German Army Group North. On 25 July 1941, the town was placed under the administration of the newly created Reichskommissariat Ostland. About a half of inhabitants of Viļāni was killed in World War II by the Nazis. The town was also destroyed. Viļāni was recaptured on 28 July 1944 by troops of the Soviet 2nd Baltic Front.

== Population ==
By the data of Centrālās statistikas pārvalde in the beginning of 2019 there was 2850 citizens in the city.

== Structures ==
The Viļāni Catholic church, the monastery building, both built in the 18th century, and the manor house of the Viļāni estate with the park are the remarkable architectural monuments of the town. The complex of the monastery buildings with the inner yard, an example of monasteries from the Bernardian Order, belongs to the list of unusual architectural monuments of Latvia.

The Viļāni railway station is also an architecture monument. The interior of this building in neo-eclectic traditions is well preserved.

The Lakstīgalu sala ('island of nightingales') with an open-air stage, located not far from the Viļāni estate, is a favourite recreation place of the inhabitants of Viļāni. The Viļāni museum tells about the history of Viļāni from the ancient times to nowadays. Approximately 100 animals, which are living in the forests of Latgale region, are exhibited in the Viļāni forest museum.

The memorial plaque for the victims of totalitarian regime was unveiled in 1995, the memorial plaque of the liberators of Viļāni on January 11, 1920, and the memorial cross of the national fighters against the Soviet regime in 1999.

== Economy ==
There are 58 enterprises, including 8 branch offices, now in Viļāni. The woodworking enterprise, the charcoal producing enterprise and the printing house “Katoļu dzeive” are the largest of those. The local television was established in 1992. The Viļāni hydroelectric power station, built in 1950 and renewed in 1994, is the first renewed private hydroelectric power station in Latvia.

== See also ==
- List of cities in Latvia
