= Latgalians (modern) =

Latgalīši, latgali
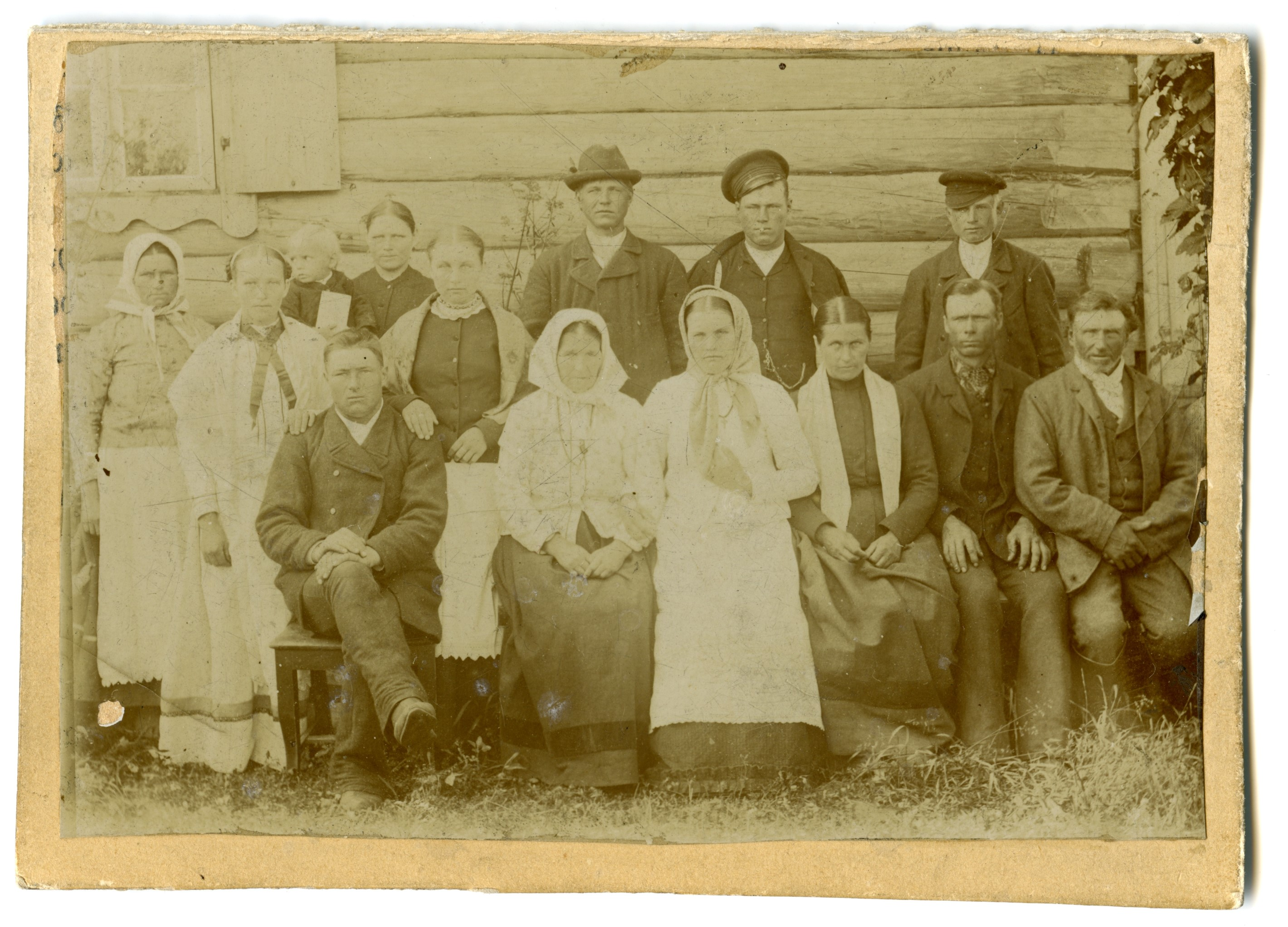
- A 1895 group photo of people from Daugavpils County

Total population
- c. 150,000 (est.)

Regions with significant populations
- Latvia: c. 150,000 (est.) Russia: 1,622; Europe: c. 50 (est.); United States: c. 50 (est.) Australia: c. 50 (est.)

Languages
- Latgalian, Latvian

Religion
- Latin Catholicism

The Latgalians (Latgalian: latgalīši, Latvian: latgalieši) are an ethnographic group living in Latgale region in Latvia, who speak Latgalian and Standard Latvian. Their distinct culture sets them apart from other Latvians.

== Name ==
In the Latgalian language, the terms latgalīši and latgaļi have been traditionally used as synonyms describing both ancient and contemporary Latgalians as a part of the same continuum. The term latgalīši (in both meanings) prevailed in Latgalian literature and mass media during the first decades of the 20th century, whereas the term latgali has been consistently used (also in both meanings) in Latgalian literature and media published during the 1920s and 1930s in Latvia and from 1940 to 1988 in exile. Since the cultural revival of Latgalians in 1988, there is a tendency in Latgalian literature and media to follow Latvians in their use of both names.

== Early history ==
Modern Latgalians developed as a result of Latgale having developed separately from other parts of contemporary Latvia after it was divided between Sweden and Poland after 1621 Truce of Altmark, leaving the most eastern part of Latvia under Polish control as Inflanty Voivodeship. This resulted in the Roman Catholic church becoming the main religious denomination in Latgale (while the rest of Latvia is traditionally Lutheran). The local dialects of Latvian language underwent a sound change probably due to Slavic influence, resulting in another feature distinguishing Latgalians from rest of Latvians. After the first Partition of Poland in 1772, Inflanty was incorporated in the Russian Empire. In 1865, as part of Russia's anti-Polish policies, a period of Russification was begun, during which the Latgalian language (written in Latin script) was forbidden. This ban was lifted in 1904, and a period of Latgalian reawakening began.

There are small Latgalian communities in Siberia, Russia, as a result of the emigration of Latgalians at the turn of the 19th and 20th centuries. At these times the estimated number of Latgalia emigrants was about 50,000 people (modern estimate) or about 10% of the population of Latgale. According to the 2010 Russian census, 1,089 persons identified themselves as Latgalians in Russia.

== First World War to Soviet era ==
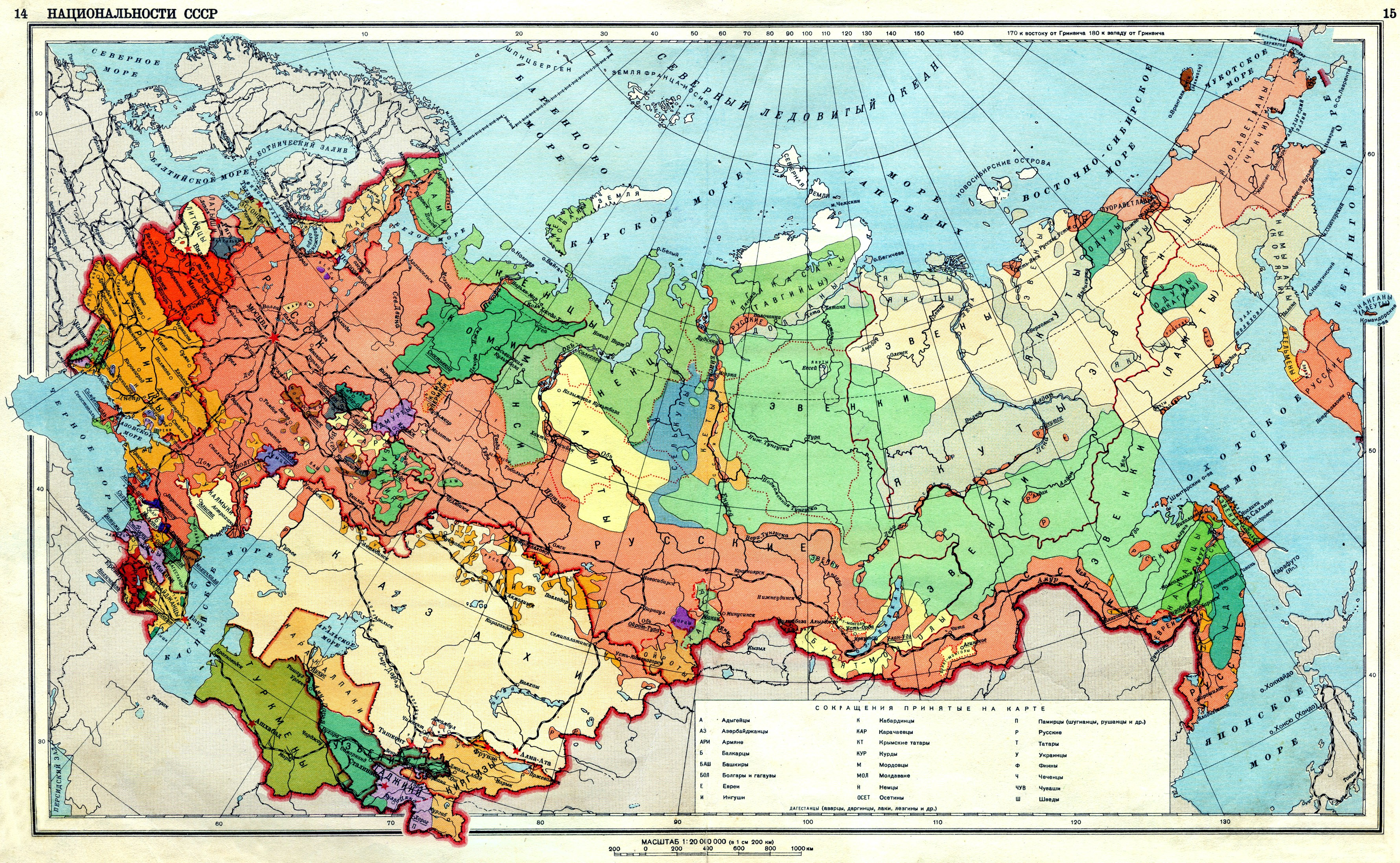
Ethnic map of the USSR featuring Latgalians marked in a deep blue color

Coat of arms of Latgale (since 1930)

During the first independence of Latvia (1918–1940), Latgale was the only region of Latvia with strong regional political parties. Although Latvian governments mainly promoted a united Latvian culture, fostering assimilation of Latgalians, especially after the coup by Kārlis Ulmanis in 1934, the Latgalian language was also used. Books were published in Latgalian, it was taught in some schools, and people could choose to use Latgalian when communicating with the government. They were classified as a Narodnosti in the First All Union Census of the Soviet Union in 1926. In the Nazi German Generalplan Ost, as far as can be told from the surviving documentation, the Latgalians were scheduled for deportation, while only half of the Latvian population was to be treated so. The reasons for this difference are unclear, but possibly based on racist linguistic arguments, considering that the Nazis planned to physically remove 85% of the Lithuanians (whose language – and by erroneous inference ethnicity – has similarities to Latgalian).

The Soviet period severely damaged Latgalian culture. Although publishing in Latgalian was generally banned, some political periodicals, like Ludzas Taisneiba (also Ludzys Taisneiba, "Truth of Ludza") were published from the end of the 1940s to the 1960s in Latgalian. Russian and Latvian were the only recognized languages.

== Modern times ==
Official flag of Latgale (since 2023)

Unofficial Latgalian flag (since 2010). Defaced with a version of the historical coat of arms of Latgale.

Latgalians continued to publish books and periodicals abroad among the Latvian diaspora. Publishing in Latgalian in Latvia resumed during the Third National Awakening in the late 1980s and is still continued. Examples of the use of Latgalian today include the internet culture magazine Lakuga.lv, versions of local newspapers, radio/TV programming and digital content by the Public Broadcasting of Latvia). The Latgalian language is mostly frequently used at home in rural areas and Latvian is overwhelmingly used in official use and in urban areas.

Some government protection for the Latgalian language is provided by the Official Language Law of 2000 which states that "the State shall ensure the maintenance, protection and development of the Latgalian written language as a historic variant of the Latvian language."

Some Latgalians consider themselves to be an ethnic group separate from Latvians. The majority and historical opinion is, however, that present-day Latgalians are a subgroup of the Latvians who are united by a dialect, which has many regional varieties. The number of people who would identify themselves as separate from Latvians is unknown because the Latvian government does not identify Latgalians as a separate group in census data.

The 2011 Census of Latvia established that 8.8% of Latvia's inhabitants or 164,500 people speak Latgalian daily. 97,600 of them live in Latgale, 29,400 in Riga, and 14,400 in Riga region.

According to the 2010 Russian census, 1,089 persons identified themselves as Latgalians in Russia.
