= Sakstagals Parish =

Parish of Latvia

- parish of Latvia
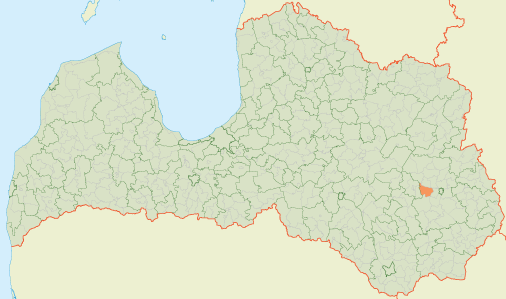
- Coordinates: 56°31′12″N 27°06′48″E
- Country: Latvia

Population (1 January 2026)
  - Total: 1,105
- Time zone: Eastern European Time

Sakstagals Parish (Latvian: Sakstagala pagasts) is an administrative unit of Rēzekne Municipality, Latvia.

== Towns, villages and settlements of Sakstagals parish ==
- Sakstagals -parish administrative center
