= Kaunata Parish =

Parish of Latvia

- parish of Latvia
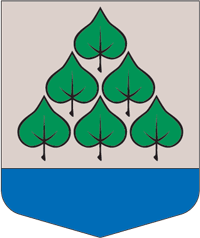
- Coat of arms

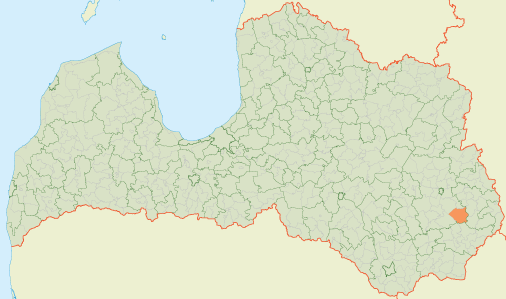
- Coordinates: 56°18′28″N 27°35′28″E
- Country: Latvia

Population (1 January 2026)
  - Total: 890
- Time zone: Eastern European Time
- Website: http://www.kaunata.lv/

Kaunata Parish (Latvian: Kaunatas pagasts) is an administrative unit of Rēzekne Municipality, Latvia.
