= Mākoņkalns Parish =

Parish of Latvia

- parish of Latvia
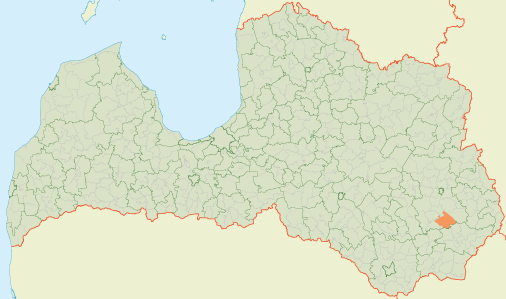
- Coordinates: 56°16′03″N 27°23′04″E
- Country: Latvia

Population (1 January 2026)
  - Total: 421
- Time zone: Eastern European Time
- Website: http://makonkalns.lv/

Mākoņkalns Parish (Latvian: Mākoņkalna pagasts) is an administrative unit of Rēzekne Municipality, Latvia.

== Towns, villages and settlements of Mākoņkalns parish ==
- Lipuški – parish administrative center

== See also ==
- Mākoņkalns Hillfort
