= Vidzeme =

Historical region in Latvia

Vidzeme Vidzeme
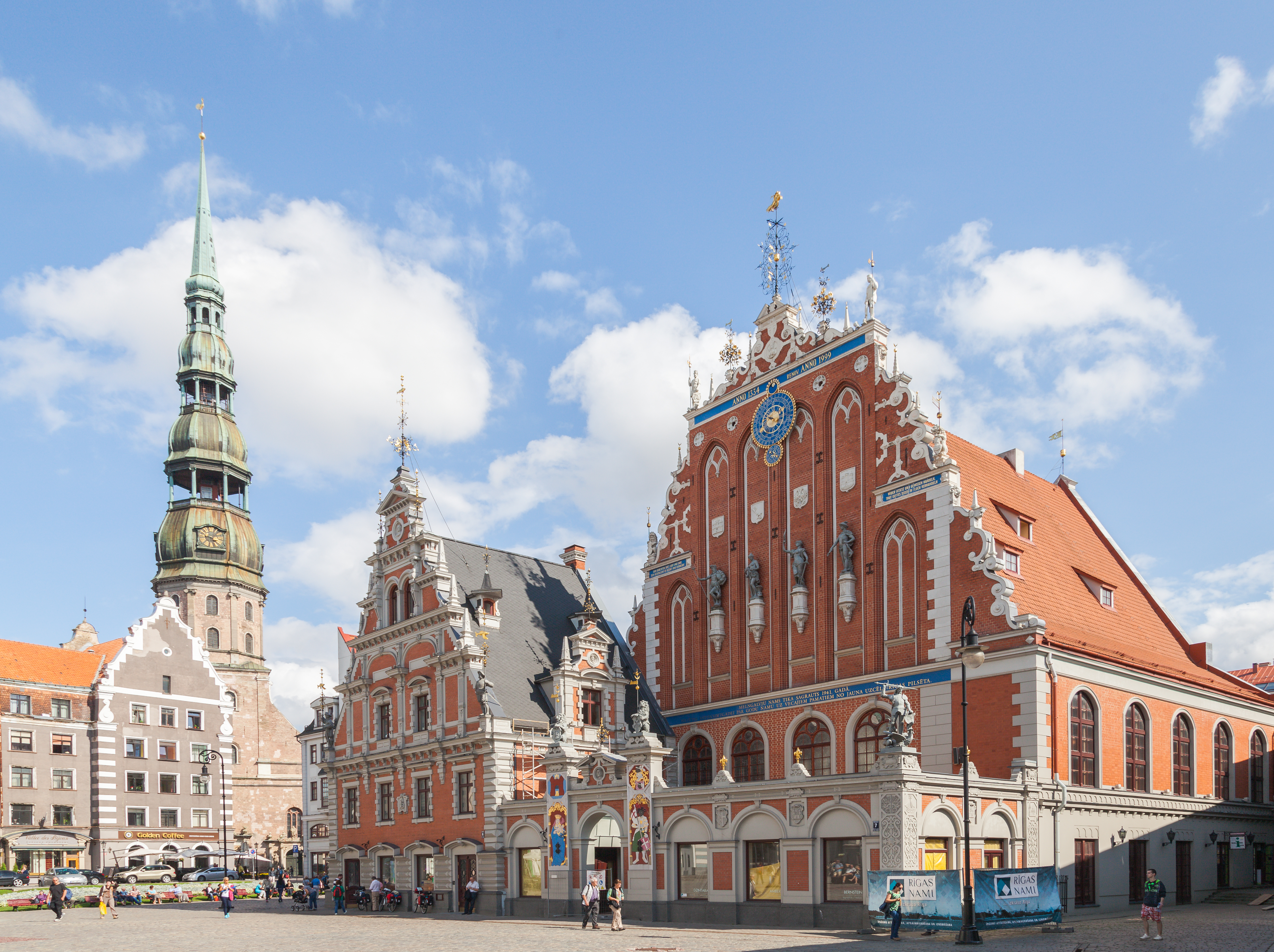
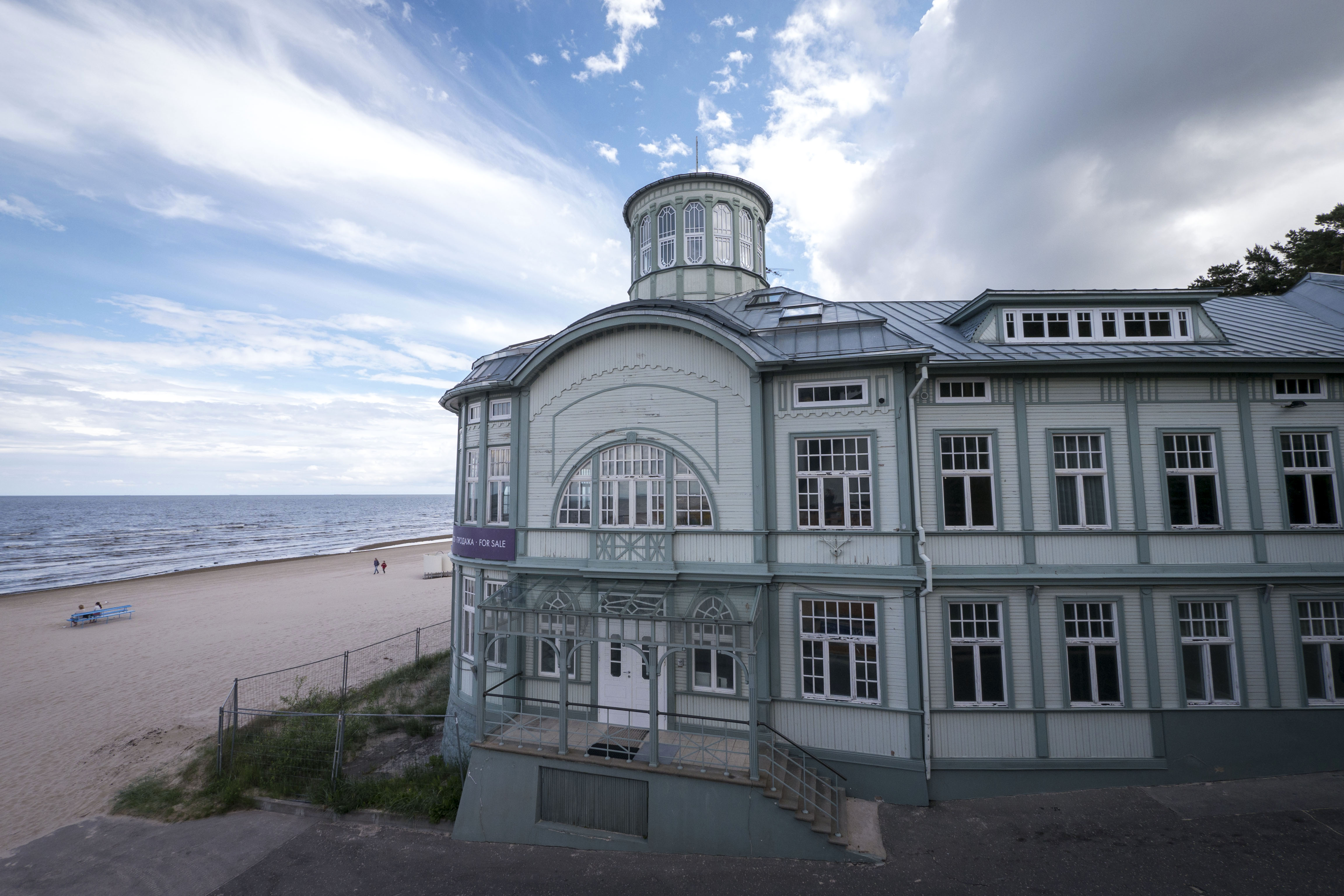
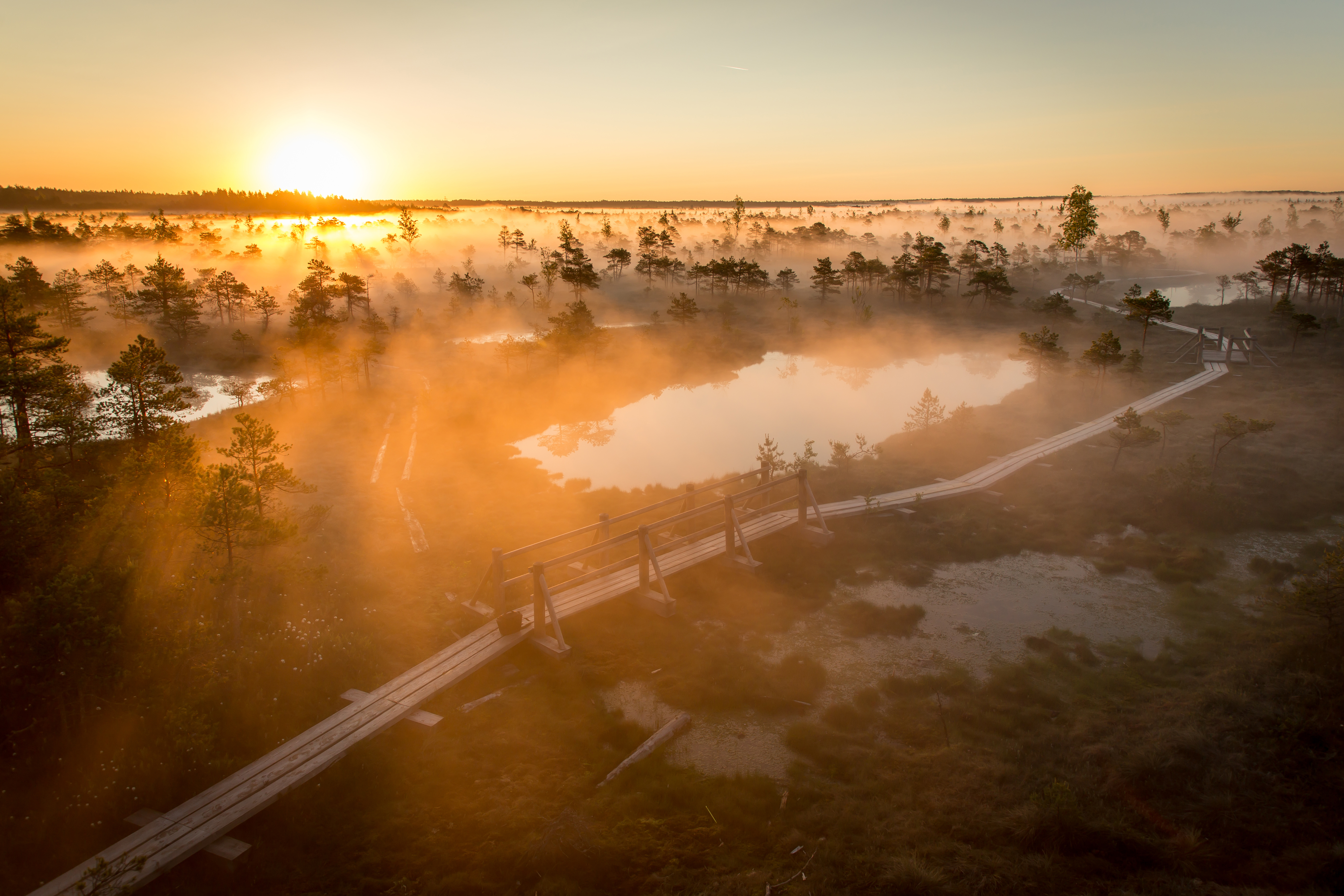
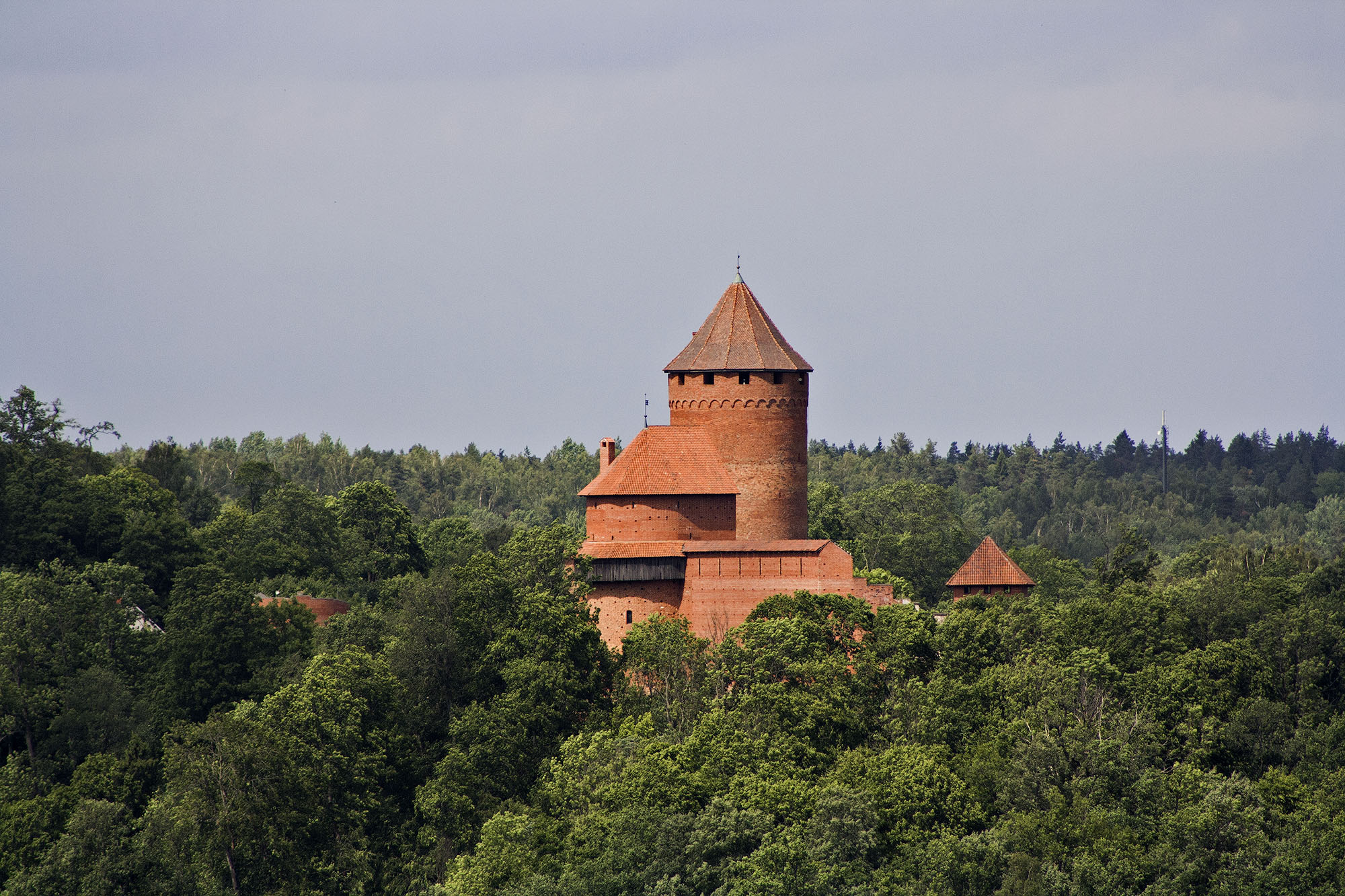
- From top, left to right: Riga Old Town; Beach in Jūrmala; Ķemeri National Park; Turaida Castle

- Coat of arms

- Location of Vidzeme in Latvia
- Coordinates: 57°15′N 25°30′E
- Country: Latvia
- Largest city: Riga

Population
  - Total: 1.3 million
- Time zone: UTC+2 (EET)
  - Summer (DST): UTC+3 (EEST)
- HDI (2019): 0.854 very high · 4th

Vidzeme (pronounced [ˈvid̪͡z̪eme]; Old Latvian orthography: Widda-semme, Livonian: Vidūmō) is one of the Historical Latvian Lands. The capital of Latvia, Riga, is situated in the southwestern part of the region. Literally meaning "the Middle Land", Vidzeme is situated in north-central Latvia north of the Daugava River. Sometimes in German, it was also known as Livland, the German form from Latin Livonia, though it comprises only a small part of Medieval Livonia and about half (the Latvian part) of Swedish Livonia. Most of the region's inhabitants are Latvians (85%), thus Vidzeme is the most ethnically Latvian region in the country.

The historic Governorate of Livonia is also larger than Vidzeme, since it corresponds roughly to Swedish Livonia.

== History ==
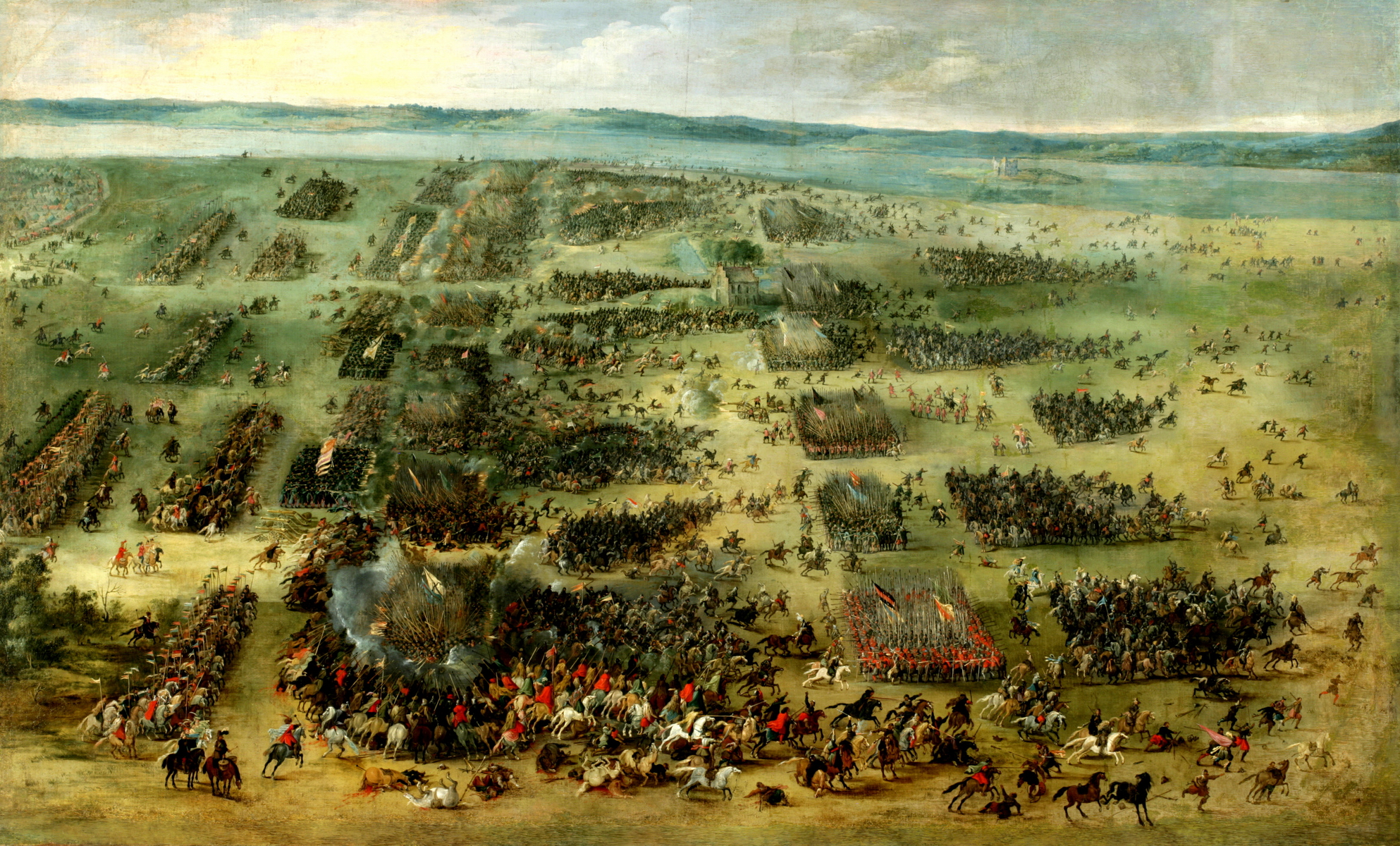
Battle of Kircholm, 1605

In ancient times, the territory of Vidzeme was inhabited by Latgalians and Livs (near the coast of the Gulf of Riga and along the lower reaches of the Daugava and Gauja rivers). Until the German conquest in the 13th century the Daugava, which now forms the south-east border of Vidzeme, was the boundary between the lands of the Livs and Latgalians on the right bank and those of the Semigallians and Selonians on the left bank of the river. The most notable Latgalian region in today's Vidzeme was Tālava.

After the Livonian War, part of the Livonian Confederation on the right bank of the Daugava river and the Patrimony of Riga was ceded to the Polish–Lithuanian Commonwealth, and the Duchy of Livonia (the left bank forming the Duchy of Courland and Semigalia).

Afterwards, the region was invaded by Sweden in 1600, 1617 and 1621. After the Polish-Swedish War concluded by the Truce of Altmark in 1629, Sweden acquired the western part of the Duchy of Livonia roughly as far as the Aiviekste River, since then forming Vidzeme's eastern border.

During the course of the Great Northern War, Swedish Livonia was conquered by the Russian Empire and ceded to Russia at the Treaty of Nystad in 1721. In place of Livonia the Russians created the Riga Governorate, but in 1796 the Riga Governorate was renamed the Governorate of Livonia, administered autonomously by the local German Baltic nobility through a feudal Landtag. After the end of World War I it was split between the newly independent countries of Latvia and Estonia. In 1920, the region's earliest airport, Vecbebri Airfield was established near Bebri Parish as a civil airport, hosting aviation festivals. The establishment of Gulbene Airfield near Gulbene soon followed, opened in 1924 for the Latvian Air Force. During World War II, the region was occupied by the Soviet Union from 1940, and then by Nazi Germany from 1941 to 1944.

With the dissolution of the Soviet Union, Vidzeme became part of independent Latvia once more and it remains so to this day. Although Vidzeme is not an administrative entity today, the Vidzeme Planning Region, with an area of 19,770 square kilometres (7,630 sq mi) and a population of 273,835 in 2024, includes much of the traditional region. The remainder of Vidzeme is part of the Riga Planning Region.

== Subregions ==
The territory of the region of Vidzeme is defined by Latvian law as follows:

- Ādaži Municipality
- Cēsis Municipality
- Gulbene Municipality
- Limbaži Municipality
- Riga
- Ropaži Municipality
- Salaspils Municipality
- Saulkrasti Municipality
- Sigulda Municipality
- Smiltene Municipality
- Valka Municipality
- Valmiera Municipality
- Part of Aiviekste Parish
- Part of Aizkraukle Parish
- The Part of Aizkraukle on the right bank of the Daugava
- Bebri Parish
- Irši Parish
- Klintaine Parish
- Koknese Parish
- Koknese
- Part of Pļaviņas
- Skrīveri Parish
- Vietalva Parish
- Alsviķi Parish
- Alūksne
- Anna Parish
- Ilzene Parish
- Jaunalūksne Parish
- Jaunanna Parish
- Jaunlaicene Parish
- Kalncempji Parish
- Maliena Parish
- Mālupe Parish
- Mārkalne Parish
- Pededze Parish
- Veclaicene Parish
- Zeltiņi Parish
- Ziemeri Parish
- Part of Baldone Parish
- Baldone
- Baloži
- Part of Ķekava Parish
- Arona Parish
- Part of Barkava Parish
- Bērzaune Parish
- Cesvaine Parish
- Dzelzava Parish
- Ērgļi Parish
- Indrān Parish
- Jumurda Parish
- Kalsnava Parish
- Lazdona Parish
- Liezēre Parish
- Lubāna
- Ļaudona Parish
- Madona
- Mārciena Parish
- Mētriena Parish
- Part of Ošupe Parish
- Prauliena Parish
- Sarkaņi Parish
- Sausnēja Parish
- Vestiena Parish
- Part of Babīte Parish
- Mārupe Parish
- Sala Parish
- Ikšķile
- Jumprava Parish
- Krape Parish
- The part of Ķegums city of the right bank of the Daugava
- Ķeipene Parish
- Laubere Parish
- Lēdmane Parish
- Lielvārde Parish
- Madliena Parish
- Mazozoli Parish
- Meņģele Parish
- Ogre
- Ogresgals Parish
- Rembate Parish
- Suntaži Parish
- Taurupe Parish
- Tīnūži Parish
- Part of Olaine Parish
- Olaine and Lapmežciems Parish.
- Jūrmala

== See also ==
- North Vidzeme Biosphere Reserve
- Vidzeme University of Applied Sciences
- Vidzeme Upland
