= Liepna =

Village in Latvia

- Village
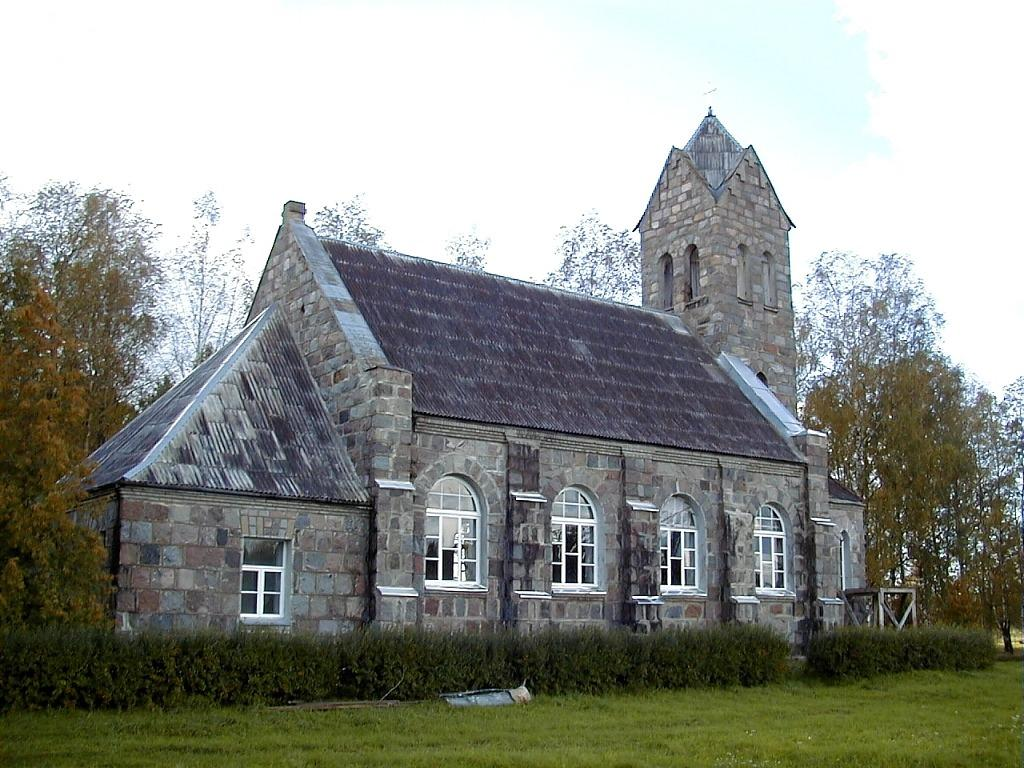
- Liepna Church

- Location in Latvia
- Coordinates: 57°20′36″N 27°28′38″E
- Country: Latvia
- Municipality: Alūksne Municipality
- Elevation: 125 m (410 ft)

Population (2022)
  - Total: 374
- Time zone: UTC+2 (EET)
  - Summer (DST): UTC+3 (EEST)
- Postal code: LV-4354

Liepna is a village in the Liepna Parish of Alūksne Municipality in the Latgale region of Latvia. It is the center of the parish. It is located on the banks of the Liepna river at the intersection of highways P41 and P42, 34 km (21 mi) from Alūksne and 233 km (145 mi) from Riga.

Liepna was established after 1840 near the center of Lipna manor. In 1926, it was granted the status of a densely populated area. In Liepna, there is a parish administration, 2 shops, a primary school, a folk house, a library, an ambulance, three churches (Catholic, Lutheran, Orthodox). Until 2019, there was also a boarding primary school.
