= Vecbebri Airfield =

Former airport in Bebri, Latvia

Vecbebri State Farm Technical School Airfield Vecbebru Sovhoztehnikuma Lidlauks
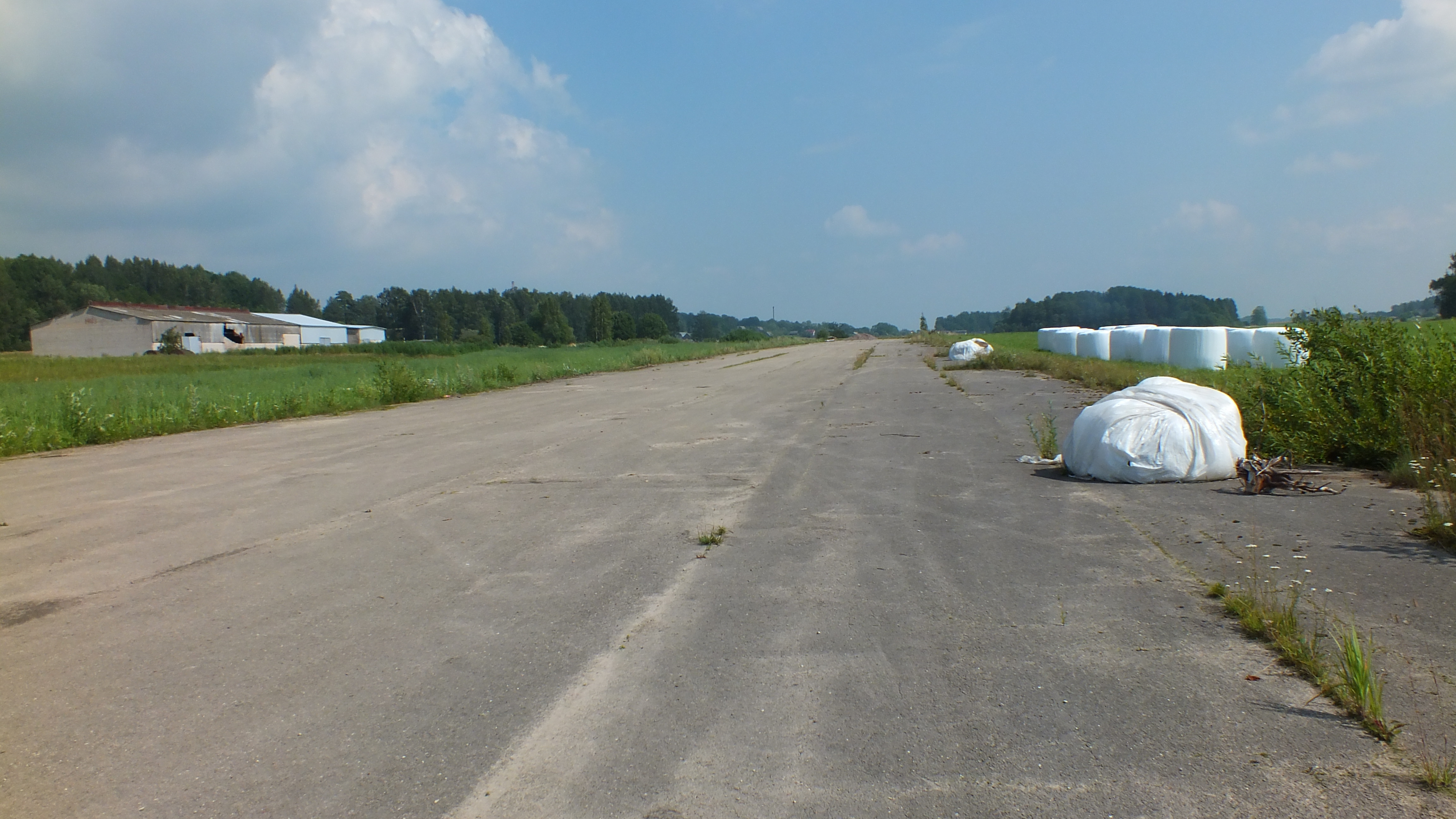
- Runway of Vecbebri Airfield taken in 2015.
- IATA: none; ICAO: none

Summary
- Airport type: Defunct
- Location: Aizkraukle Municipality
- Opened: 1920; 106 years ago
- Closed: 1990s
- Coordinates: 56°43′13″N 25°27′23″E

Map
- Location of Vecbebri Airfield shown within Latvia

Runways
Direction	Length		Surface
Direction	ft	m	Surface
09/27	1,312	400	Asphalt

Vecbebri Airfield, also known as Koknese Airfield, was an agricultural airfield located in the Bebri Parish of Aizkraukle Municipality in the Vidzeme region of Latvia. It was established in 1920, mainly hosting civilian operations and aviation festivals until Soviet annexation in 1940. It was used by the Luftwaffe during World War II, and was built in 1979 by the Soviet Union for agricultural aviation.

== History ==
Vecbebri Airfield was established sometime in 1920 as a civilian landing ground. On 29 August 1937, an aviation festival was held at the airfield. On 26 September 1937, Vecbebri Airfield was used as a waypoint for the Flight Around Latvia competition. During this time, Vecbebri Airfield also functioned as an auxiliary airfield for the Latvian Army Aviation Regiment. Two more aviation festivals were held on 28 August 1938, and on 20 August 1939. Civilian operations ceased at Vecbebri Airfield due to the Soviet annexation of Latvia in 1940. On 15 June 1941, the airfield was improved by the Soviets, and was not used by Russian units prior to July 1944. In mid-summer of 1944, the Germans pursued construction of Vecbebri Airfield, preparing it for military use. It was known as Kokenhusen, and was equipped with a natural surface landing ground measuring 650 x 500 meters. From 31 July 1944, until August 1944, the Nachtschlachtgruppe 3 of the Luftwaffe was stationed.

=== Post-war ===
Vecbebri Airfield was constructed in 1979 with an area of 1.4356 hectares. It was built as part of a state-funded agricultural infrastructure project, which also included pig facilities for 8,311 places, a grain and seed warehouse at Sunākste kolkhoz for 2,000 tons, and other facilities. The airfield was built with a 400-meter long and 20-meter wide asphalt runway, equipped with an apron and hangar on the northeast end. The total capital investment for these facilities reached 11,196 thousand rubles. The airfield was part of a sovhoztehnikum (state-run agricultural technical school), and was used for mainly agricultural aviation operations. Antonov An-2 aircraft from Vecbebri Airfield began fertilizing fields in kolkhoz Rīts and kolkhoz Koknese. In spring of 1986, Antonov An-2 from the airfield managed to fertilize 175 ha of winter crops, 140 ha of pasture, and 208 ha in kolkhoz Rīts, while over 300 ha of winter crops were fertilized in kolkhoz Rīts. The airfield operated alongside Neretā Airfield, both covering the region's agricultural needs.

After Latvia gained independence in 1991, agricultural aviation declined, leading to the abandonment of Vecbebri Airfield. The Ministry of Transport also saw that it was unnecessary to maintain the airfield due to financial costs. By 1994, about 63 small agricultural airfields, including Vecbebri, were disused and left to degrade.

== Present ==
In September 2010, the runway was reported to have good surface condition, with minimal overgrowth except for a bush at the end of runway 09. It was clear of obstacles, with the apron being used for agricultural activities. In 2011, local authorities requested permission to scatter peat over ice on the Daugava to accelerate ice melting, reduce ice jams, and prevent floods. The plan was to spread peat over a 4.5-kilometer river stretch just downstream of Pļaviņas, and was to be done with Antonov An-2 aircraft operating from Koknese Airfield.

== Accidents & incidents ==
- On 12 April 1920, a Sopwith 1½ Strutter designated as #5254 piloted by V. Skrastiņš crashed at Koknese while en route to Rēzekne.
- On 15 April 1920, a Sopwith 1½ Strutter designated as #5248 piloted by V. Korobovskis and A. Joniškans force-landed at Koknese Airfield while en route to Rēzekne.
- On 27 May 1931, an Airco DH.9A designated as #65 experienced engine failure, and emergency landed along the Pļaviņas-Koknese highway.
- On 19 July 1931, a Martinsyde ADC1 designated as #60 piloted by J. Rucels crashed along the Daugava near Koknese.

== See also ==
- Skrunda Airfield
- Priekule Airfield
- Agriculture in the Soviet Union
