= Ķekava =

Town and capital of Ķekava Municipality, Latvia

- City
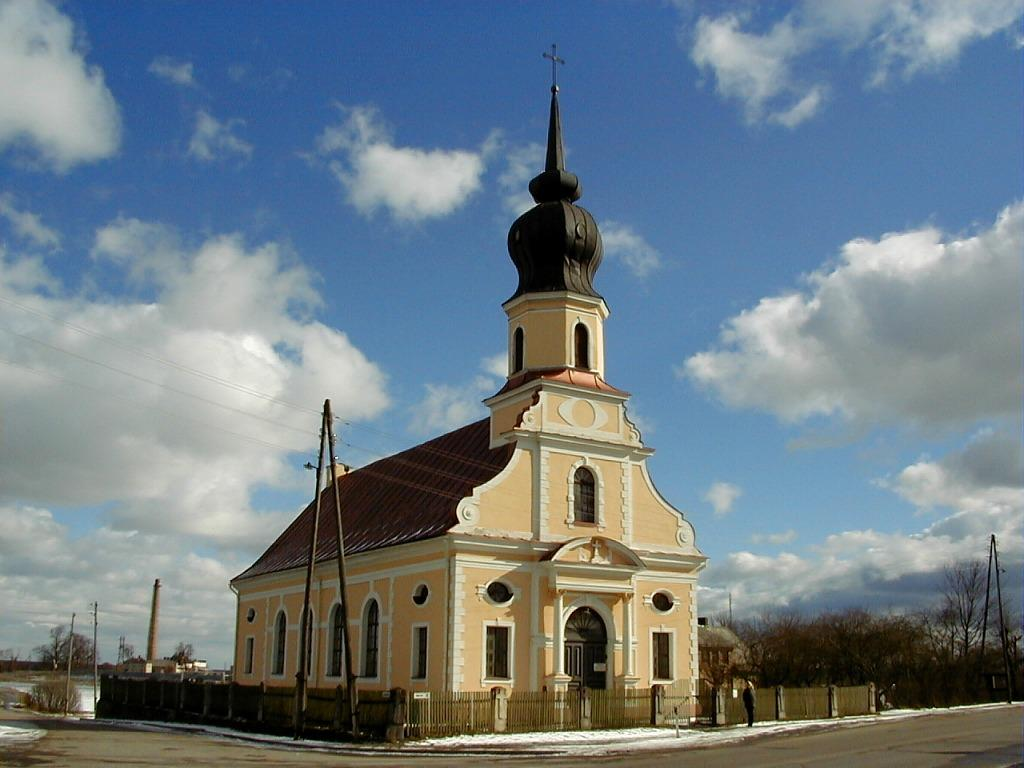
- Ķekava (Dole) Lutheran church

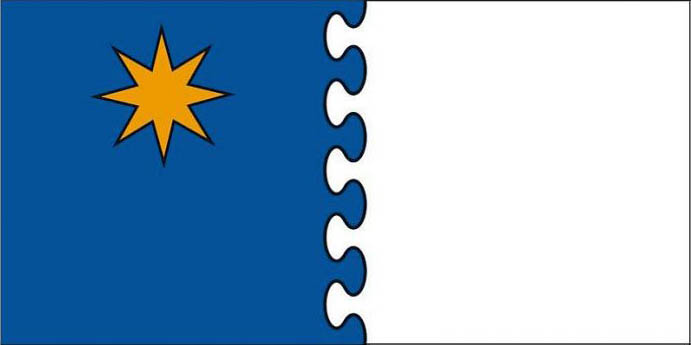
- Flag Coat of arms

- Location within Latvia
- Coordinates: 56°50′N 24°14′E
- Country: Latvia
- Municipality: Ķekava Municipality
- First mentioned: 1435
- City rights: 1 July 2022

Area
  - Total: 9.4 km^{2} (3.6 sq mi)
  - Land: 9.1 km^{2} (3.5 sq mi)
  - Water: 0.3 km^{2} (0.12 sq mi) 3.2%

Population (2022)
  - Total: 5,446
- Time zone: UTC+2 (EET)
  - Summer (DST): UTC+3 (EEST)
- Postal code: 2123
- Callcode: 371
- Website: http://www.kekava.lv

Ķekava (historical German: Keckau) is a city in Latvia and the center of Ķekava Municipality, in the historical region of Vidzeme. It is on the left side of the Sausā Daugava, a tributary of the Daugava River. It is also the extra-territorial center of the adjacent Ķekava Parish.

== Etymology ==
According to the version of the etymologist Konstantīns Karulis, "Ķekava" is a word of Baltic origin: in ancient Indo-European languages, the root "kek" means "bend", and "av(e)" means "moisten, dehydrate, flow". This hydronym probably reflects the course of the Ķekava River: in the upper reaches it runs parallel to the Daugava, but in the middle reaches there are some sharp bends, turning towards the mouth of the Daugava.

== History ==
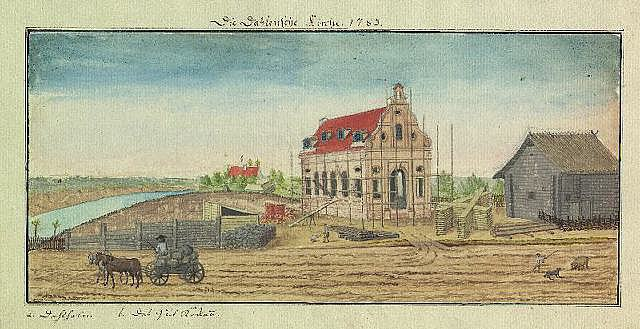
Ķekava's-Dole's church, 1783

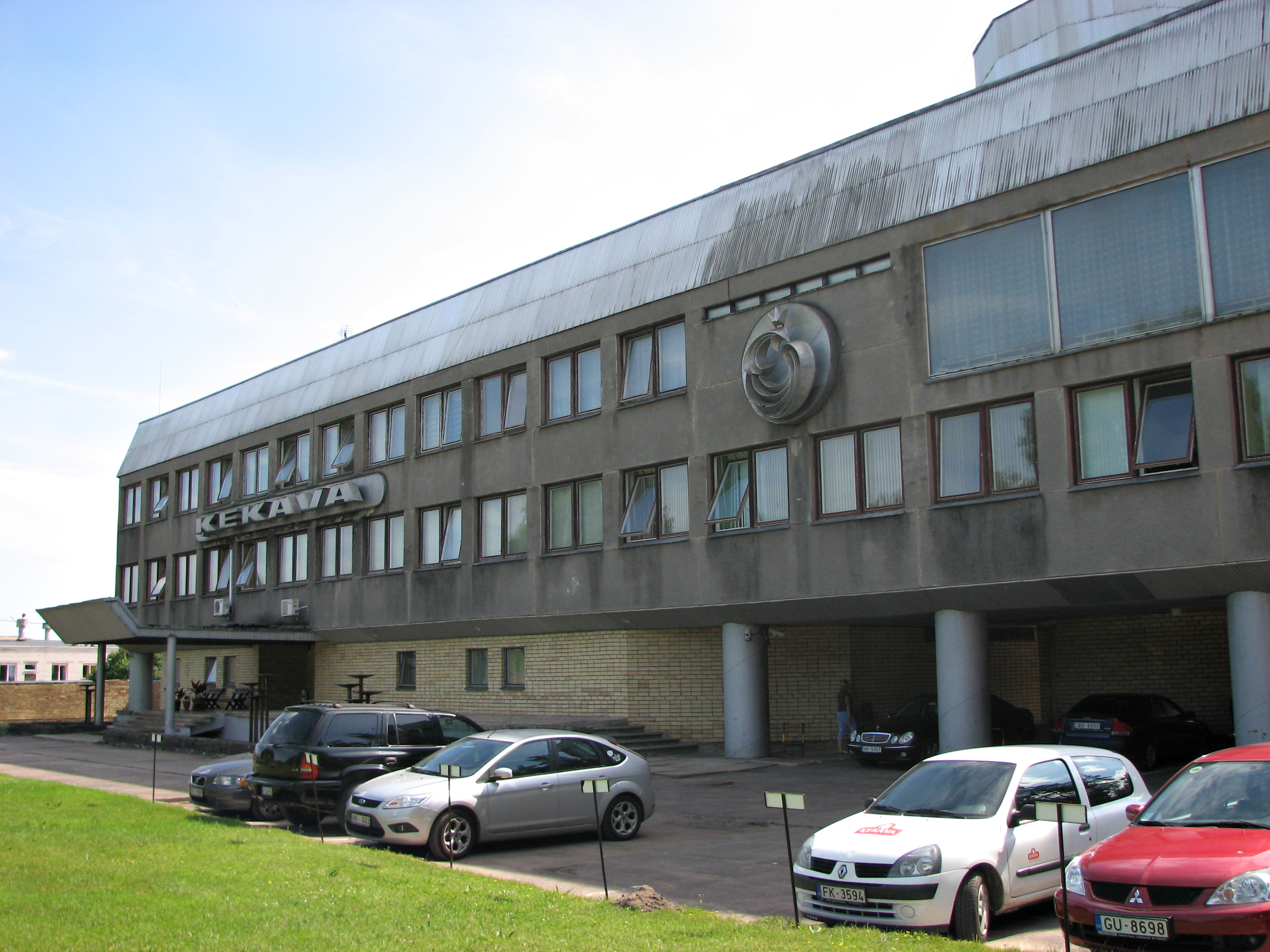
Poultry factory built in 1967.

In 1916, the First Battle of Kekava and Second Battle of Kekava were fought at Ķekava.

Ķekava was a small village until 1970s (with a population of 333 in 1967).

After the creation of the Ķekava kolkhoz and the construction of the poultry factory (Ķekavas putnu fabrika), the village's population increased.

Following the Singing Revolution and collapse of the Soviet Union, the once state-owned factory in the town transitioned into a privately owned enterprise, now known simply as Ķekava. The chickens produced in this factory account for over 95% of all poultry production in Latvia.

After the 2021 Latvian administrative reform, Ķekava gained the status of a city on 1 July 2022.

== Geography ==
=== Roads ===
Roads from Ķekava: Riga—Warsaw (A7), Riga beltway (A5), Ķekava-Plakanciems (V6), Ķekava bypass road (not ended yet).

== Notable places ==
- World War II cemetery Brāļu Kapi (Graves of the Brothers)
- Local History Museum of Ķekava
- Ķekava (Dole) Lutheran Church
- House Of Culture

== Culture ==
Ķekava holds an annual city festival.

== Sport ==
The football club Auda, headquartered in Ķekava, participates in the Latvian First League championships, with their youth and junior teams engaging in the Latvian Youth Football Championship.

Ķekava has the floorball club Ķekavas Bulldogs, fielding both men's and women's teams

=== Gallery ===
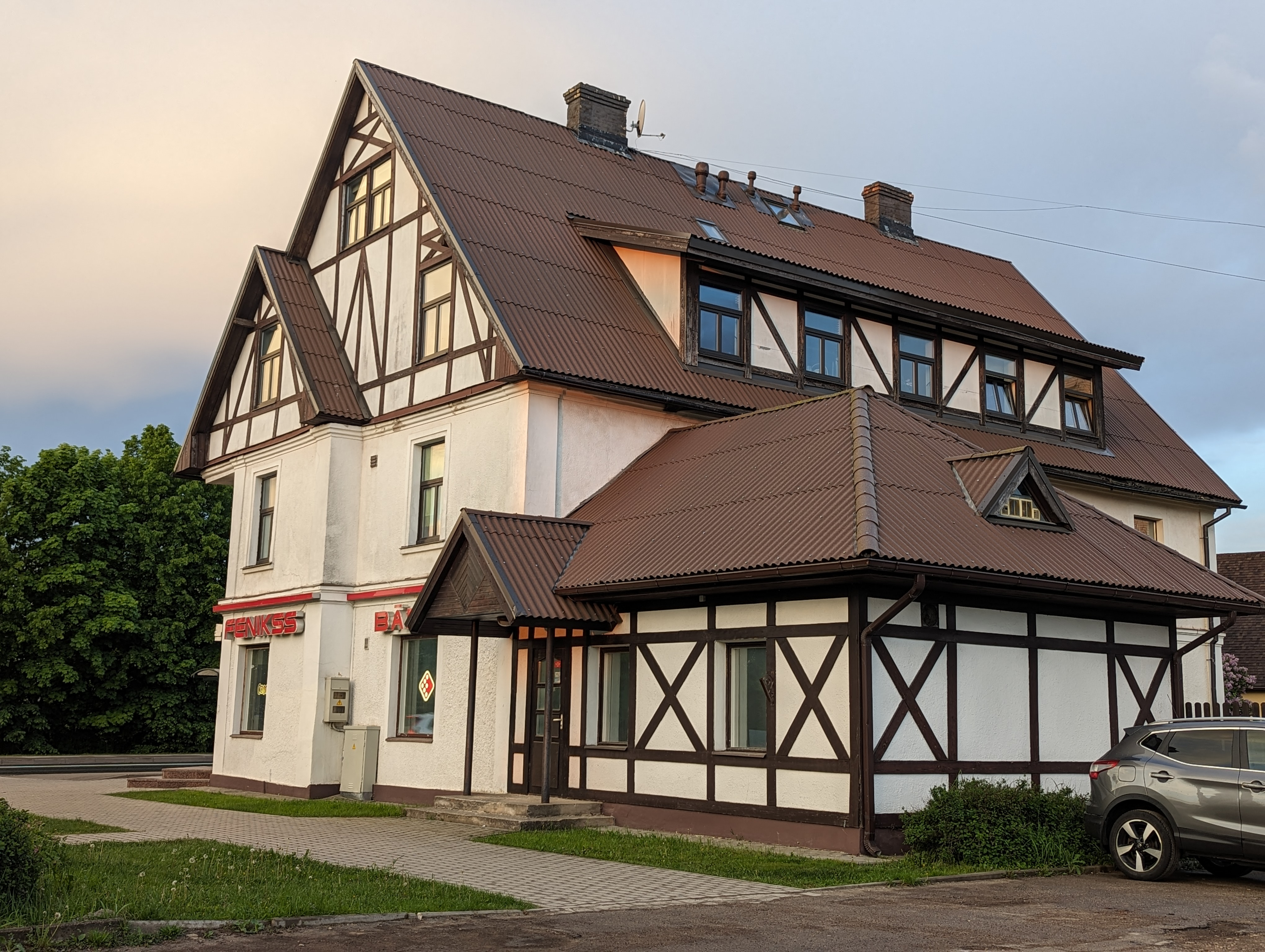

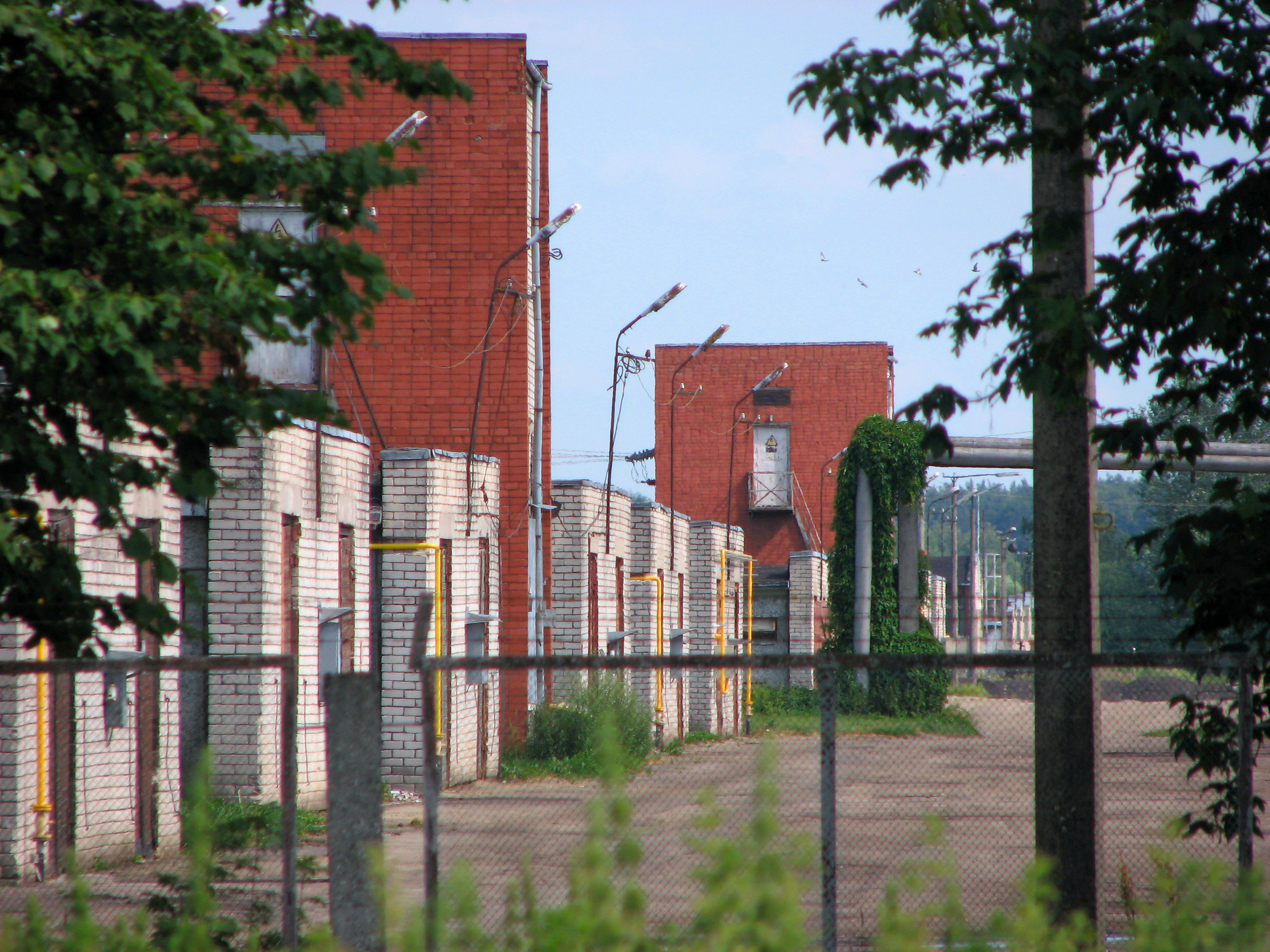
Chicken meat factory

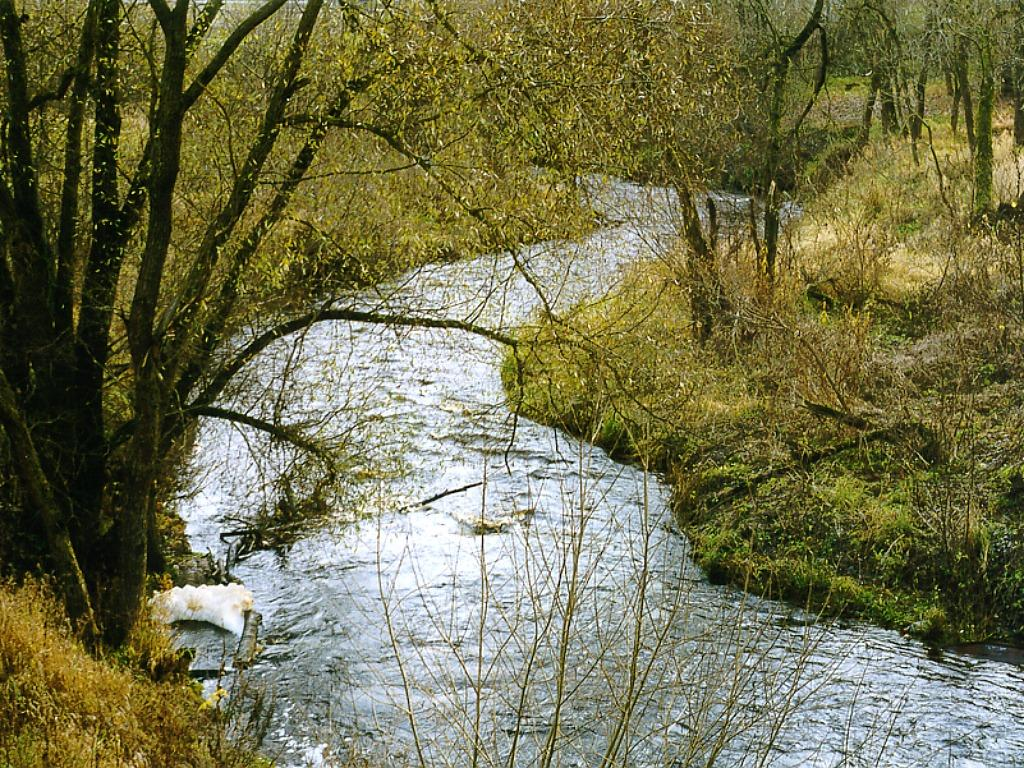
River Ķekaviņa

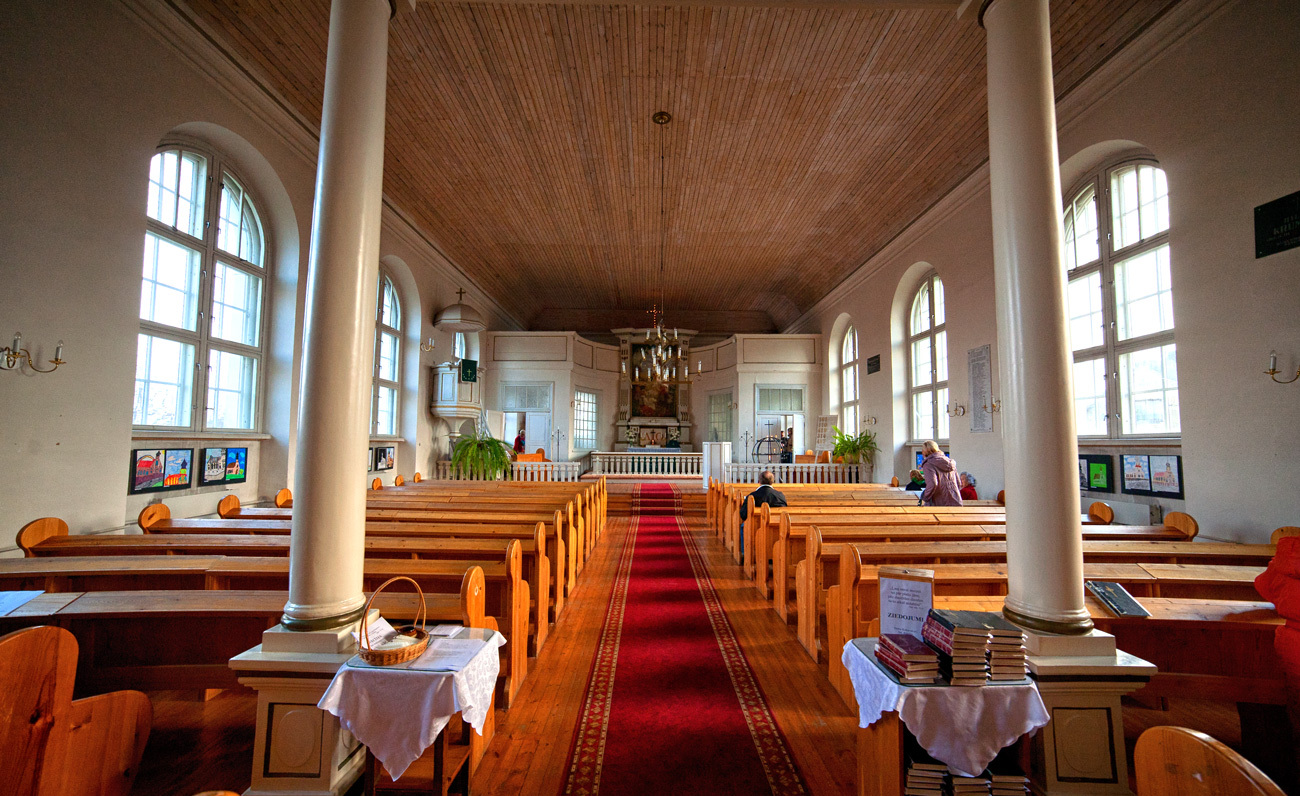
In church
