= Ķekava Municipality =

Municipality of Latvia

Coordinates: 56°52′N 24°07′E

Ķekava Municipality Ķekavas novads
- Municipality
- Flag Coat of arms

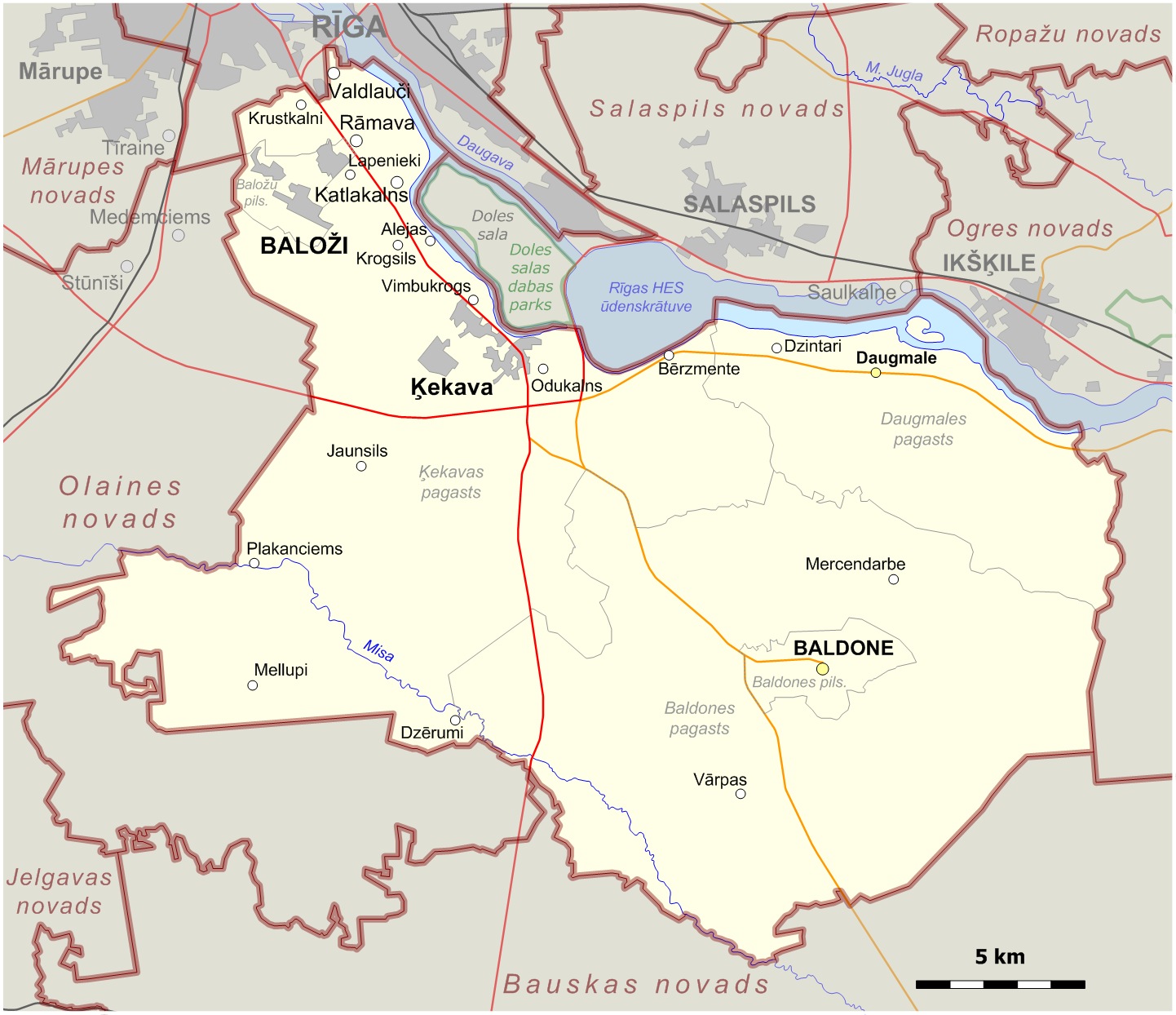
- Country: Latvia
- Formed: 2009
- Reformed: 2021
- Centre: Ķekava
- Subdivisions: List: Baloži Baldone Baldone Parish Daugmale Parish Ķekava Ķekava Parish

Government
  - Council Chair: Viktorija Baire (Vienotība)

Area
  - Total: 444.26 km^{2} (171.53 sq mi)
  - Land: 419.25 km^{2} (161.87 sq mi)

Population (2026)
  - Total: 31,668
  - Density: 75.535/km^{2} (195.63/sq mi)
- Website: www.kekava.lv

Ķekava Municipality (Latvian: Ķekavas novads) is a municipality in Latvia. The municipality was formed in 2009 by merging Baloži town, Daugmale Parish and Ķekava Parish, the administrative centre being Ķekava.

On 1 July 2021, Ķekava Municipality was enlarged when the former Baldone Municipality was merged into it. The territory of Ķekava Municipality is defined by Latvian law as belonging partly of the region of Vidzeme and partly to Semigallia.

== Sightseeing ==
- Local History Museum of Ķekava
- Museum of Daugmale elementary school
- Pines of Katlakalns
- Ostvald's canal
- Ķekava (Dole) Lutheran Church
- Lutheran church in Odukalns
- Katlakalns Church
- Dole Recreation center
- Ķekava primary school
- Manor house of Rāmava
- Memorial stone to honor repressed people from the region
- E. Ostwald's Memorial stone
- Gravestones of Garlieb Merkel and Johann Heinrich Baumann in Katlakalns cemetery
- Memorial stone for Roberts Mūrnieks
- Memorial stone "Refugee road"
- Jāņi Hill – sacred hill of ancestors
- Death Island
- World War I cemetery at Truseļi
- Katlakalns World War I cemetery
- Baloži Frog
- Fountain in Baloži
- Titurga lake
- Daugmale castle mound
- Mūlkalns

== Twin towns — sister cities ==
Ķekava is twinned with:

- Bordesholm, Germany
- Braslaw, Belarus
- Gostyń, Poland
- Nilüfer, Turkey
- Nizami, Azerbaijan
- Pskov, Russia
- Raseiniai, Lithuania
- Lerum, Sweden

== Notable people ==
- Jānis Kalnbērziņš (1893–1986), a Latvian Soviet politician and the first secretary of the Communist Party of Latvia and the first de facto leader of the Latvian Soviet Socialist Republic.
- Viktors Arājs (1910 in Baldone – 1988), a Latvian/Baltic German collaborator and Nazi SS SD officer
- Inga Bite (born 1981), politician, a deputy of the 11th Saeima (Latvian Parliament)

=== Sport ===
- Astra Klovāne (born 1944 in Baldone), former Latvian chess player, she won the Latvian Chess Championship for women seven times
- Zigurds Lanka (born 1960 in Baldone), a Latvian chess player, lives in Germany
- Agnis Čavars (born 1986 in Ķekava), basketball player, team gold medallist at the 2020 Summer Olympics
- Nauris Miezis (born 1991 in Ķekava), basketball player, team gold medallist at the 2020 Summer Olympics

== See also ==
- Administrative divisions of Latvia
