= First Battle of Ķekava =

1st Battle of Kekava
- Part of the Eastern Front of World War I
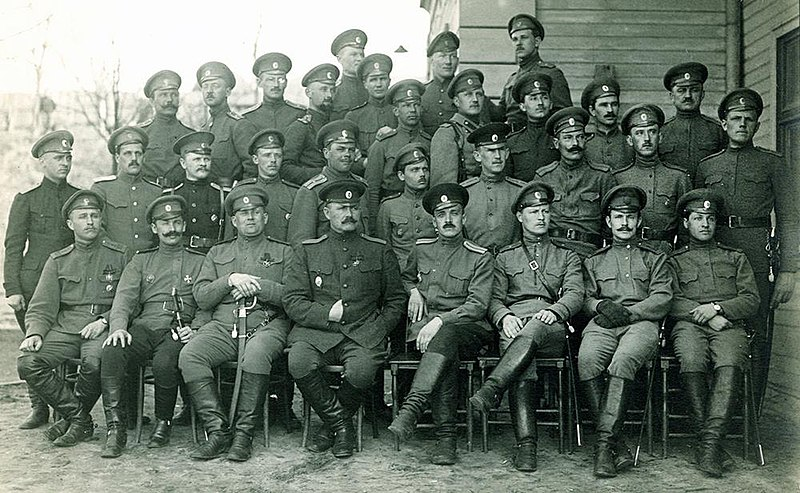
- Officers of the 1st Daugavgrīva Latvian Rifle Battalion after the battle
Date	21 March 1916
Location	Kekava, Latvia
Result	Inconclusive

Belligerents
Russian Empire	Germany

Commanders and leaders
Radko Dimitriev	Oskar von Hutier

Units involved
13th Siberian Rifle Division; Latvian Riflemen	35th Infantry Reserve Regiment

Casualties and losses
704 casualties	63 killed 87 injured

The First Battle of Kekava occurred in March 1916 in Kekava, Latvia, along the Eastern Front during World War I.

== Background ==
Following Russian retreats, Russian forces ended up outside of Kekava and decided to begin an attack alongside the Lake Naroch offensive.

== Forces ==
The 13th Siberian Rifle Division of the 12th Army of the Imperial Russian Army fought against the 35th Infantry Reserve Regiment of the Imperial German Army and were joined by Latvian Riflemen battalions.

== Battle ==
The attack at Ķekava began on March 21, 1916, in meadows flooded by the tides. After an artillery shelling of the enemy's forts, Latvian riflemen and soldiers of the 51st Siberian Rifle Regiment advanced towards the German fortified positions. Despite initial success of the first two Latvian rifle battalions, it was not possible to maintain the front brake for a long time. The Germans, attracting additional reserves, launched a counterattack in the evening to regain lost positions. the German forces then them back to their starting positions.

== Aftermath ==
Following the battle, another battle, the second Battle of Ķekava took place in July in the same region.
