= Skrunda =

Town in Kuldīga Municipality, Latvia

- Town
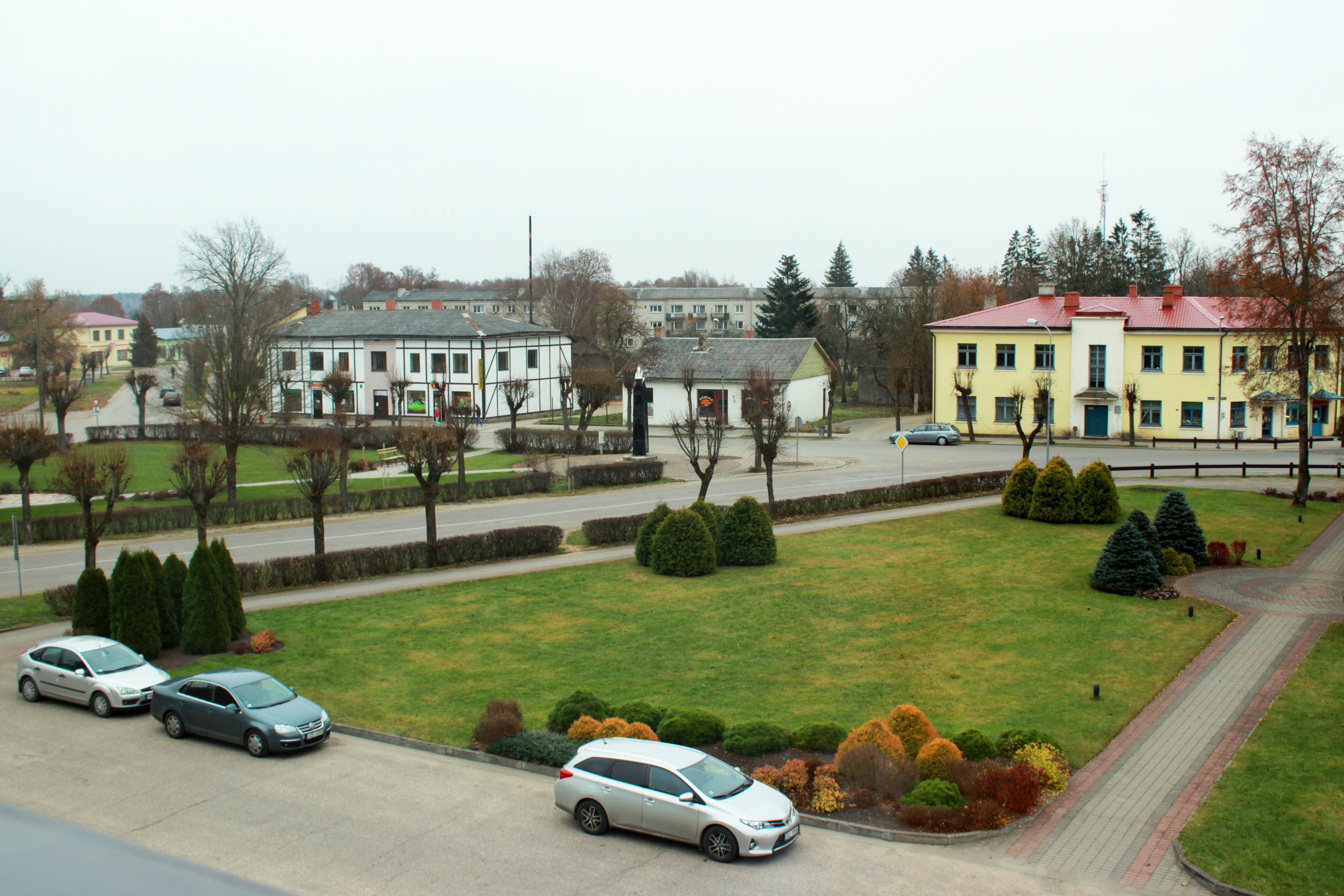
- Town centre of Skrunda

- Flag Coat of arms

- Location in Latvia
- Coordinates: 56°40′N 22°0′E
- Country: Latvia
- Municipality: Kuldīga Municipality
- Town rights: 1996

Government
  - Mayor: Loreta Robežniece

Area
  - Total: 4.43 km^{2} (1.71 sq mi)
  - Land: 4.26 km^{2} (1.64 sq mi)
  - Water: 0.17 km^{2} (0.066 sq mi)
  - Rural territory: 257.908 km^{2} (99.579 sq mi)
- Elevation: 50 m (160 ft)

Population (2026)
  - Total: 1,704
  - Density: 400/km^{2} (1,040/sq mi)
- Time zone: UTC+2 (EET)
  - Summer (DST): UTC+3 (EEST)
- Postal code: LV-3326
- Calling code: +371 633
- Number of city council members: 9
- Website: http://www.skrunda.lv/

Skrunda (German: Schrunden) is a town in the Courland region of Latvia. It lies 150 km (95 mi) west of the capital city Riga in Kuldīga Municipality.

== History ==
The historical sources first mentioned Skrunda (German: Schrunden) in the Curonian Peninsula in 1253. In 1368 the Skrunda Castle of the German Order was built on the left bank of Venta. During the Duchy of Courland and Semigallia period glass mills, powder mills, and nail, gun, and rifle workshops were operating in Skrunda. The finished products were transported down the Venta River. From 1685, through Skrunda, the main postal route of the Dukedom was Jelgava - Dobele - Blīdene - Saldus - Skrunda - Grobiņa - Liepāja - Sventa - Mēmele. During the Swedish invasion of the Great Northern War, the town was plundered. At the beginning of the 19th century, near the ruins of the former Order Castle, the Skrunda Manor House was built in the classic style. It was restored in 1881.

The settlement began to form after the construction of the narrow-gauge railway line Liepāja - Aizpute, Aizpute - Skrunda - Saldus, during the First World War. During the struggle for freedom in Latvia, between 22 and 29 January 1919, at Skrunda a major battle took place between the 2nd Soviet Latvian Riflemen's Regiment and the Latvian Special Battalion, under the leadership of Oskars Kalpaks. After the agrarian reform of 1920, the lands of Skrunda's manor were divided into building plots. In 1925 Skrunda was given the status of a densely populated (village) estate. With the opening of the Glüda-Liepāja high-speed railway line in 1929, the economic development of Skrunda accelerated. In 1935 in Skrunda there were about 50 small businesses, as well as several industrial enterprises including watermills, linen processing workshop, two sawmills, and two mechanical workshops.

In the 1930s, the nearby Skrunda Airfield was established. It operated as a venue for multiple civil aviation events until World War II, when it was under German occupation. It was used by the Luftwaffe from October until December 1944. Today, it is abandoned.

In 1950 Skrunda was granted status of a workers' village, and in 1961 it created a town council. In the period from 1950 to 1959, Skrunda was the center of the Skrunda district. In 1969, the VEF factory was built in Skrunda. During the Soviet era there was the Aizpute peat factory, geological and hydrogeological expedition, PMK section, workshops for utility services, "Skrunda" fisheries, and the reloading base of the woodcutting plant "Volcano".

In 1996 Skrunda was granted city rights.

== Skrunda-1 ==
There is a former Soviet secret city near the town - Skrunda-1, which housed two major radar installations during the Cold War period. One radar was demolished in 1995. Pursuant to an agreement between the Republic of Latvia and the Russian Federation, the other radar stations suspended operations on August 31, 1998. In October 1999, after several months of dismantling, the dismantled installations were repatriated to Russia, and the last Russian troops and families vacated the area.

Skrunda-1 is a ghost town, as the last remaining residents abandoned the town in 1999. The Soviet Union, when building secret installations, usually left the name of the settlement off the map and referred to them literally by the name of the nearest town, plus a number (usually a 1).

In February 2010, the town was sold to a Russian investor for 1.6 million Latvian lats ($3.1 million); after that bidder (and a runner-up) backed out, the property was auctioned on June 4, 2010, to Iniciative Europa for 170,000 Latvian lats ($333,000). However, the property remains abandoned with a lone guard blocking the main entrance to keep tourists away. The property then was purchased by Skrunda municipality for €12,000, which in early 2016 started selling tickets for €4 to visit the ghost town. However, failing to generate interest from investors, the municipality gave tenure of the property to the Ministry of Defense. It now forms part of the Mezaine training area.

== See also ==
- List of cities in Latvia
