= Ķekava Parish =

Parish in Ķekava Municipality, Latvia

- parish of Latvia
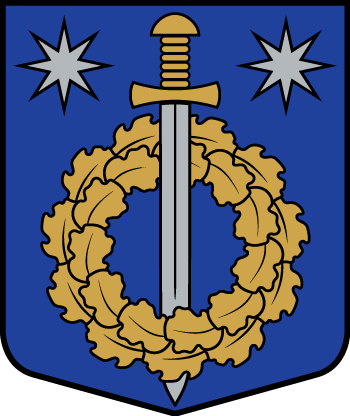
- Coat of arms

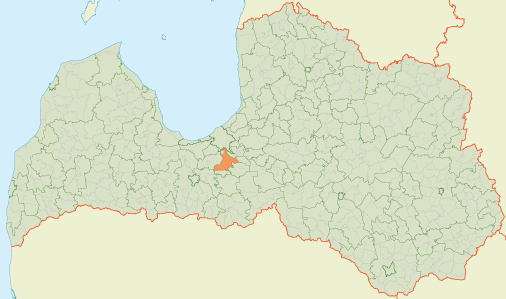
- Coordinates: 56°49′43″N 24°14′23″E
- Country: Latvia

Population (1 January 2026)
  - Total: 12,804

Ķekava Parish (Latvian: Ķekavas pagasts) is an administrative unit of Ķekava Municipality, Latvia. The administrative center is the town of Ķekava, which is located outside the borders of the parish. Ķekava Parish is defined by Latvian law as belonging partly to the region of Vidzeme and partly to Semigallia.

== Villages and settlements of Ķekava Parish ==
- Alejas
- Bērzmente
- Dzērumi
- Katlakalns
- Misas
- Plakanciems
- Rāmava
- Valdlauči
- Vimbukrogs
