= Second Battle of Ķekava =

2nd Battle of Kekava
- Part of the Eastern Front of World War I
Date	16–22 July 1916
Location	Kekava, Latvia
Result	Inconclusive

Belligerents
Russian Empire	Germany

Commanders and leaders
Radko Dimitriev	Oskar von Hutier

Units involved
Latvian Riflemen	35th Infantry Reserve Regiment

Casualties and losses
1,840	Unknown

The Second Battle of Kekava occurred in July 1916 along the Eastern Front during World War I.

== Background ==
Following the failure of the first battle of Kekava, Russia decided to attempt a second attack in July 1916 in support of the British attack at the Somme.

== Participating units ==
The only units on the Russian side participating in the encounter where 5 Latvian rifle battalions. those were as follows: 1. Daugavgrivas, 2. Riga, 6. Tukuma, 7. Bauska and 8. Valmiera.

== Battle ==
The battle was fought in the vicinity of Ķekava, in the area from the Smerdukli marsh to the left bank of the Daugava. The battle began with several hours of artillery fire on the German forts, followed by a Latvian riflemen attack on the German trench lines. However, the artillery shells could not destroy the barbed wire fences, which the infantry was forced to cut during the battle under enemy fire. The riflemen had to cross a swamp that was difficult to cross, being in constant crossfire from the artillery of both warring parties.

== Casualties and gains ==
The Latvian riflemen lost up to 27% of their forces (around 1,840 men) and were unable to make any sort of gains. The 6th battalion in particular, Tukuma, suffered losses of around 90%.
