= Ziemeri Parish =

Parish of Latvia

- parish of Latvia
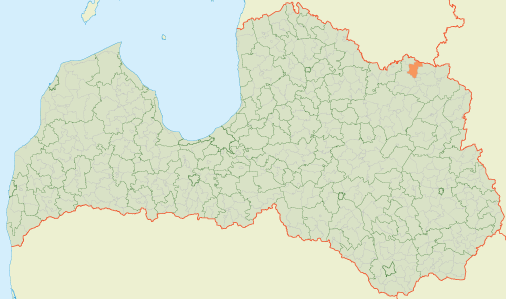
- 57°30′43″N 27°01′47″E
- Country: Latvia

Area
  - Total: 116.78 km^{2} (45.09 sq mi)
  - Land: 114.36 km^{2} (44.15 sq mi)
  - Water: 2.42 km^{2} (0.93 sq mi)

Population (1 January 2025)
  - Total: 648
  - Density: 5.67/km^{2} (14.7/sq mi)

Ziemeri Parish (Latvian: Ziemeru pagasts) is an administrative unit of Alūksne Municipality in the Vidzeme region of Latvia.
