= Gulbene Airfield =

- Gulbene, Vidzeme region in Latvia

Site information
- Type: Military airfield
- Condition: Abandoned

Location
- Location of Gulbene Airfield in Latvia
- Coordinates: 57°09′49″N 26°46′14″E

Site history
- Built: 1924; 102 years ago
- Battles/wars: World War II
- Events: 1938 Flight Around Latvia

Gulbene Airfield, also known as Alt Schwanenburg I, was an airfield located near the town of Gulbene, Vidzeme region of Latvia. It was established in 1924 for the Latvian Air Force, and became one of the largest airfields in the country by the mid-1930s. During World War II, it was taken over by the Soviet Air Forces and later captured by the Germany Army. After the war, the airfield resumed Soviet Air Force operations until closure in the 1990s.

== History ==
In 1924, Gulbene Airfield was established intended for usage by the Latvian Air Force. The airfield was built on ideally flat ground, and had no obstructions from all directions. In 1934, reconnaissance squadrons of the Latvian Air Force were established, and units were subsequently deployed to Gulbene Airfield. By the mid-1930s, the airfield became one of the biggest in Latvia, mainly operating training flights from the Aviation Regiment. Due to a shortage of materials, the construction of facilities in the airfield was delayed. In 1936, construction work on a hangar and ammunition depot only began. In December 1937, the 3rd Reconnaissance Squadron, and the 7th Sigulda Infantry Regiment was based there, allowing the number of army units at the eastern border of Latvia to be increased. On 2 October, 1938, Gulbene Airfield became the third stop on the second day of the Flight Around Latvia competition.

=== World War II ===
In 1940, Gulbene Airfield was taken over by the Soviet Air Forces, and the Aviation Division of the 24th Territorial Corps began operating out of the airfield, flying former Latvian Stampe et Vertongen SV.5 Tornado aircraft. In June, 1941, the 24th Artillery Correction Aviation Squadron was based in the airfield, equipped with 16 obsolete aircraft.

In 1941, the Germany Army captured the airfield, and the Luftwaffe began operating it as a transit point for single-engine units and aircraft flying back and forth between the rear zone of Leningrad. Gulbene Airfield was equipped with a hangar and a workshop, and operated a natural surface landing ground measuring approximately 1100 x 820 meters. Alt Schwanenburg II, an airfield for civilian sports aviation served as the satellite for Gulbene Airfield, although it was never used by the Luftwaffe. It had a natural surface landing ground measuring approximately 300 x 159 meters. The airfield was initially guarded by informal Latvia partisan groups, which were later organized into more formal military units. Gulbene Airfield constantly faced Soviet bombing attacks, however most of their bombs fell outside of the airfield. One bomb managed to hit the corner of the hangar, inflicting minimal damage. Since then, the Germans began stationing fighter aircraft to deter any further attacks. Air crew personnel of the Latvian Night Ground Attack Wing 12 were billeted in the nearby Gulbene Castle. On 25 July, 1944, the Latvian Night Ground Attack Wing 12 completed its 1000th mission while based at Gulbene Airfield. On 28 August, 1944, Gulbene Airfield was retaken by the Red Army.

=== Post-war ===
In the late 1940s, Soviet Army Unit No. 75568 radar company arrived in Gulbene Airfield, and was headquartered in the nearby Velgulbene Manor on Litenes street. Subsequently, three artificially raised radar hills were built, allowing the installation of locator radars. Prior to December 1949, captured German Messerschmitt aircraft and Soviet Yak fighters operated from the airfield. In October 1950, Gulbene Airfield had a field measuring 1500 - 2000 meters in length and 700 - 900 meters in width, and had a barbed wire perimeter fence. Multiple aircraft were also reported to be parked along the northern edge of the airfield, covered by tarpaulin. Initially, residents in Gulbene would have to depart the bus station where dozens of buses lined up to visit Riga and other cities. On 1 June, 1969, a service between Gulbene and Riga was opened, operated by Antonov An-2 aircraft. The flight time per trip would have taken 50 minutes, offering residents a quicker alternative. Ticketing required contacting the Gulbene Airfield chief at the city's executive committee by either visiting or dialing 42. On 22 December 1988, a commission inspection of the radar and radio-technical installation at Gulbene Airfield determined that electromagnetic emissions level exceeded maximum permissible levels for civilian populations. As a result, Soviet Army Unit No. 75568 was relocated to Beļava parish, and the Soviet Army left Gulbene Airfield in 1993, thus ending occupation.

== Present ==
In 1994, an open-air stage was constructed at the former airfield, integrating one of the radar hills for seating. In 2006, the territory of the airfield was cleaned up for future redevelopment, with plans for a children’s recreation, as well as low-rise and multi-storey construction. In 2008, the Gulbene Council prepared a detailed plan to redevelop the surrounding area, including new housing and develop zones on the former airfield. Following inspections that found the open-air stage to be in poor condition, it was demolished in the end of January 2015, costing the municipality almost 6000 euros. The left-behind construction debris from the demolition was recycled for road repairs. Today, two of the three radar hills still remain.

== Units ==
The following lists the units that were based in Gulbene Airfield:

Luftwaffe

- II. Gruppe of Jagdgeschwader 53 (Fighter Wing 53), July 1941
- I. Gruppe of Jagdgeschwader 54 (Fighter Wing 54), July 1941
- I. Gruppe of Schlachtgeschwader 5 (Ground Attack Wing 5), February – March 1944
- 1st Squadron of Nachtschlachtgeschwader 12 (Lettische) (Latvian Night Ground Attack Wing 12), February – March 1944
- 2nd Squadron of Nachtschlachtgeschwader 12 (Lettische) (Latvian Night Ground Attack Wing 12), July 1944 (approximate)
- Fliegerhorst-Kommandantur E 12/III, December 1943 – March 1944
- Fliegerplatzkommandantur B 17/I, February 1944
- Fliegerhorst-Kommandantur E(v) 205/I, April – July 1944
- Feldwerft-Abteilung V/60 (elements), March 1944

== Accidents & incidents ==
- On 4 June, 1940, a Stampe en Vertongen SV.5 took off from Gulbene Airfield, with the pilot turning suddenly while still at low altitude. Subsequently, the aircraft fell into a spin and struck the ground with the engine still running. The aircraft was totally destroyed, killing passenger Sgt. Janis Ozols, and severely injuring Corporal Indrikis Morkans. The passenger was not a member of the aviation regiment, but was rather serving in the chemical weapons unit.
