= Baloži =

Town in Ķekava Municipality, Latvia

- Town
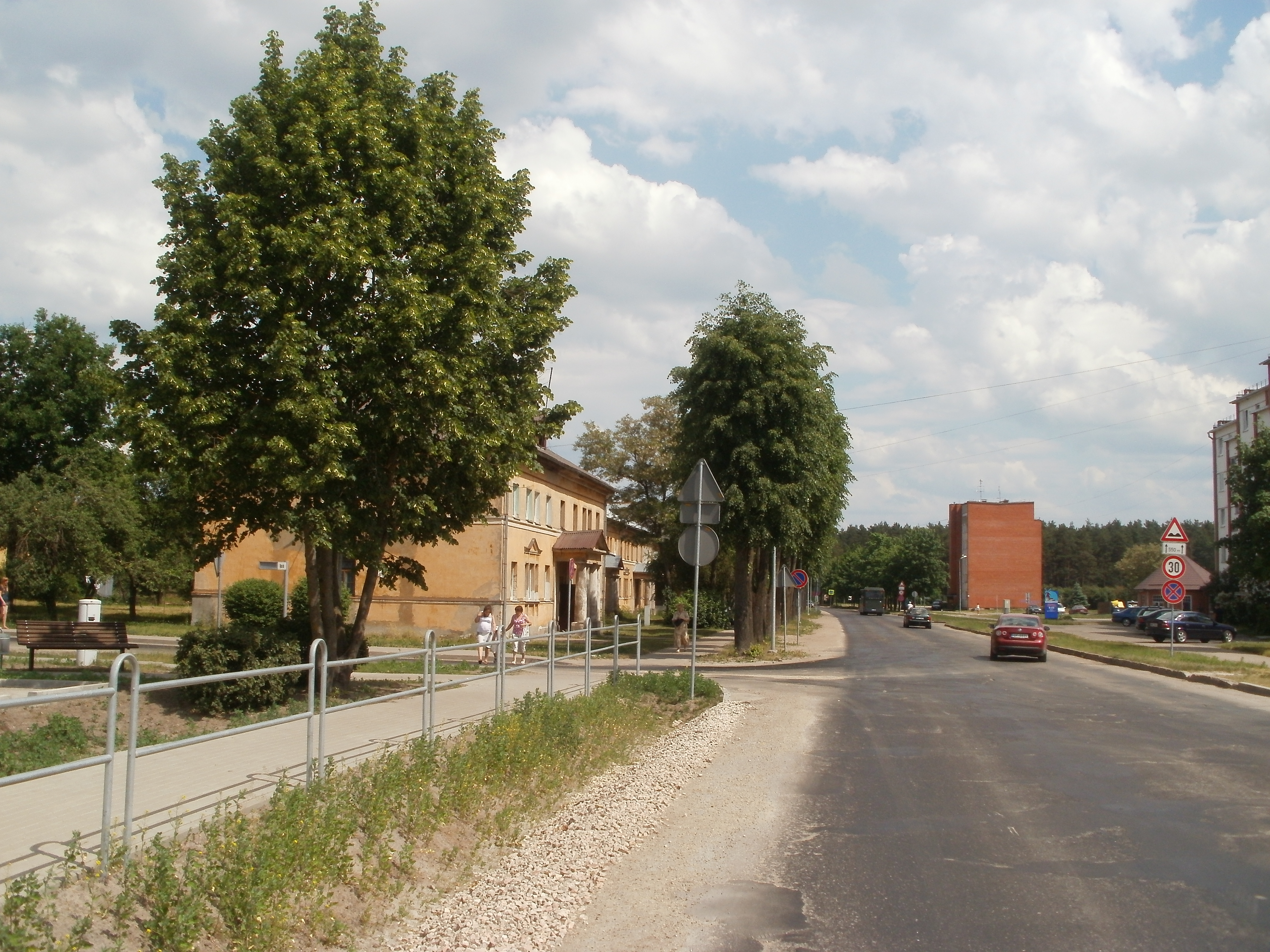
- Riga street in Baloži

- Flag Coat of arms

- Location in Latvia
- Coordinates: 56°52′N 24°7′E
- Country: Latvia
- Municipality: Ķekava Municipality
- Town rights: 1991

Area
  - Total: 7.13 km^{2} (2.75 sq mi)
  - Land: 6.83 km^{2} (2.64 sq mi)
  - Water: 0.3 km^{2} (0.12 sq mi)
- Elevation: 18 m (59 ft)

Population (2026)
  - Total: 6,795
  - Density: 995/km^{2} (2,580/sq mi)
- Time zone: UTC+2 (EET)
  - Summer (DST): UTC+3 (EEST)
- Postal code: LV-2128; LV-2112
- Calling code: +371 67
- Website: www.balozi.lv

Baloži (German: Rollbusch) is a town in Ķekava Municipality, in the Vidzeme region of Latvia, just 12 kilometres from the centre of Riga. In 2021, the city had a population of 6,746 people.

Baloži was founded soon after the Second World War; as a village at the time, it was developed for the nearby peat factory workers. The oldest part of the town is built in a Stalinist style. During the 1970s, territory of the village was expanded towards the A7 highway. During the 1980s, this part was built as a modern residential district and was called Titurga. In 1991, Baloži received town rights. After the Latvian administrative territorial reform of 2009, Baloži became part of the Ķekava Municipality, and thus became one of the few Latvian towns which are not municipal centres.

Baloži is defined by Latvian law as a part of the region of Vidzeme.

== Rail network ==
Baloži had a small rail network. It was 28 kilometres long and was built to transport peat from the local factory.

== See also ==
- List of cities and towns in Latvia
