= Daugmale Parish =

Parish in Ķekava Municipality, Latvia

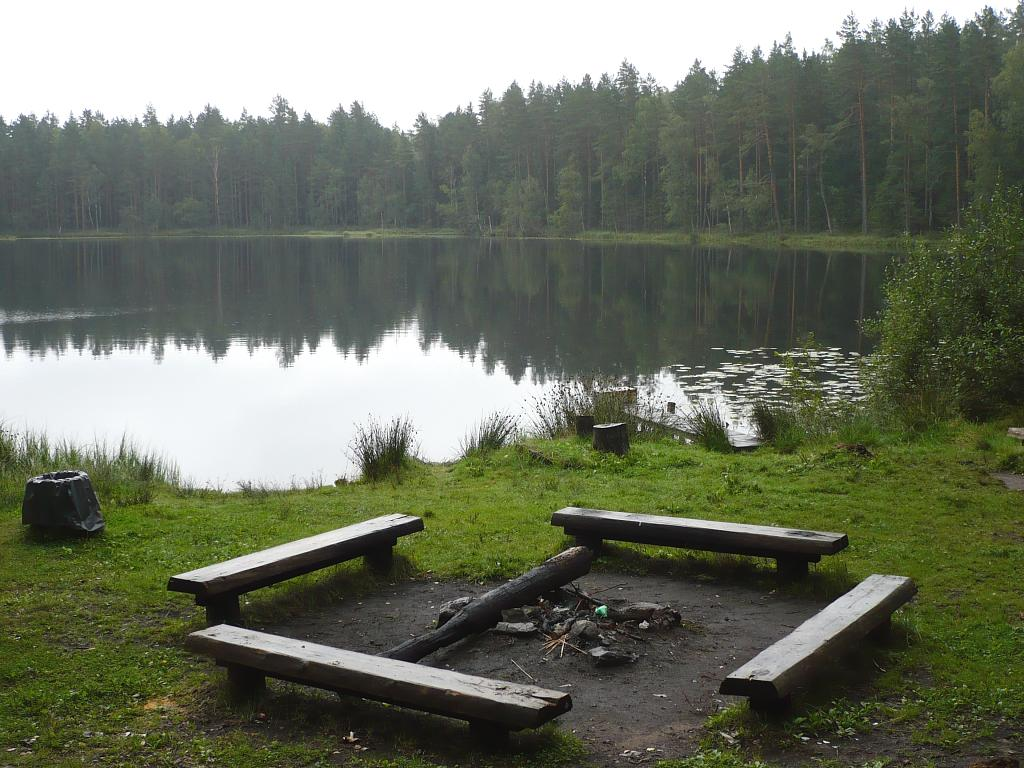
- Lake in Daugmale Parish

- Coat of arms

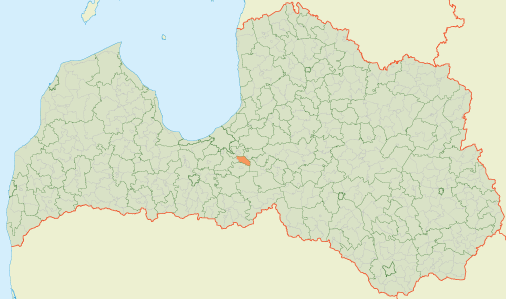
- Interactive map of Daugmale Parish
- Coordinates: 56°48′25″N 24°26′30″E
- Country: Latvia
- Municipality: Ķekava

Area
  - Total: 65.8 km^{2} (25.4 sq mi)

Population (1 January 2026)
  - Total: 1,317
  - Density: 20.0/km^{2} (51.8/sq mi)
- Time zone: Eastern European Time

Daugmale Parish (Latvian: Daugmales pagasts) is an administrative territorial entity of Ķekava Municipality, Latvia. It was an administrative unit of Riga district. The administrative center is Daugmale village. The territory of Daugmale Parish is defined by law as a part of the region of Semigallia.

== Villages and settlements ==
- Daugmale
- Dzintari
