= Saldus Airfield =

Former airport in Saldus, Latvia

Saldus Airfield Saldus Lidlauks
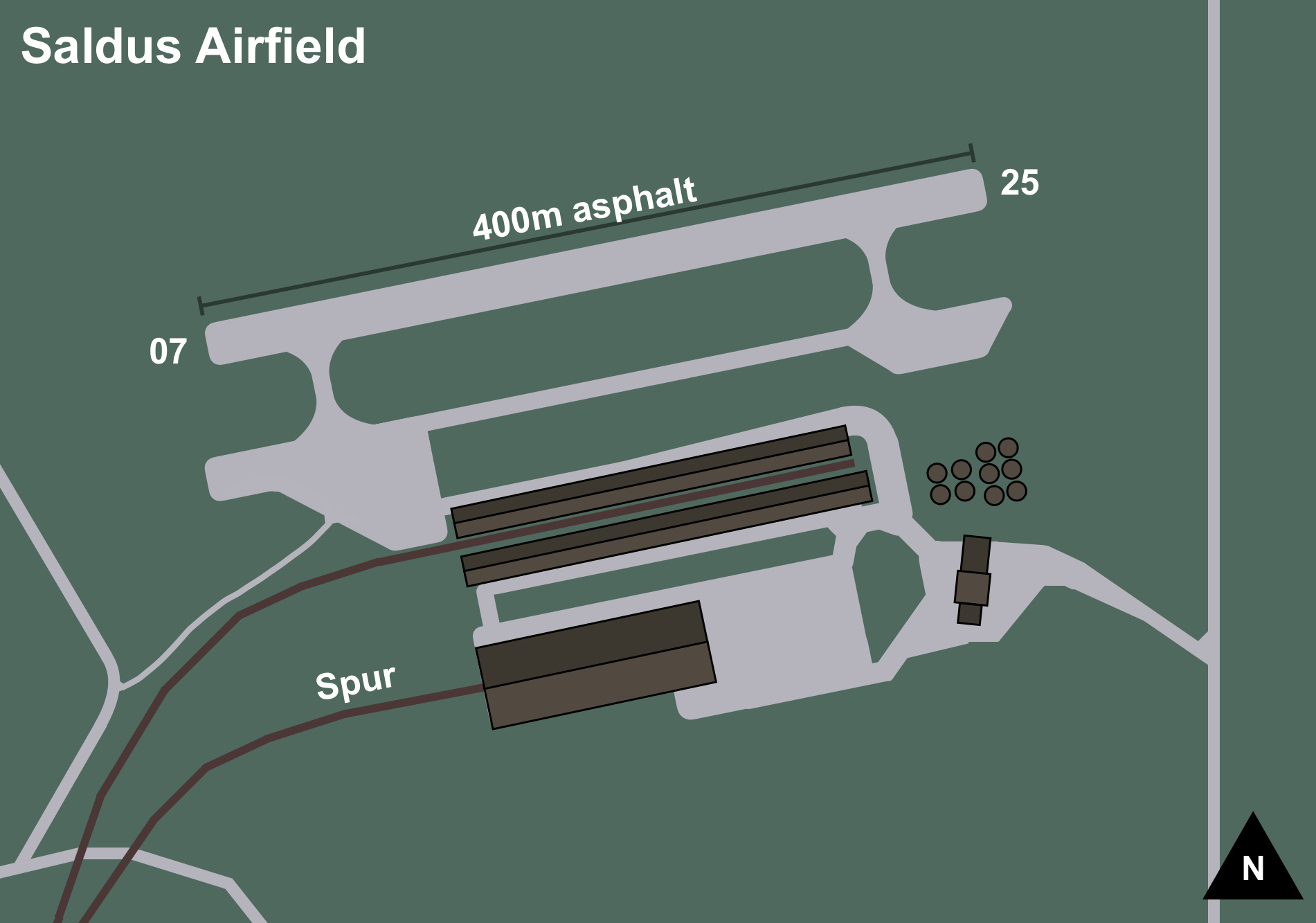
- Layout of Saldus Airfield
- IATA: none; ICAO: none

Summary
- Airport type: Defunct
- Location: Saldus Municipality
- Opened: 1972
- Closed: 1990s
- Coordinates: 56°41′32″N 22°28′13″E

Map
- Shown within Latvia

Runways
Direction	Length		Surface
Direction	ft	m	Surface
07/25	1,312	400	Asphalt

Saldus Airfield, also known as Druva Airfield, was an agricultural airfield located in Ziedonis, Saldus Municipality, Latvia. It was built in 1972 by the Soviet Union for agricultural aviation.

== History ==
In April 1942, a seaplane anchorage known as Saldus-See was listed on a directory, with no mention of a landing ground. The original Saldus Airfield, also known as Frauenburg Airfield, was prepared in October 1944 by the Germans located west of Saldus. The airfield operated a grass landing ground, and was equipped with a small hangar and a few huts. Luftwaffe units began arriving by the same month, and Frauenburg Airfield began flying ground-attack support and night operations. Three support elements were stationed, which consisted of an air reporting and observation unit, motorized anti-aircraft regiment, and a platoon of Austrian-based reserved troops were stationed.

On 19 November 1944, a heavy Soviet air raid rendered multiple hits on the taxiing area. On 22 November 1944, 5 night harassment sorties were deployed against Frauenburg Airfield, which rendered no damage. On 23 November 1944, nine Petlyakov Pe-2s bombed the airfield, which rendered no damages. On 15 December 1944, a heavy bombing raid was launched against Skrunda Airfield and Frauenburg Airfield, hitting taxiing areas and rendering both temporarily closed. On 20–21 December 1944, 31 aircraft attacked the airfield, damaging 10 aircraft. By 22 December 1944, heavy fighting occurred around Pampāļi Parish, located just 22 km southwest of Saldus. Due to the proximity of the fighting, the airfield was abandoned as it was unviable as a base where Luftwaffe units could be stationed.

=== Post-war ===
Initially, kolkhoz Druva was not served by any agricultural airfield, which acted as an inconvenience for the farm, especially in spring. Subsequently, in July 1971, the LLT district office began the planning of a new airfield to service the farms. A site was selected near the Saldus Station, next to the mineral fertilizer warehouses, with the land provided both by the nearby kolkhoz Druva and the grain product combine. This was considered convenient as it provided direct aircraft access to the mineral fertilizer warehouses. In February 1972, groundbreaking works of Saldus Airfield began in its present location north of Saldus. Further construction included a 400 m long and 20 m wide asphalt runway, equipped with a taxiway and an apron on the east and west ends. The runway was slightly humped, with the midpoint of the runway being approximately 6 feet higher than the endpoints. After Saldus Airfield opened, it was used by Antonov An-2 aircraft, and was operated by the kolkhoz Druva, which consolidated surrounding lands under Soviet agricultural policy. Aircraft operating from the airfield were used to top-dress crops, which were "fast, inexpensive and effective" to the farmers. By May 1972, Saldus Airfield was highly active, with the Druva kolkhoz and Remte sovkhoz relying on the airfield for fertilizing winter crops. Regularly, two trucks would deliver fertilizer loads, with four workers continuously transferring carbamide into the airfield's filling bunker, one worker stating that "We are working so hard there’s no time even to smoke." Remte sovkhoz also assisted other farms by installing a self-made loading machine for aircraft fertilizer hoppers in the airfield.

After Latvia gained independence in 1991, agricultural aviation declined, and the kolkhoz was reorganized into Saldus Druva, SIA on 23 February 1994. This led to the abandonment of Saldus Airfield. The Ministry of Transport also saw that it was unnecessary to maintain the airfield due to financial costs. By 1994, about 63 small agricultural airfields, including Saldus, were disused and left to degrade.

== Present ==
By 2011, the runway surface was reported as being rough, asphalt pitting and debris such as small stones. Other debris included pieces of broken glass located approximately 50m on the centerline from threshold 25. The condition of the airfield only made it viable for emergency landings. In 2017, Saldus Airfield was prepared for the Saldus aviation festival. Repairs were made, which included patching damaged asphalt with gravel.

The nearby Saldus Druva farm currently manages 1,600 - 1,800 hectares of agricultural land, and a modern dairy cow barn was built in 2019. It can hold up to 540 cows, and is equipped with an automated milking system. By 2019, the runway was in poor condition, with multiple potholes forming in the runway. In 2020, the runway surface was reported to be in bad condition with asphalt damage and debris like small stones.

Saldus Airfield is currently owned by Saldus City Council. Its economic activity is presently irregular as it is used for hosting aviation festivals. During emergent situations, the airfield may be used for transporting cargo and people by helicopters and small aircraft. Saldus Airfield is located within land parcel 10.6246 ha, and is listed as a civil engineering structure. It is largely undeveloped, and has no future aviation usage planned. It is designated as Technical Construction Territory, with potential new streets and municipal roads planned for development.

== Units ==
The following lists the units that were based in Frauenburg Airfield:

Luftwaffe

- Stab/1., 2. Staffel Nachtschlachtgruppe 5, October 1944 - December 1944
- 3rd Gruppe, Schlachtgeschwader 3, October 1944 - November 1944
- Elements of I. Gruppe, Jagdgeschwader 54, December 1944
- 1. Staffel, Nachtschlachtgruppe 3, December 1944

Support Units

- Stab, Flak-Regiment 6 (motorized), October 1944
- Flugmeldemesszug 19 (motorized) zur besonderen Verwendung, 1945
- Landesschützenzug der Luftwaffe 124/XVII, March 1945

== Accident & incidents ==
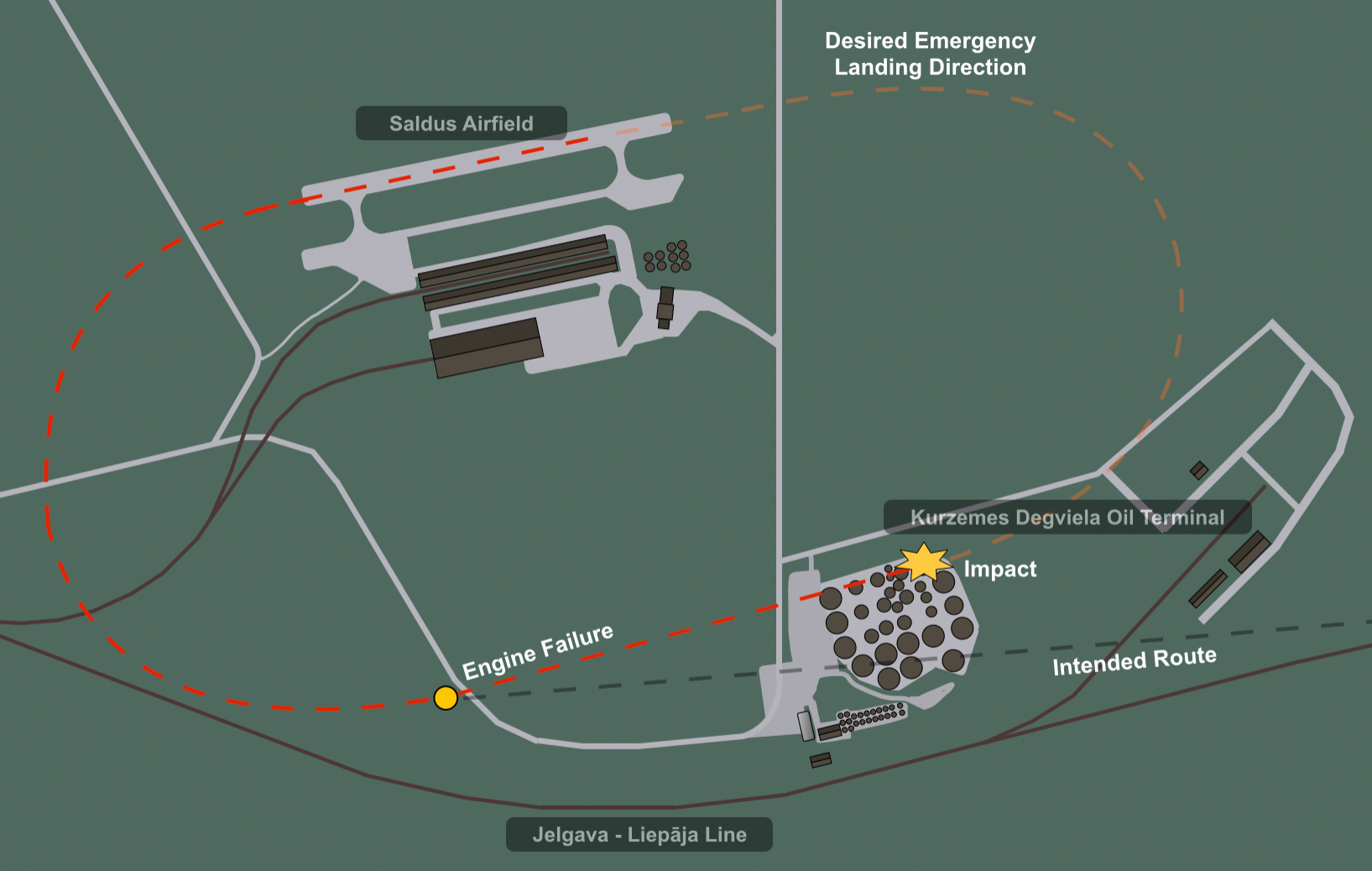
Diagram of the Antonov An-2 crash that took place from Saldus Airfield, 1981.

- On 13 June 1981, an Antonov-2 took off from Saldus Airfield instead of Skrunda Airfield to save time, without permission. An engine failure occurred around 60m altitude during takeoff, and an attempt was made to turn 90° back to the airfield, as it was thought as being safer rather than landing straight ahead near the railway. Subsequently, the aircraft crashed into a fuel depot, catching fire and killing both crew members. Due to the extent of aircraft damage, investigators were unable to determine the definite cause of crash.

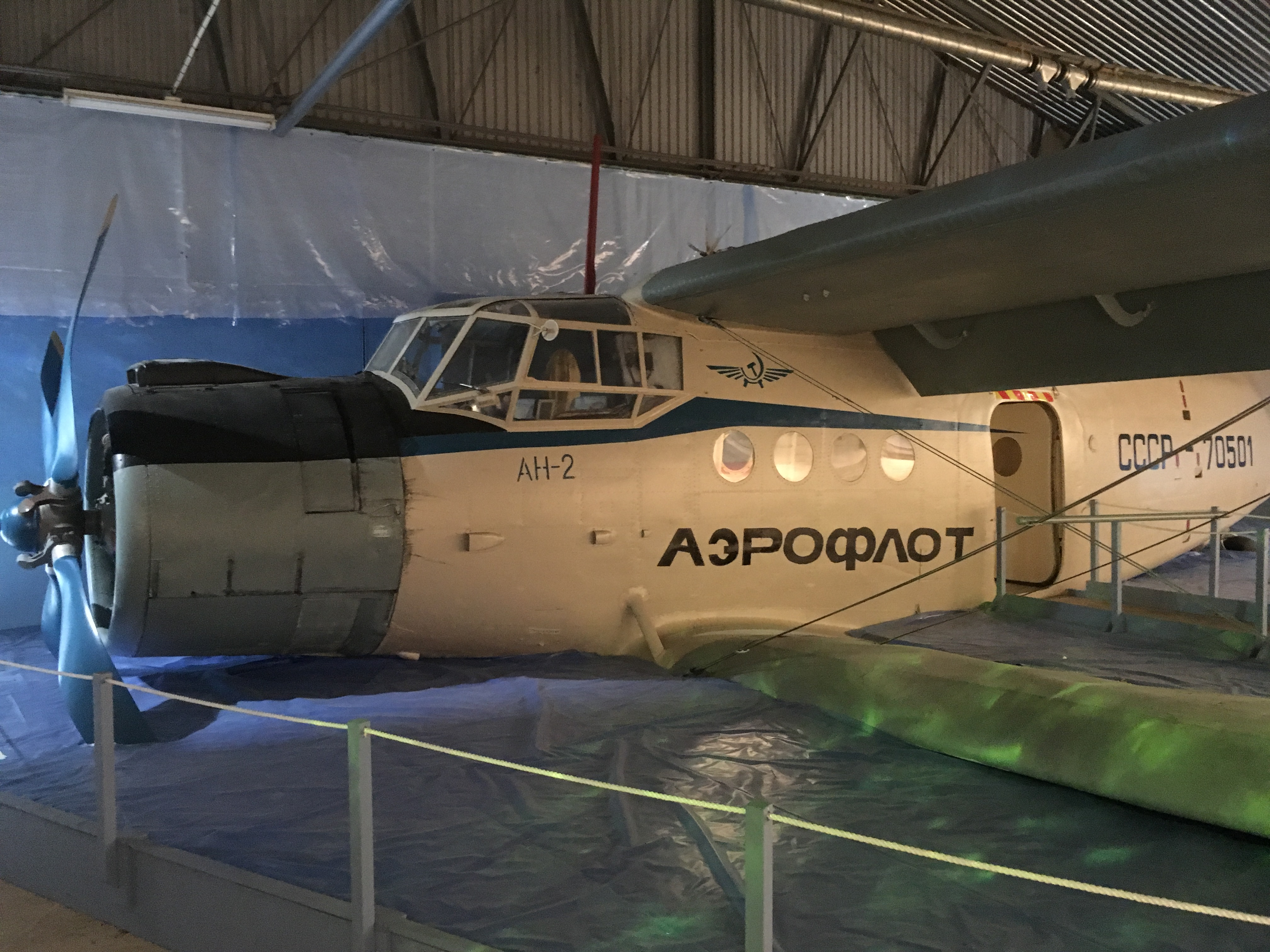
The aircraft that Romāns used is now displayed in Gotland's Defence Museum.

- In May 1987, Romāns Svistunovs carried out an escape from the Soviet Union using an aircraft stolen from Saldus Airfield. Romāns and his friend, who was a security guard at the airfield, were drinking together on the night of 26 May 1987. When the guard became drunk, Romāns said he needed to "inspect the aircraft." He went to the Antonov An-2R, started the engine, and prepared to take off. The guard came out with a pistol, aiming, but did not fire because Romāns was his friend. At 05:10, he took off from Saldus Airfield and flew straight to the Baltic Sea, flying 350 km and 2 hours at an extremely low attitude to avoid radar. However, Swedish radar detected the aircraft heading towards Gotland, and two fighter jets from Blekinge Wing in Ronneby Airport were scrambled. By the time they arrived, the An-2 had already experienced engine failure from fuel exhaustion and was ditched in the sea 100 meters from Gotland's east coast. After ditching, Romāns swam to shore, broke into a house and stole dry clothing. Eventually, he was detained by helicopter pilot Lars Flemström who was called, and requested political asylum claiming that he had fled the USSR.
- On 28 December 2014, a private aircraft with registration number YL-XIN had taken off from the airfield and was being used as an experimental aircraft, built in Estonia by a private individual from whom the pilot had purchased it. The aircraft was equipped with a Subaru car engine, and shortly after takeoff, the aircraft experienced engine failure and crashed. The pilot was killed in the crash.

== See also ==
- Skrunda Airfield
- Priekule Airfield
- Agriculture in the Soviet Union
