= Alūksne Municipality =

Municipality of Latvia

Alūksne Municipality Alūksnes novads
- Municipality
- Flag Coat of arms

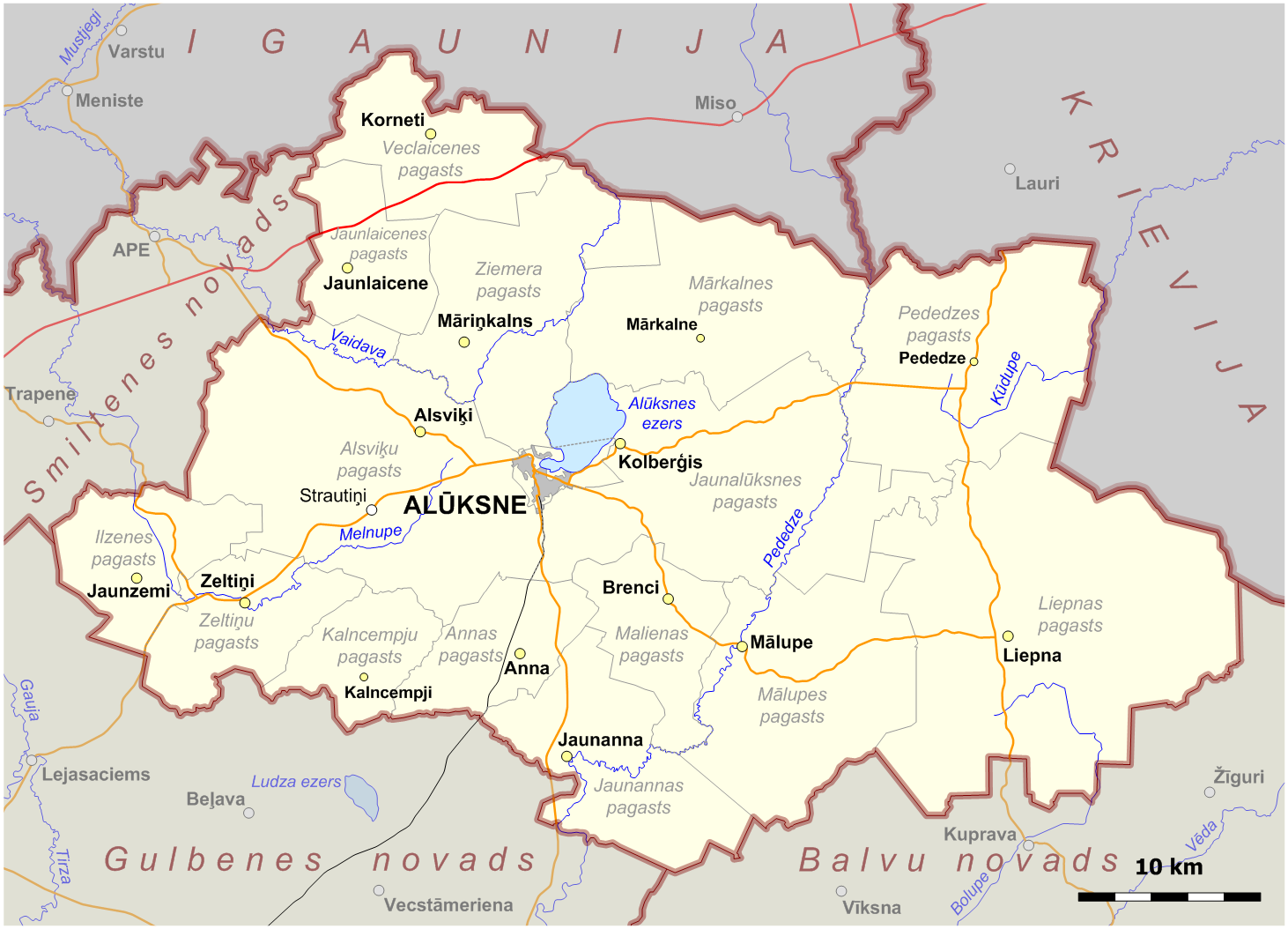
- Country: Latvia
- Formed: 1 July 2009
- Centre: Alūksne

Government
  - Council Chair: Dzintars Adlers (Vienotība)

Area
  - Total: 1,697.57 km^{2} (655.44 sq mi)
  - Land: 1,633.81 km^{2} (630.82 sq mi)
  - Water: 63.76 km^{2} (24.62 sq mi)

Population (2026)
  - Total: 12,894
  - Density: 7.8920/km^{2} (20.440/sq mi)
- Website: www.aluksne.lv

Alūksne Municipality (Latvian: Alūksnes novads) is a municipality in Vidzeme, Latvia. It is located in the northeast of the country and borders Ape in the west, Balvi Municipality and Gulbene Municipality in the south, Pskov Oblast of Russia in the east and Võru County of Estonia in the north. The administrative center of the municipality is Alūksne.

== History ==
The municipality was formed in 2009 by merging Alsviķi parish, Anna parish, Ilzene parish, Jaunalūksne parish, Jaunanna parish, Jaunlaicene parish, Kalncempji parish, Liepna parish, Maliena parish, Mālupe parish, Mārkalne parish, Pededze parish, Veclaicene parish, Zeltiņi parish, Ziemeri parish, and the town of Alūksne.

== Twin towns — sister cities ==
Alūksne is twinned with:

- Strugo-Krasnensky District, Russia
- Ostrovsky District, Russia
- Pechorsky District, Russia
- Pskov, Russia
- Haanja, Estonia
- Misso, Estonia
- Rõuge, Estonia
- Vastseliina, Estonia
- Võru, Estonia
- Sundbyberg, Sweden
- Wettin-Löbejün, Germany

== See also ==
- Administrative divisions of Latvia
- Alūksne#Notable people
