= Liepna Parish =

Parish of Latvia

- parish of Latvia
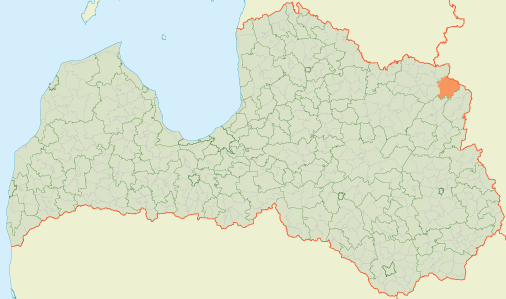
- Coordinates: 57°20′55″N 27°30′51″E
- Country: Latvia

Population (1 January 2026)
  - Total: 526

Liepna Parish (Latvian: Liepnas pagasts) is an administrative unit of Alūksne Municipality in the Latgale region of Latvia.

== Towns, villages and settlements of Liepna Parish ==
- Liepna
