= Anna Parish =

Parish of Latvia

- parish of Latvia
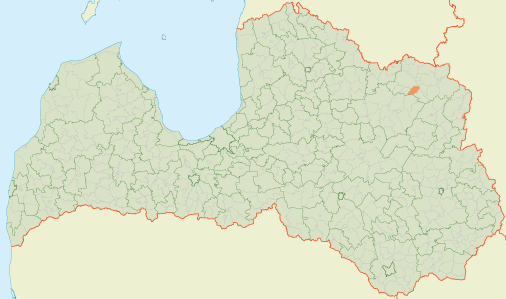
- 57°20′15″N 27°00′25″E
- Country: Latvia

Area
  - Total: 51.93 km^{2} (20.05 sq mi)
  - Land: 51.93 km^{2} (20.05 sq mi)
  - Water: 0.65 km^{2} (0.25 sq mi)

Population (1 January 2024)
  - Total: 353
  - Density: 6.8/km^{2} (18/sq mi)

Anna Parish (Latvian: Annas pagasts) is an administrative unit of Alūksne Municipality, Latvia.
