= Kalncempji Parish =

Parish of Latvia

- parish of Latvia
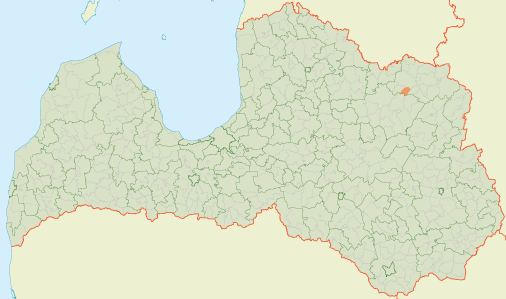
- 57°20′03″N 26°52′53″E
- Country: Latvia

Area
  - Total: 42.91 km^{2} (16.57 sq mi)
  - Land: 42.06 km^{2} (16.24 sq mi)
  - Water: 0.85 km^{2} (0.33 sq mi)

Population (1 January 2026)
  - Total: 152
  - Density: 3.61/km^{2} (9.36/sq mi)

Kalncempji Parish (Latvian: Kalncempju pagasts) is an administrative unit of Alūksne Municipality, Latvia.
