= Alsviķi Parish =

Parish of Latvia

- parish of Latvia
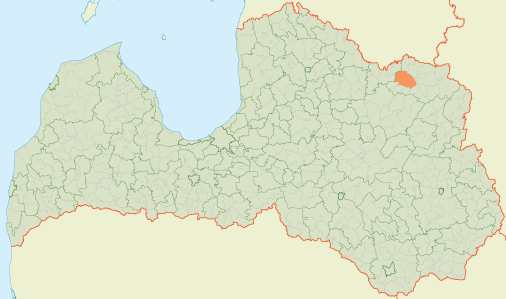
- 57°25′42″N 26°52′58″E
- Country: Latvia

Area
  - Total: 212.92 km^{2} (82.21 sq mi)
  - Land: 206.27 km^{2} (79.64 sq mi)
  - Water: 6.65 km^{2} (2.57 sq mi)

Population (1 January 2026)
  - Total: 1,107
  - Density: 5.367/km^{2} (13.90/sq mi)

Alsviķi Parish (Latvian: Alsviķu pagasts) is an administrative unit of Alūksne Municipality, Latvia. The administrative center of the parish is Alsviķi.

== Towns, villages and settlements of Alsviķi parish ==
- Alsviķi (parish center)
- Strautiņi
- Aizupītes
- Karva
- Rezaka
- Nēķene
- Cerkazi
- Silaktis
- Tūja
