= Priekule Airfield =

Former airport in Priekule, Latvia

Priekule Airfield Priekules Lidlauks
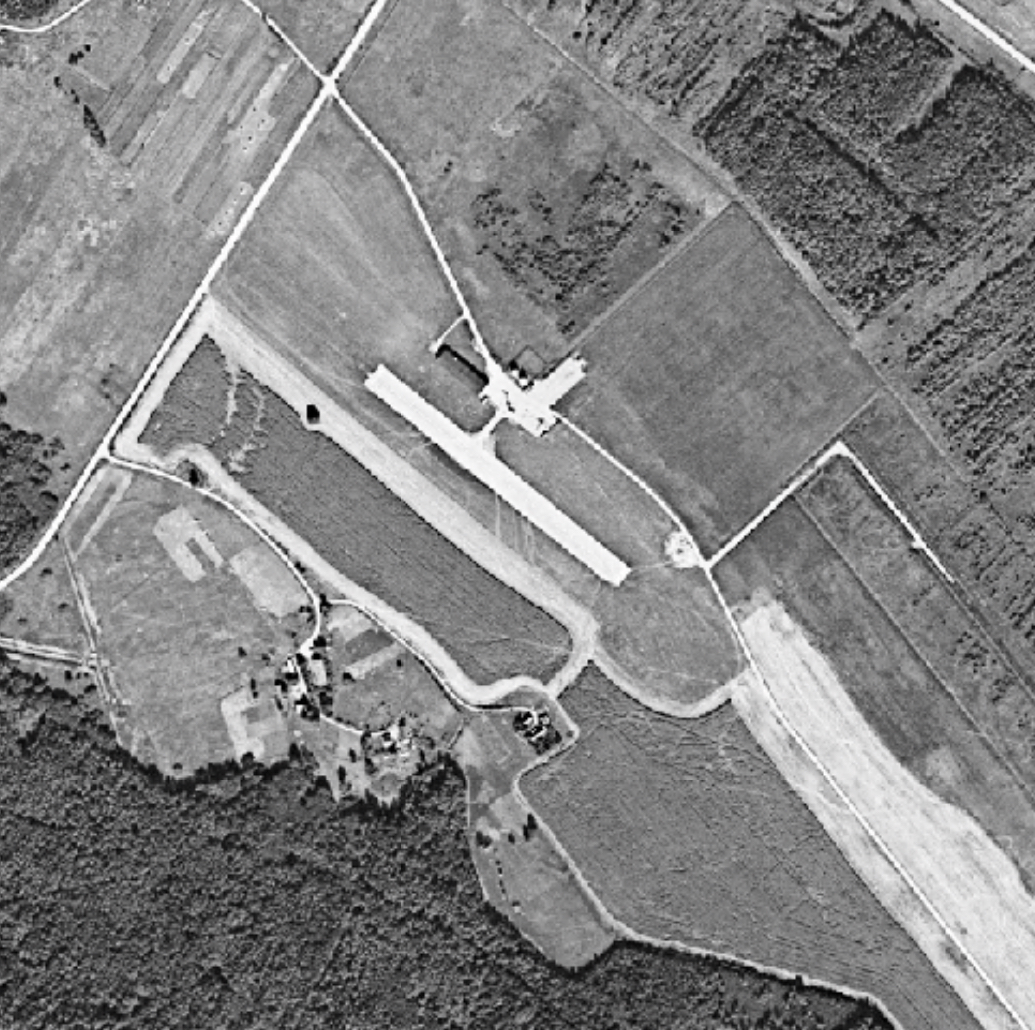
- Satellite imagery of Priekule Airfield captured by KH-9 on 7 September 1984.
- IATA: none; ICAO: none

Summary
- Airport type: Defunct
- Operator: Formerly Aeroflot
- Location: Priekule
- Opened: 1971
- Built: October 1939
- Coordinates: 56°25′44″N 21°34′47″E
- Interactive map of Priekule Airfield

Runways
Direction	Length		Surface
Direction	ft	m	Surface
12/30	1,312.34	400	Asphalt

Priekule Airfield is an abandoned airport located in Priekule, Latvia. It was originally built in October 1939, and then was rebuilt in 1971 for agricultural aviation. The runway is mainly used for motorsports activities.

== History ==
In October 1939, the Soviet Armed Forces began construction of Priekule Airfield in accordance to the Mutual Assistance Pact between Latvia and the USSR. In summer 1944, Priekule Airfield was occupied and upgraded by the Germans likely intended for Luftwaffe usage, however no units were ever based there. When the German forces withdrew, the airfield was abandoned.

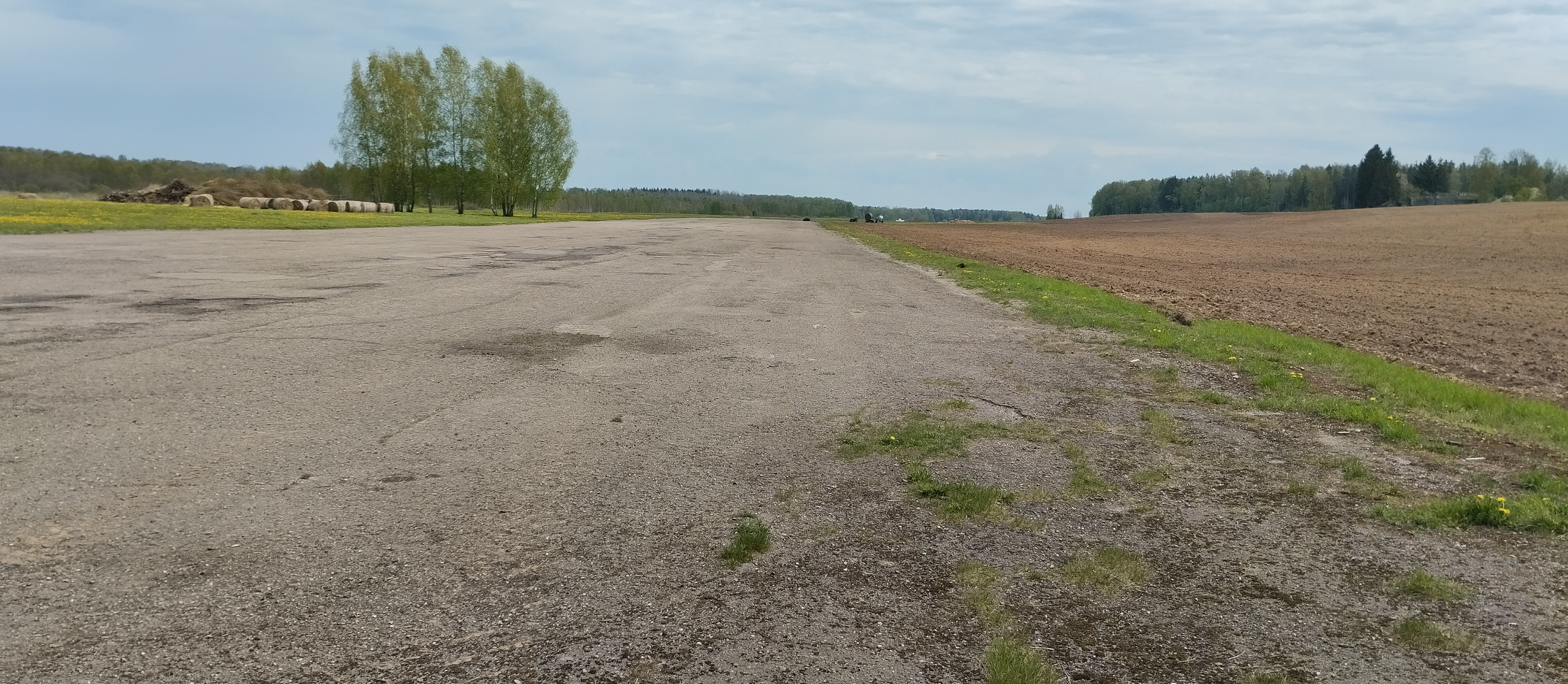
The old runway of the airfield remains intact.

=== Post-war ===
In summer 1971, Priekule Airfield was opened for use by Priekule sovkhoz. During construction, two excavators destroyed wartime pits. The director Augusts Pommers planned a commemorative stone at the airfield listing the names of workers who were previously involved in the ploughing of the land. As the area of land under land improvement in the region increased by 1972, the demand of mineral fertilizer sowing significantly increased. Agricultural airfields including Priekule, Aizpute, and Cīrava were all organized to meet the demands under an effort by the Lauktehnika association. Inter-farm storage facilities were also built near Priekule Airfield.

According to a local resident, Antonov An-2 aircraft was used for crop-dusting and fertilizer spreading, and would be stored in the airfield's hangar. It consisted of a 30 meter wide asphalt runway and taxiway which led to a large apron. After Latvia gained independence in 1991, agricultural aviation declined, leading to the abandonment of Priekule Airfield. The Ministry of Transport also saw that it was unnecessary to maintain the airfield due to financial costs. By 1994, about 63 small agricultural airfields, including Priekule, were disused and left to degrade.

== Present ==
In 2010, the Rally Kurzeme held a rally sprint finishing at the Priekule Airfield service zone. In 2011, the airfield's runway was in good condition, however, small holes were observed on the southeast end of the runway. Currently, the airfield is closed to all aviation despite good runway conditions. On July 26, 2025, BalticShows held a motor event for its Grand Five-Year Finale in the runway. Activities included racing and burnouts on the asphalt runway.

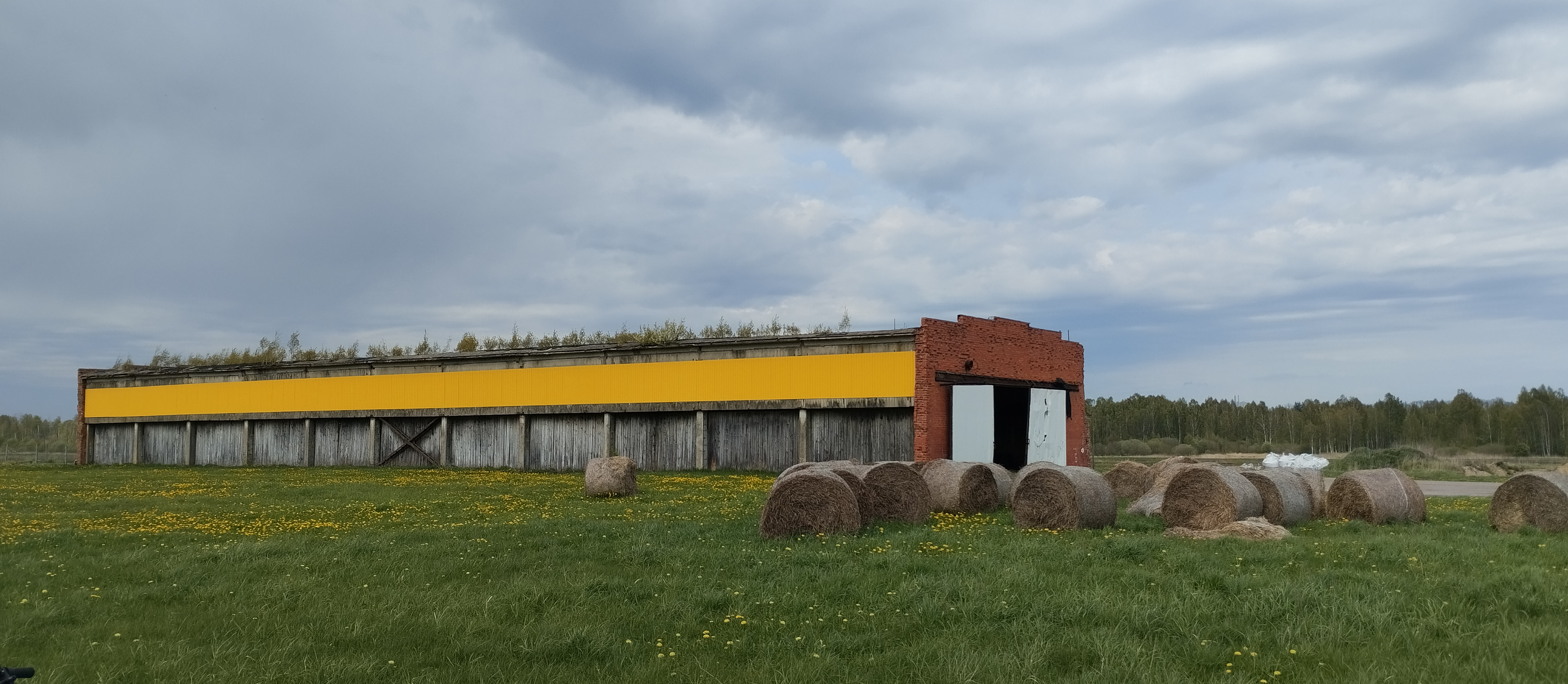
Derelict hangar of Priekule Airfield.

=== Facilities ===
Priekule Airfield consists of a 400 meter long and 30 meter wide asphalt runway. It is located 2 km SW of the Priekule town. In 2013, it was described as having an easy approach to runway 30. There is an electricity line 450m from the threshold of runway 12, which posed as a risk for pilots. Other obstacles include trees intruding to the side of the mid-point of the runway, with a small 50 cm high fence on both ends of the runway. Located on the apron is an old hangar with a footprint of approximately 1,305 m^{2}, which is currently used as a cattle barn.

== See also ==
- Saldus Airfield
- Skrunda Airfield
- Agriculture in the Soviet Union

== Notes ==
1. In the airfield hangar, there is a cattle barn. A resident of Priekule says that the hangar once housed “kukuruzņiki” (Antonov An-2 aircraft), which were used to spread fertilizers for the needs of kolkhozes or sovkhozes.
