= Skrunda Airfield =

Former airport in Skrunda, Latvia

Skrunda Airfield Skrunda Lidlauks
- IATA: none; ICAO: none

Summary
- Airport type: Defunct
- Operator: Formerly Aeroflot
- Location: Skrunda, Kuldīga Municipality
- Opened: 1979
- Closed: 1990s
- Built: 1930s
- Coordinates: 56°41′00″N 21°59′53″E
- Interactive map of Skrunda Airfield

Runways
Direction	Length		Surface
Direction	ft	m	Surface
16/24	656.16	200	Asphalt

Skrunda Airfield, also known as Schrunden Airfield, was an agricultural aviation airfield located in Skrunda in Kuldīga Municipality, Latvia. It was originally built in the 1930s, and then was rebuilt in 1979 for agricultural aviation.

== History ==
In the 1930s, Skrunda Airfield mainly operated as a venue for aviation events, known at the time as Skrunda Aerodrome. On 26 July, 1936, an aviation festival was held at Skrunda Airfield. On 18 July, 1937, another aviation performance was held in the airfield. On 24 July, 1938, the last aviation festival was held, and the airfield fell into disuse. Following capture by the German Army in July 1941, the airfield was reactivated by the Luftwaffe in October 1944. It was known as Schrunden Airfield, and consisted of a natural surface landing ground measuring 350 x 150 meters. From October 1944 until December 1944, it was utilized as a command base for fighter and night attack operations. After December 1944, Skrunda Airfield was abandoned by the Germans.

=== Post-war ===
In July 1979, Skrunda Airfield was opened as part of the region's agricultural modernization program. Immediately following opening, the airfield was used in summer of 1979 tor fighting potato blight. In spring of 1980, the airfield was used to spread mineral fertilizers with Antonov An-2 aircraft. A 400 meter long asphalt runway was built, accompanied by a taxiway leading to a medium-sized apron on the southern side. The airfield mainly served Antonov An-2 flights, however it was seen as being less profitable to load mineral fertilizers for sprinkling there, and flights would usually be rearranged to Saldus Airfield. After Latvia gained independence in 1991, agricultural aviation declined, leading to the abandonment of Skrunda Airfield. The Ministry of Transport also saw that it was unnecessary to maintain the airfield due to financial costs. By 1994, about 63 small agricultural airfields, including Skrunda, were disused and left to degrade.

Today, Skrunda Airfield remains under private ownership, however its current operational status is unknown. Due to the airfield’s derelict state, trees and overgrowth have appeared 200 meters on the southwestern side from the runway. There is also overgrowth such as bush and small trees on both ends of the runway, while patches of soil and grass have covered a portion of the northeastern side. The former airfield is part of a scenic trekking route.

== Units ==
The following lists the German units that were based in Skrunda Airfield:

- Stab and 1st Squadron of Nachtschlachtgeschwader 3 (Night Ground Attack Wing 3), October 1944 – December 1944
- Stab and I. Gruppe of Jagdgeschwader 54 (Fighter Wing 54), October 1944 – December 1944
- Stab of 3. Fliegerdivision (3rd Air Division), October 1944
- 135. Flugplatzbetriebskompanie (Qu), November 1944

== Accidents & incidents ==
- On 27 December, 1944, 117 victories Luftwaffe ace Lt Heinz Wernicke was killed in an aerial mid-air collision with his wingman in a Fw 190 A, crashing near their home base of Skrunda.
- On 13 June, 1981, an Antonov-2 took off from Saldus Airfield instead of Skrunda Airfield to save time, without permission. An engine failure occurred around 60m altitude during takeoff, and an attempt was made to turn 90° back to the airfield, as it was thought as being safer rather than landing straight ahead near the railway. Subsequently, the aircraft crashed into a fuel depot, catching fire, killing both crew members.

== See also ==
- Saldus Airfield
- Priekule Airfield
- Agriculture in the Soviet Union
