= Mārkalne Parish =

Parish of Latvia

- parish of Latvia
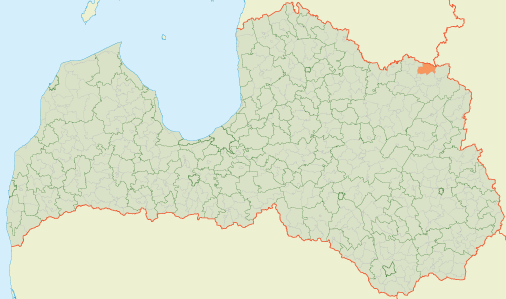
- 57°30′22″N 27°12′36″E
- Country: Latvia

Area
  - Total: 123.87 km^{2} (47.83 sq mi)
  - Land: 121.56 km^{2} (46.93 sq mi)
  - Water: 2.31 km^{2} (0.89 sq mi)

Population (1 January 2024)
  - Total: 287
  - Density: 2.3/km^{2} (6.0/sq mi)

Mārkalne Parish (Latvian: Mārkalnes pagasts) is an administrative unit of Alūksne Municipality, Latvia. The population is 510.
