= Maliena Parish =

Parish of Latvia

- parish of Latvia
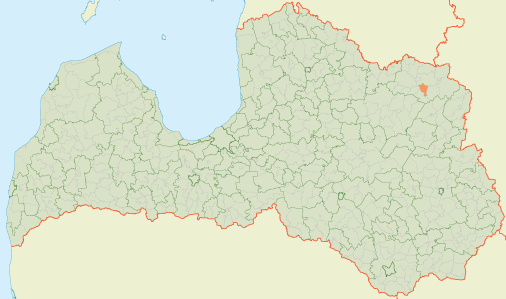
- 57°20′41″N 27°09′17″E

- Location within Latvia
- Country: Latvia

Area
  - Total: 55.38 km^{2} (21.38 sq mi)
  - Land: 53.67 km^{2} (20.72 sq mi)
  - Water: 1.71 km^{2} (0.66 sq mi)

Population (1 January 2026)
  - Total: 310
  - Density: 5.8/km^{2} (15/sq mi)

Maliena Parish (Latvian: Malienas pagasts) is an administrative unit of Alūksne Municipality, Latvia.
