= Pededze Parish =

Parish of Latvia

- parish of Latvia
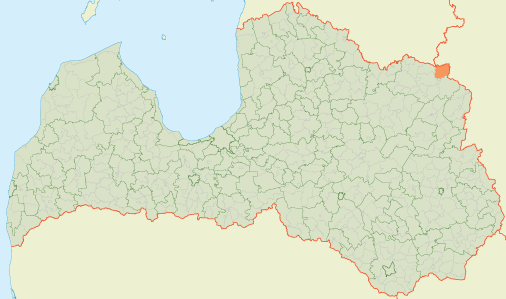
- Coordinates: 57°28′55″N 27°26′44″E
- Country: Latvia

Population (1 January 2026)
  - Total: 465

Pededze Parish (Latvian: Pededzes pagasts) is an administrative unit of Alūksne Municipality, Latvia. It contains the tri-border between Estonia, Latvia and Russia

== Towns, villages and settlements of Pededze Parish ==
- Pededze
- Zaiceva
- Ķurši
