= Jaunanna Parish =

Parish of Latvia

- parish of Latvia
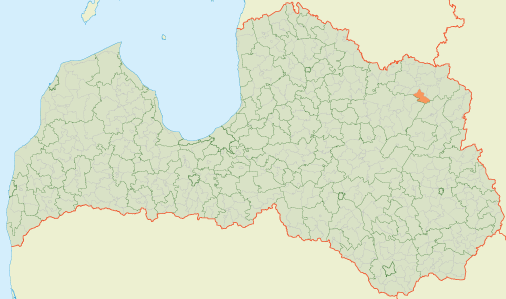
- 57°16′47″N 27°07′05″E
- Country: Latvia

Area
  - Total: 93.94 km^{2} (36.27 sq mi)
  - Land: 90.94 km^{2} (35.11 sq mi)
  - Water: 3 km^{2} (1.2 sq mi)

Population (1 January 2026)
  - Total: 403
  - Density: 4.43/km^{2} (11.5/sq mi)

Jaunanna Parish (Latvian: Jaunannas pagasts) is an administrative unit of Alūksne Municipality, Latvia.
