= Ilzene Parish =

Parish of Latvia

- parish of Latvia
- Coat of arms

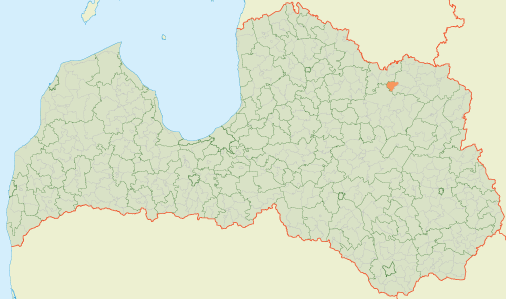
- 57°23′02″N 26°40′45″E
- Country: Latvia

Area
  - Total: 62.46 km^{2} (24.12 sq mi)
  - Land: 61.33 km^{2} (23.68 sq mi)
  - Water: 1.13 km^{2} (0.44 sq mi)

Population (1 January 2024)
  - Total: 247
  - Density: 4.0/km^{2} (10/sq mi)

Ilzene Parish (Latvian: Ilzenes pagasts) is an administrative unit of Alūksne Municipality, Latvia.
