= Jaunlaicene Parish =

Parish of Latvia

- parish of Latvia
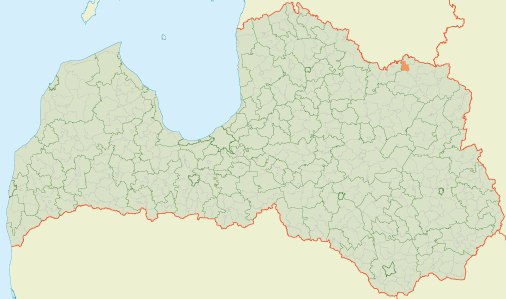
- 57°32′00″N 26°53′07″E
- Country: Latvia

Area
  - Total: 52.20 km^{2} (20.15 sq mi)
  - Land: 50.68 km^{2} (19.57 sq mi)
  - Water: 1.52 km^{2} (0.59 sq mi)

Population (1 January 2024)
  - Total: 370
  - Density: 7.1/km^{2} (18/sq mi)

Jaunlaicene Parish (Latvian: Jaunlaicenes pagasts) is an administrative unit of Alūksne Municipality, Latvia.
