= Jaunalūksne Parish =

Parish of Latvia

- parish of Latvia
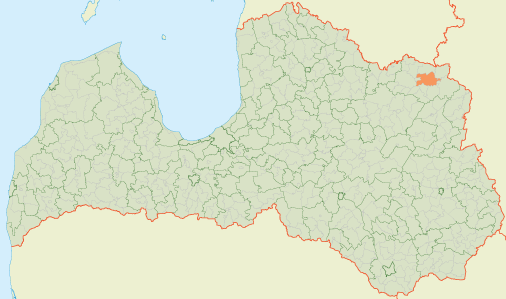
- 57°25′17″N 27°13′04″E
- Country: Latvia

Area
  - Total: 183.89 km^{2} (71.00 sq mi)
  - Land: 167.07 km^{2} (64.51 sq mi)
  - Water: 16.82 km^{2} (6.49 sq mi)

Population (1 January 2026)
  - Total: 862
  - Density: 5.16/km^{2} (13.4/sq mi)

Jaunalūksne Parish (Latvian: Jaunalūksnes pagasts) is an administrative unit of Alūksne Municipality, Latvia.
