= Zeltiņi Parish =

Parish of Latvia

- parish of Latvia
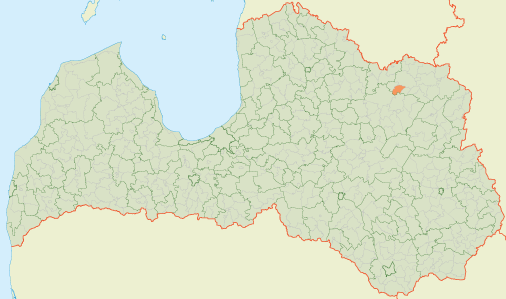
- 57°20′56″N 26°46′02″E
- Country: Latvia

Area
  - Total: 62.92 km^{2} (24.29 sq mi)
  - Land: 60.87 km^{2} (23.50 sq mi)
  - Water: 2.05 km^{2} (0.79 sq mi)

Population (1 January 2024)
  - Total: 267
  - Density: 4.2/km^{2} (11/sq mi)

Zeltiņi Parish (Latvian: Zeltiņu pagasts) is an administrative unit of Alūksne Municipality, Latvia.
