= Mālupe Parish =

Parish of Latvia

- parish of Latvia
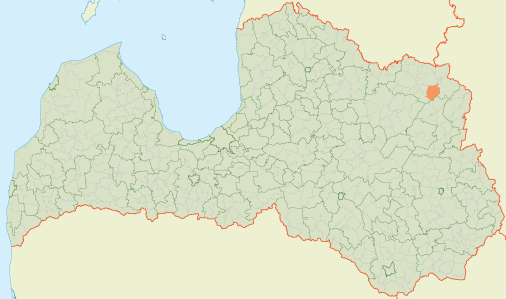
- 57°19′03″N 27°17′23″E

- Location within Latvia
- Country: Latvia

Area
  - Total: 129.38 km^{2} (49.95 sq mi)
  - Land: 124.12 km^{2} (47.92 sq mi)
  - Water: 5.26 km^{2} (2.03 sq mi)

Population (1 January 2026)
  - Total: 503
  - Density: 4.05/km^{2} (10.5/sq mi)

Mālupe Parish (Latvian: Mālupes pagasts) is an administrative unit of Alūksne Municipality, Latvia.
