= Ludza district =

District of Latvia

Coordinates: 56°33′N 27°43′E

Ludza Ludzas rajons
- District
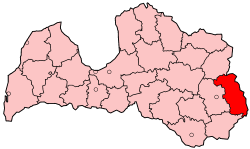
- Country: Latvia
- Established: 1949
- Dissolved: 2009
- Seat: Ludza

Area
  - Total: 2,412 km^{2} (931 sq mi)

Population
  - Total: 32,634
  - Density: 13.53/km^{2} (35.04/sq mi)
- Website: ludza.lv/

Ludza district (Latvian: Ludzas rajons) was an administrative division of Latvia, located in Latgale region, in the country's east.

Districts were eliminated during the administrative-territorial reform in 2009.

== Populated places of Ludza district ==
- Kārsava
- Ludza (district centre)
- Ņivņiki
- Zilupe

== Provinces and parishes of Ludza district ==
- Blonti parish
- Brigi parish
- Cibla municipality
- Cirma parish
- Goliševa parish
- Isnauda parish
- Istra parish
- Lauderi parish
- Malnava parish
- Mērdzene parish
- Mežvidi parish
- Nirza parish
- Ņukši parish
- Pasiene parish
- Pilda parish
- Pureņi parish
- Pušmucova parish
- Rundēni parish
- Salnava parish
- Zilupe municipality
- Zvirgzdene parish
