= Malnava =

Village in Latvia

- Village
- Location in Latvia
- Coordinates: 56°46′26″N 27°43′06″E
- Country: Latvia
- Municipality: Ludza Municipality
- Elevation: 115 m (377 ft)

Population (2021)
  - Total: 323
- Time zone: UTC+2 (EET)
  - Summer (DST): UTC+3 (EEST)
- Postal code: LV-5750

Malnava, also spelled Malnova, is a village and the parish center of the Malnava Parish of Ludza Municipality in the Latgale region of Latvia.

== Geography ==
Malnava is located in eastern Latvia next to the town of Kārsava, directly on the A13 motorway, which is part of the European route E262. The Russian border at Grebņova is around 13 kilometers away. The nearest large town is Ludza, around 30 kilometers south of the town. The Latvian capital Riga is around 276 kilometers away. The Kārsava train station in the town of Bozova is just under 6.5 kilometers away and is on the Rēzekne–Kārsava railway line.

Near Malnava is the Zīdūņs park, a natural forest with two running and hiking trails.

== History ==
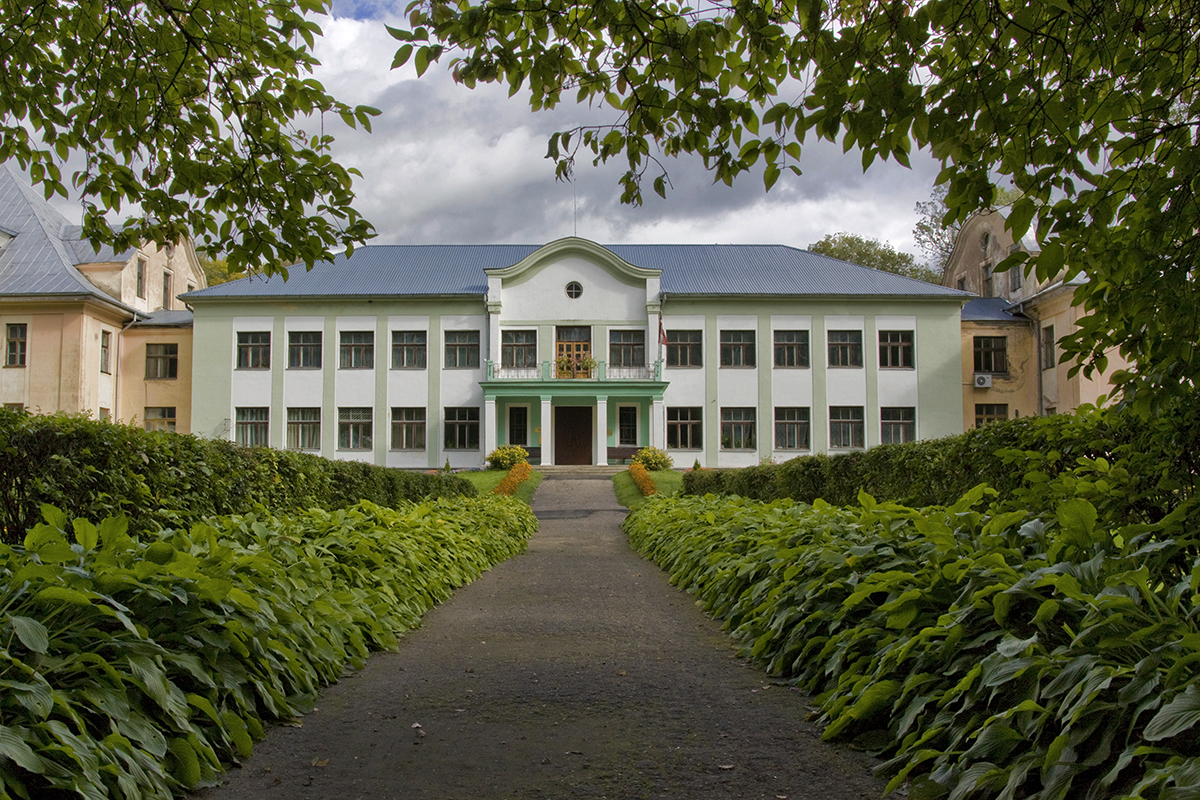
Malnov Manor

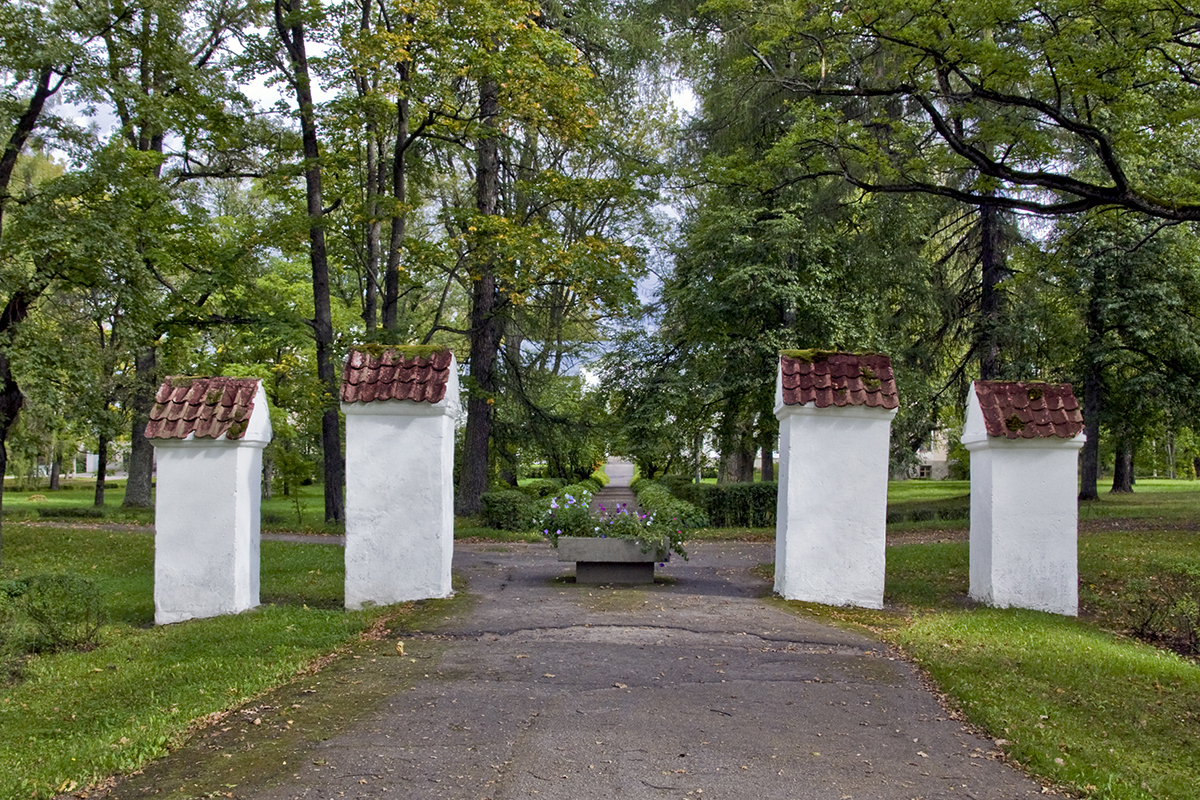
The “White Gate” to the garden of Malnov Manor

=== Malnov Manor ===
The town grew up around the Malnov manor, which originally served as a second seat of the Salnava manor. Until 1724 the estate belonged to the Hülsen family, who owned most of the estates in Latgale at the time. In 1763 a Catholic church was built on the estate. After the daughter Jadvig Hülsen married the nobleman Jan Šadurski in 1774, the estate became the property of the Šadurski family. In the 1784 census the estate had 1,793 residents. In 1842 the brothers Nikolai and Vincent Šadurski separated the dependence of the Malnow manor from the main Salnava manor. By 1920 the farm was one of the largest farms in Latvia with around 12 hectares. The important role of agriculture was one of the reasons for the founding of the agricultural school the following year. In the garden of the manor house there was the so-called "Hitler Bunker", which is now a lost place. The garden was built around 1830 and has a pond and countless trees and flowers as well as a barn.

=== Village Malnava ===
During the Soviet era, the town grew to 921 inhabitants (1979). Malnava is home to the Malnava airfield, the Malnava parish administration, a post office and a school with a kindergarten. During the Second World War, Army Group North had a headquarters in Malnava. In 1990, the Malnava district municipality was founded with surrounding villages. Until 2021, Malnava belonged to Kārsava Municipality. As a result of the administrative reform in Latvia in 2021, Malnava was incorporated into Ludza Municipality. There is also a distillery in Malnava, where, among other things, the traditional Latgalian drink Shmakovka is brewed. In addition, the town is home to the largest Shmakovka Museum in Latvia.

=== Malnava University ===
Malnava has been the seat of the Malnava College since its foundation on October 15, 1921, which at that time taught mainly agriculture under the name Latgales lauksaimniecības vidusskola (Latgale Agricultural Secondary School). In 2003, the first two recognized courses of study, "Car transport" and "Entrepreneurship in Agriculture", were introduced. Since January 1, 2022, the college has been a branch campus of the Latvian University of Agriculture based in Jelgava.

=== Hitler's visit in July 1941 ===
At a briefing with Field Marshal Wilhelm Ritter von Leeb on July 21, 1941 at the headquarters of Army Group North, Hitler was informed of the current status of the attack on the Soviet Union. Hitler landed at Malnava airfield at around 6:15 a.m., accompanied by Army officer Wilhelm Keitel. Although a visit to Army Group Center would have been more obvious due to the ongoing air raids on Moscow, Hitler's actual goal was to take over the region around the Donbas because of its industrial and agricultural importance. During the visit to Malnava, Hitler expressed his "extreme dissatisfaction" with the actions of the Army Group and told the Field Marshal, they had "done everything wrong".
