= Kārsava Municipality =

Municipality of Latvia

Coordinates: 56°47′02″N 27°41′05″E

Kārsava Municipality Kārsavas novads
- Municipality
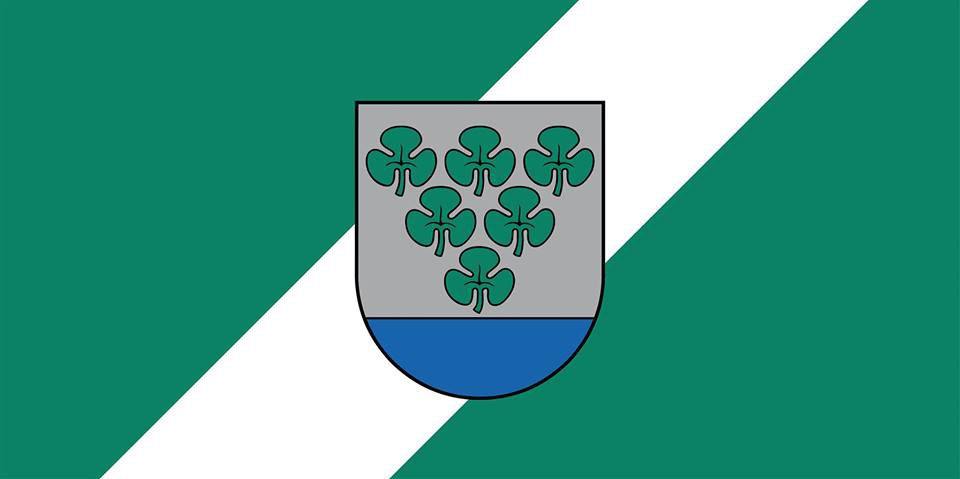
- Flag Coat of arms

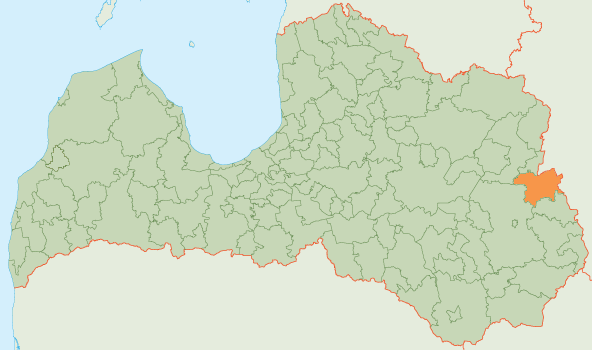
- Country: Latvia
- Formed: 2009
- Dissolved: 2021
- Centre: Kārsava

Government
  - Chairwoman: Ināra Silicka (LZP)

Area
  - Total: 627.98 km^{2} (242.46 sq mi)
  - Land: 617.63 km^{2} (238.47 sq mi)
  - Water: 10.35 km^{2} (4.00 sq mi)

Population (2021)
  - Total: 5,127
  - Density: 8.301/km^{2} (21.50/sq mi)
- Website: www.karsava.lv

Kārsava Municipality (Latvian: Kārsavas novads, Latgalian: Kuorsovys nūvods) is a former municipality in Latgale, Latvia. The municipality was formed in 2009 by merging Goliševa Parish, Malnava Parish, Mērdzene Parish, Mežvidi Parish, Salnava Parish and Kārsava town of the former Ludza district. The administrative centre was Kārsava.

On 1 July 2021, Kārsava Municipality ceased to exist and its territory was merged into Ludza Municipality.

== See also ==
- Administrative divisions of Latvia (2009)
