= Emmanuel Leão =

Emmanuel Carneiro Leão (5 October 1929 – 7 October 2023) was a Brazilian philosopher and professor. Alongside Vicente Ferreira da Silva, Gerd Bornheim, and Ernildo Stein, he is considered one of Brazil's principal Heidegger scholars.

== Academic career ==
As an ordered franciscan priest, he studied philosophy at the Pontifical University of Saint Anthony, and later earned his master's degree and doctorate from the University of Freiburg, where he studied under Martin Heidegger.

Having returned to Brazil, he wrote on a wide array of subjects, such as the philosophy of science, mythology, theology, aesthetics, and education. He was one of the founding members of the Brazilian Academy of Philosophy, taught at the Federal University of Rio de Janeiro, where he helped found the School of Communication, and collaborated with the Revista Brasileira de Filosofia, the journal published by the Brazilian Institute of Philosophy.
