= Istra rolling hills =

Nature park in Latvia

Istra Hillock Nature Park
- Istras pauguraine
- IUCN category II (national park)
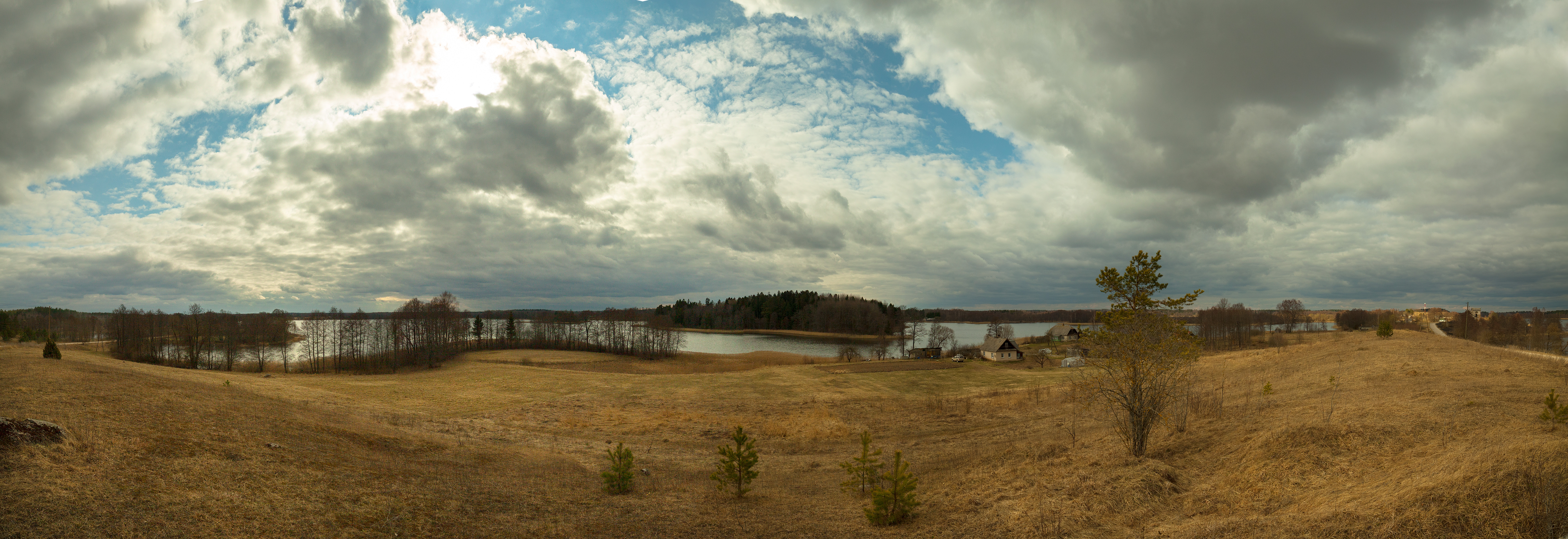

- Location within Latvia
- Location: Latvia, Latgale, Ludza Municipality
- Nearest city: Ludza
- Coordinates: 56°16′12″N 28°02′35″E
- Area: 8.67 km^{2} (3.35 sq mi)
- Established: 1977

Istra rolling hills (Latvian: Istras pauguraine) is nature park (landscape protection area) in Istra Parish, Ludza Municipality, Latgale, Latvia. It is located between Lake Šķaune and Lake Maroksna in Latgale Upland and Rāznava hills.

This conservation area was first established in 1977 and measured only 340 ha at that time. It was created to protect the more forested part of the landscape with articulated terrain, pines, spruces and broad-leaved forests, a significant part of which are excessively moist European alder forests. Now the protected area extends to the eastern shores of Lake Škaune.

Within the landscape protection area there is an ancient Pavlovas burial ground (56.281720067971°N 28.088526589616°E) near the almost abandoned village Pavlova. is also under protection.

Today, protected area is 866 ha. This is also the Natura 2000 area.

== Flora ==
There are two protected plant species — hairy agrimony (Agrimonia pilosa) and cutleaf anemone (Pulsatilla patens).

== Fauna ==
There are 16 protected species of birds — lesser spotted eagle (Aquila pomarina), hazel grouse (Bonasa bonasia), black tern (Chlidonias niger), white stork (Ciconia ciconia), black stork (Ciconia nigra), marsh harrier (Circus aeruginosus), corncrake (Crex crex), white-backed woodpecker (Dendrocopos leucotos), black woodpecker (Dryocopus martius), white-tailed eagle (Haliaeetus albicilla), red-backed shrike (Lanius collurio), black kite (Milvus migrans), osprey (Pandion haliaetus), honey buzzard (Pernis apivorus), common tern (Sterna hirundo), black grouse (continental subspecies) (Tetrao tetrix tetrix).
