= Cibla Municipality =

Former municipality of Latvia

Coordinates: 56°33′N 27°53′E

Cibla Municipality Ciblas novads
- Former municipality
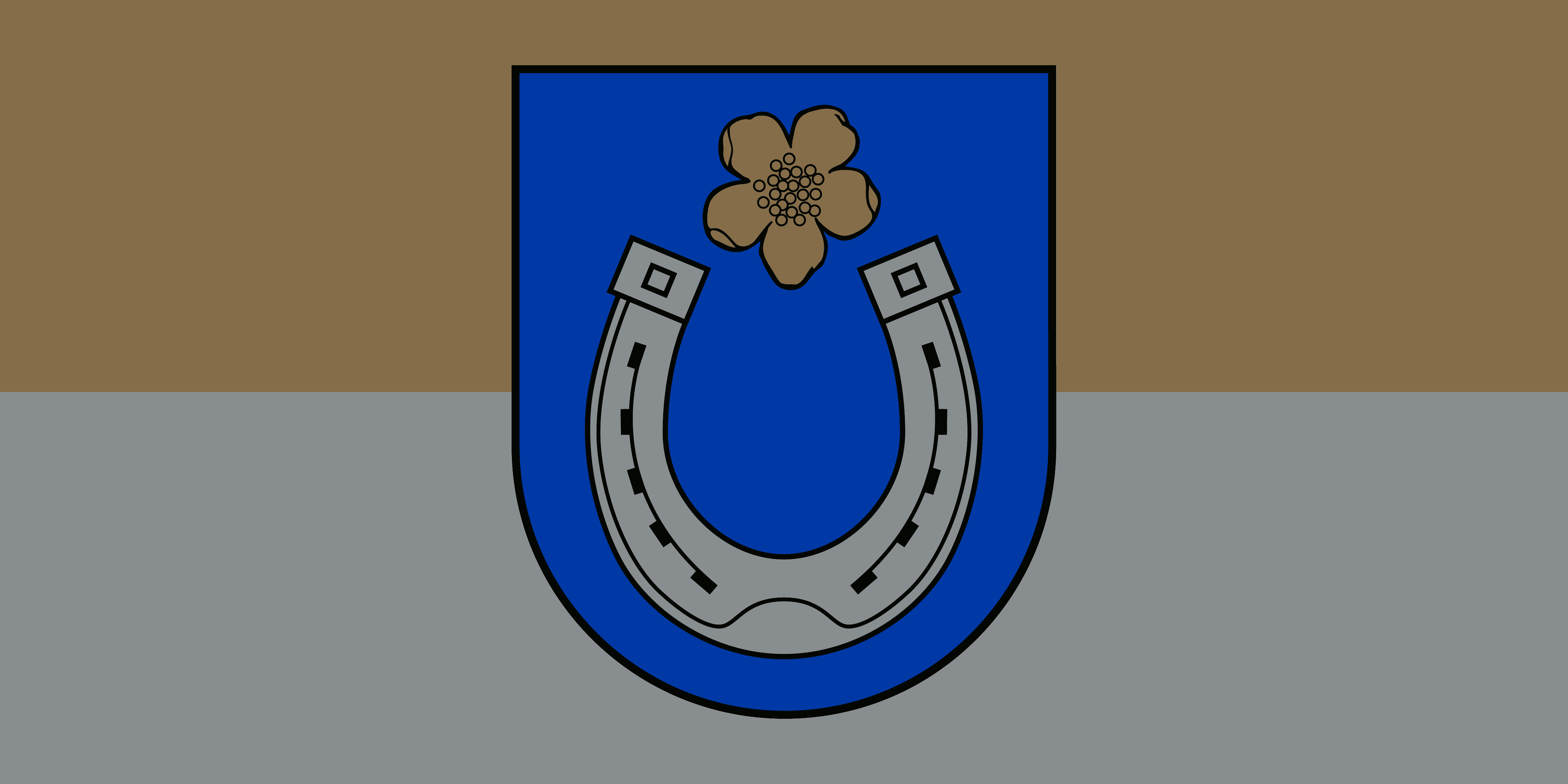
- Flag Coat of arms

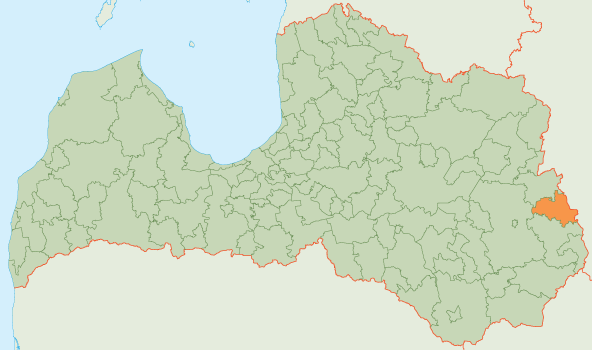
- Country: Latvia
- Formed: 2000
- Dissolved: 2021
- Centre: Blonti

Government
  - Chairman (last): Juris Dombrovskis (ZZS)

Area
  - Total: 509.75 km^{2} (196.82 sq mi)
  - Land: 485.41 km^{2} (187.42 sq mi)
  - Water: 24.34 km^{2} (9.40 sq mi)

Population (2021)
  - Total: 2,362
  - Density: 4.866/km^{2} (12.60/sq mi)
- Website: www.ciblasnovads.lv

Cibla Municipality (Latvian: Ciblas novads, Latgalian: Cyblys nūvods) was a municipality in Latgale, Latvia. The municipality was formed in 2000 by merging two parishes of Ludza district – Cibla parish and Līdumnieki parish. In 2009 it absorbed Blonti parish, Pušmucova parish and Zvirgzdene parish after the dissolution of districts.

The administrative centre of the municipality was Blonti. As of 2020, the population was 2,355.

On 1 July 2021, Cibla Municipality ceased to exist and its territory was merged into Ludza Municipality.

== See also ==
- Administrative divisions of Latvia (2009)
