= Malnava Manor =

Manor house in Latvia

- Malnava Parish, Ludza Municipality, Latgale, Latvia
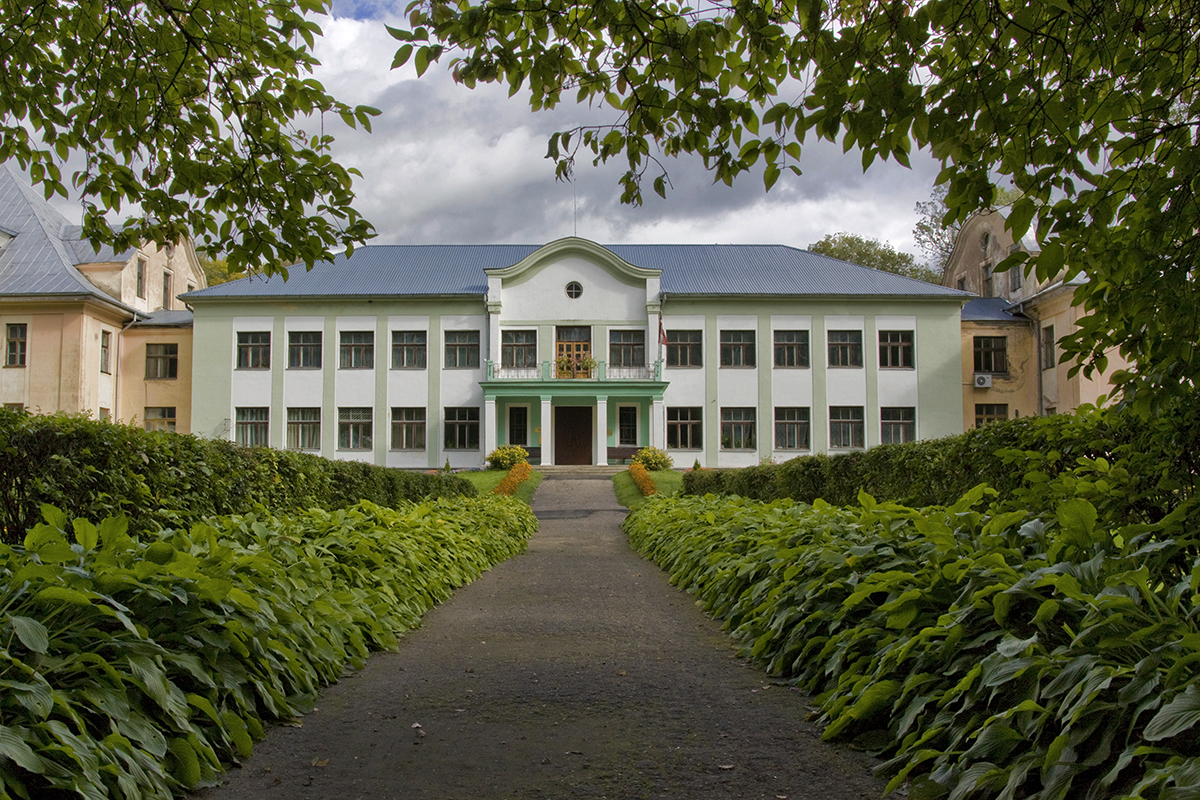
- Malnava Manor House

Site information
- Type: Manor

Location
- Coordinates: 56°46′35.1″N 27°43′12.0″E

Malnava Manor (Latvian: Malnavas muiža, Polish: Małnów) is a manor in Malnava Parish, Ludza Municipality in the Latgale region of Latvia.

== History ==
Malnava was originally part of Cecina manor, later known as Salnava Manor. Until 1724, the estate belonged to Hülsen noble family, one of the great landowners in Latgale. Jadwiga Hülsen married Jan Szadurski and the estate was inherited by marriage to the Szadurski family. The manor stood in the name of the Szadurski in 1774. According to a 1784 audit, the rulers were brothers Józef Szadurski and Ksawery Szadurski. The sons of the latter, Mikolaj Szadurski and Vikenty Szadurski, divided Malnava and Salnava estates among themselves: Malnava became the property of Mikolaj. After the abolition of serfdom, riots took place in 1863. Baron Julius von der Ropp bought the manor in 1878, during which the peasants protested against the soul census (1881). In 1906 S. F. Agarkov acquired the manor. Immediately before the First World War, the manor was owned by Lieutenant Alexander Alexandrovna Svetšina (born Svetišina), the wife of Lieutenant General Ivan Nikolaevich Svetshin (1863–1930), who lived in St. Petersburg. After Latvian agrarian reforms in 1920s manor house was nationalized and lands partitioned.

During World War II Adolf Hitler visited Wehrmacht's Army Group North Headquarters in Malnava. In 2005, Latvian TV filmed a movie called "A Step in the Tower" about this event. A new, larger manor house was built after extensive damage occurred to the previous structure near the end of World War II. The building is part of the Malnava college and secondary school (lv), which provides an agricultural and technical training curriculum.

== Manor Park ==
Malnava Park is a noteworthy cultural and historical object, planted around 1830 - during the time of Count Shadurska. The Count himself loved nature and was interested in gardening, so he decided to plant the park behind the manor house. Since he was not Latvian, he was interested in exotic trees and shrubs. The park occupies an area of 18 ha (together with Ziedone - the second part of the park). There is a pond with a fountain in the manor park. The park has a regular layout with French-style features, geometric (symmetrical - what's right on the left as well - seen at the white gate), one of the oldest in Latvia and, if it weren't affected by war, would be richer in foreign species.

Native tree species grow here: maple, ash, oak, tilia, hazel, fragile willow, elms, snipes; of the rare - several species of fir-tree, species of tree of life, Tatar maple, Canadian aspen, walnut, etc. The park also grows rare acacia, the most common tree in the park is larch. In total, 51 of these species were planted, all introduced in this area where they have not previously grown. A stone wall with a tile roof was erected around the park. Stone fragments have survived to this day. Locals tell unconfirmed stories about underground passages from the park to Goliševa Parish and Kārsava Station.

== See also ==
- List of palaces and manor houses in Latvia
