= Pasiene Parish =

Parish of Latvia

- parish of Latvia
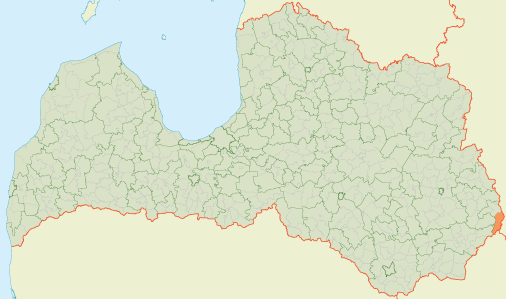
- 56°14′06″N 28°08′45″E
- Country: Latvia

Area
  - Total: 120.38 km^{2} (46.48 sq mi)
  - Land: 118.38 km^{2} (45.71 sq mi)
  - Water: 2 km^{2} (0.8 sq mi)

Population (1 January 2024)
  - Total: 412
  - Density: 3.4/km^{2} (8.9/sq mi)

Pasiene Parish (Latvian: Pasienes pagasts) was an administrative unit of the now defunct Ludza district in Latvia. As a result of the 2009 administrative divisions reform of Latvia, Lauderi Parish was absorbed by Zilupe Municipality. Since 1 July 2021, Lauderi Parish is part of Ludza Municipality.

== Towns, villages and settlements of Pasiene parish ==
- Pasiene
