= Zilupe Municipality =

Municipality of Latvia

Coordinates: 56.3873°N 28.1212°E

Zilupe Municipality Zilupes novads
- Municipality
- Coat of arms

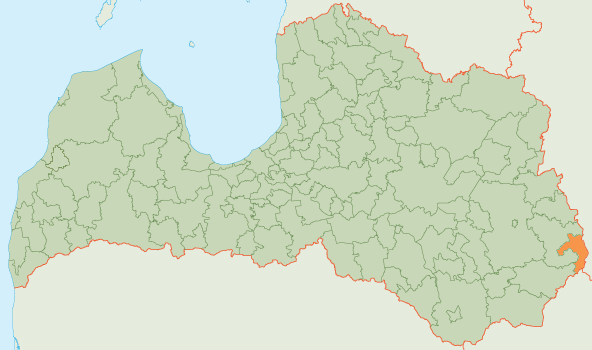
- Country: Latvia
- Formed: 2002
- Centre: Zilupe

Government
  - Council Chair: Oļegs Agafonovs (Latgale Party)

Area
  - Total: 308.84 km^{2} (119.24 sq mi)
  - Land: 302.84 km^{2} (116.93 sq mi)
  - Water: 6 km^{2} (2.3 sq mi)

Population (2021)
  - Total: 2,549
  - Density: 8.417/km^{2} (21.80/sq mi)
- Website: www.zilupe.lv

Zilupe Municipality (Latvian: Zilupes novads) is a former municipality in the historical region of Latgale, and the Latgale Planning Region in Latvia. The municipality was formed in 2002 by merging Zaļesje Parish and Zilupe. In 2009 it absorbed Lauderi Parish and Pasiene Parish, the administrative centre being Zilupe. Zilupe, Lauderi, Zaļesje and Pasiene are among the towns and villages located in the municipality. The population as of 2020 was 2,575.

On 1 July 2021, Zilupe Municipality ceased to exist and its territory was merged into Ludza Municipality.

== Demographics ==
=== Ethnic composition ===
As of 1 January 2010 the ethnic composition of the municipality is as follows:

Ethnic group	Number	%
Russians	2014	54,23 %
Latvians	879	23,67 %
Belarusians	605	16,23 %
Poles	88	2,37 %
Ukrainians	61	1,64 %
Others	68	1,83 %

== See also ==
- Administrative divisions of Latvia
