= Felicianova Manor =

Manor in Latvia

- Latgale, Latvia
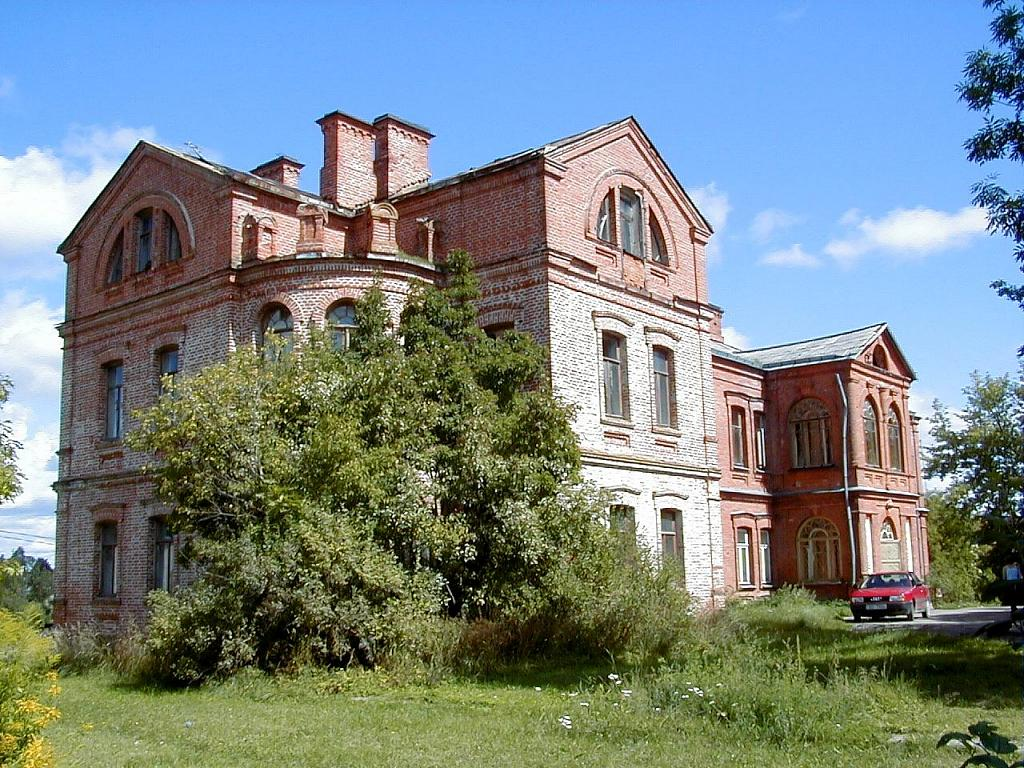
- Felicianova Manor in 2001.

Site information
- Type: Manor

Location
- Coordinates: 56°32′08″N 27°51′53″E

Felicianova Manor is a Neo-Gothic manor house in the Cibla Parish of Ludza Municipality, in the historical region of Latgale, in eastern Latvia.

== Origin of the manor name ==
The origin of Felicianova's name is not clearly known, but there are two versions. According to first version Angel Dionizi the eldest son of Ignatius ruled Zabolotjes Manor and Ignatius second son Andrew - Eversmuiža Manor (1769), but Ignatius' brother, Felicians, was probably a temporary owner of the land of the expelled landlord Jan Bugvecki and had only begun to establish Felicianova's ( nova - new) half manor, or folverku, but already in 1786 Ozupine Manor owner is Zaremba. According to second version Felicia ( Felicia nova ) - female name, but no such name is known in this manor.

== History ==
Felicianova is a relatively new manor. In 1784 it was not yet in the general description of manors. In the territory of the Ozupine manor there is mentioned the folklore Felicianova , where there was only one wooden animal house by the wells . The Felicianov mill, too, has not yet existed, it is mentioned under Morozovka village and belonged to Eversmuiža. Ozupine then owned Mary Zaremba, from which the Plen family could buy land and build a significant estate, mainly due to industrial companies. Agriculture was less important. Of the 21 villages, eight became the property of Felicianov. At the time of the "souls" audit of 1858, the manor was already there. It remained the sole property of the Plen family until 1944. True, only the manor center itself with industrial enterprises, because the rural area was divided into farmsteads.

=== 1862 to 1918 ===
In 1862 the land area of Felicianova manor was 9372262 (1.09225 hectares of desetine), in 1897 the manor owned 8 villages with 108 hosts and 693 inhabitants. There were watermills, leather workshops. The manor house was a two-story brick building. In 1912, the owners were Michael and Vasily Plen. The estate was valued at 33,000 rubles.

=== After the First World War ===
The Plen family remained in the manor, although the land was expropriated, preserving only a small area. The Plen family left the manor during the German repatriation in 1939. Returned after the beginning of the WWII and left it permanently in 1944.

== See also ==
- List of palaces and manor houses in Latvia
