= Blonti =

Village in Latvia

- village
- Location within Latvia
- Country: Latvia
- Municipality: Ludza Municipality
- Elevation: 145 m (476 ft)

Population
  - Total: 229
- Post code: LV-5706

Blonti is a village in Blonti Parish, Ludza Municipality in the Latgale region of Latvia.
