= Briģi =

Village in Latvia

Coordinates: 56.4206°N 28.0669°E

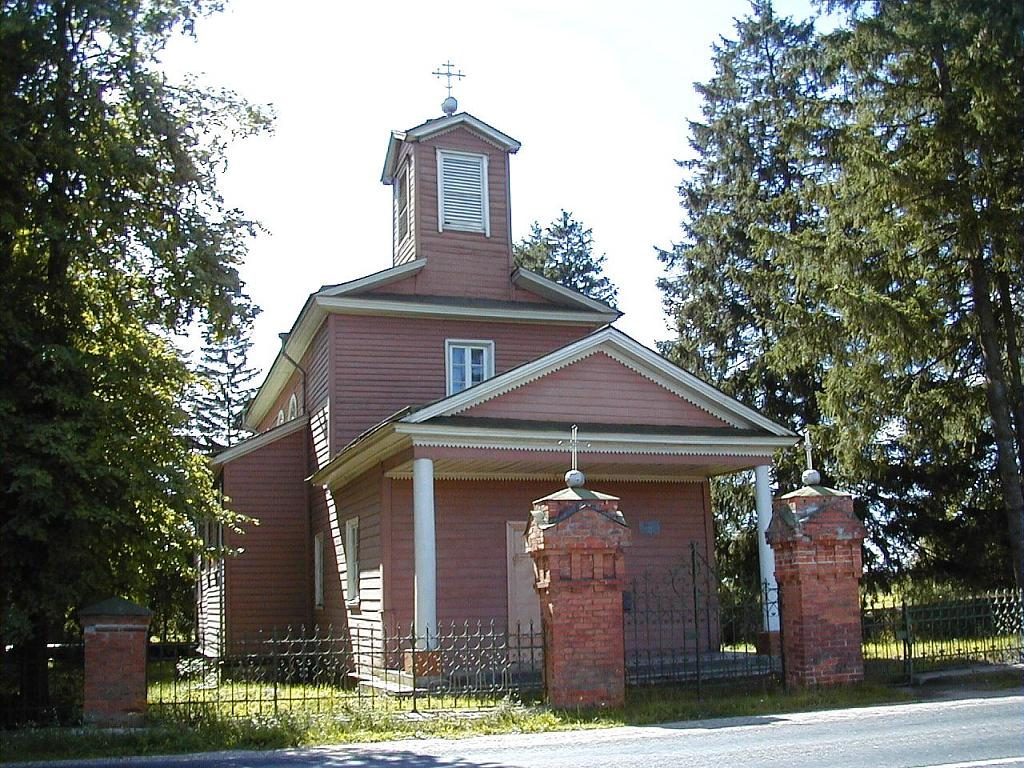
Briģi

Briģi is a village located in Briģi Parish, Ludza Municipality in the Latgale region of Latvia. It is the center of the Parish.
