= Līdumnieki Parish =

Parish in Ludza Municipality, Latvia

- parish of Latvia
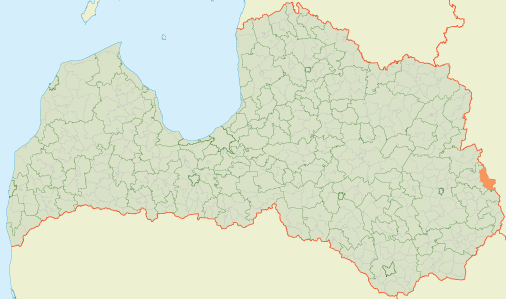
- 56°34′51″N 28°00′51″E
- Country: Latvia

Area
  - Total: 161.10 km^{2} (62.20 sq mi)
  - Land: 154.61 km^{2} (59.70 sq mi)
  - Water: 6.49 km^{2} (2.51 sq mi)

Population (1 January 2025)
  - Total: 198
  - Density: 1.28/km^{2} (3.32/sq mi)

Līdumnieki Parish (Latvian: Līdumnieku pagasts, Latgalian: Leidumnīku pogosts) is an administrative unit of Ludza Municipality in the Latgale region of Latvia. The administrative center is Līdumnieki.

It was a part of Cibla Municipality from 2009 to its merge into Ludza Municipality on 1 July 2021.
