= Salnava Manor =

Manor house in Latvia

- Latgale, Latvia
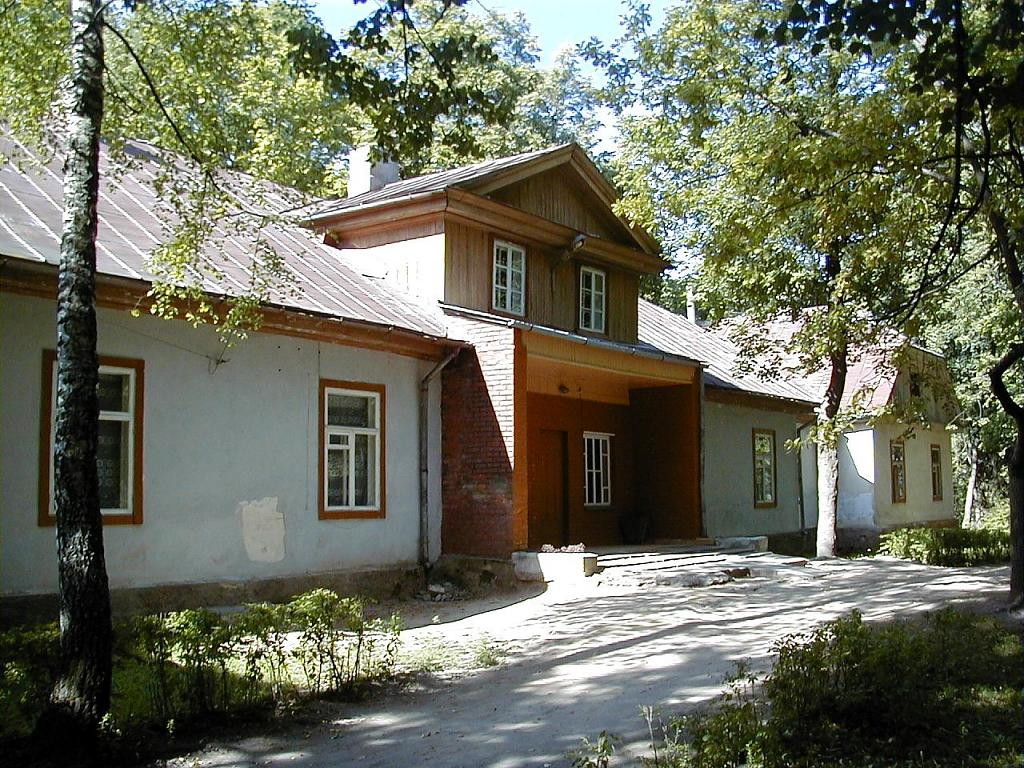

Site information
- Type: Manor

Location
- Coordinates: 56.8150°N 27.5533°E

Salnava Manor is a manor in Salnava Parish, Ludza Municipality in the Latgale region of Latvia. Presently Salnava Manor house is used as school building.

== History ==
Salnava Manor was property of Barons Vulfiuss ( or Wulffius ) from the 1860s up until 1944. It came to the Wulfiuss family through Countess Jekaterina Sollugub who married into the Wulffius family.

== See also ==
- Malnava Manor
- List of palaces and manor houses in Latvia
