= Ņivņiki =

Village in Briģi Parish, Latvia

Coordinates: 56°26′N 28°03′E

Ņivņiki is a village located in the Briģi Parish of Ludza Municipality in the Latgale region of Latvia.
