= Eversmuiža Manor =

Manor House in Latvia

- Latgale, Latvia
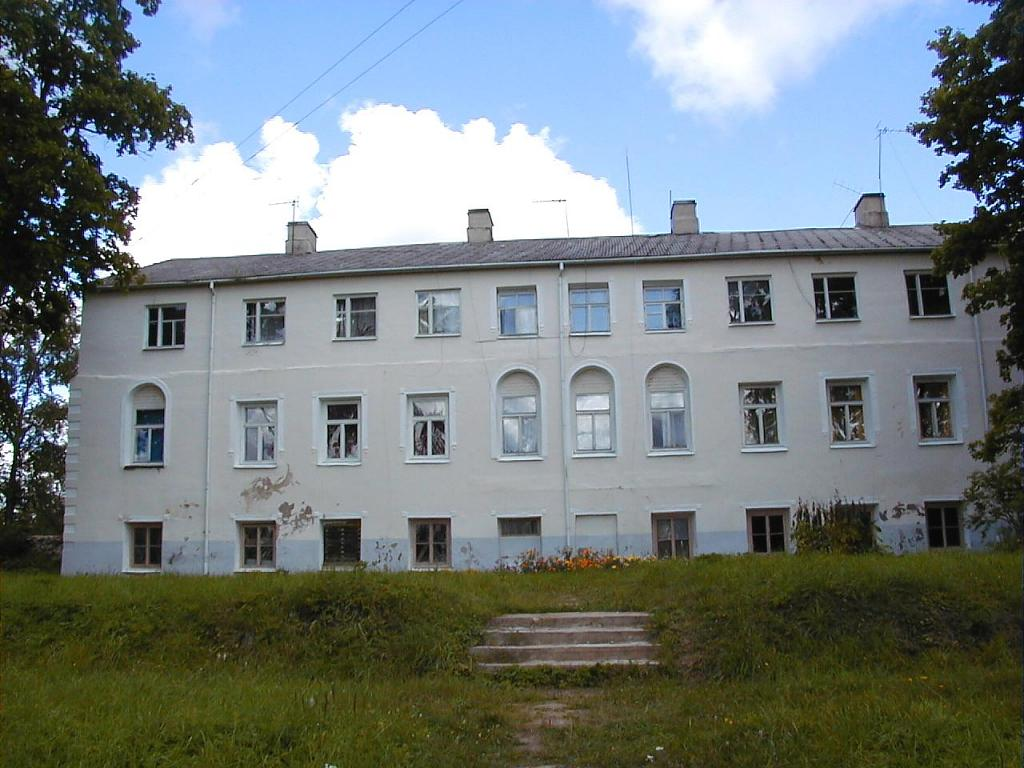

Site information
- Type: Manor

Location
- Coordinates: 56°33′12.6″N 27°52′12.6″E

Eversmuiža Manor (Polish: Ewersmujża, Russian: Эвермуйжа) is a manor in the Cibla Parish of Ludza Municipality in the Latgale region of Latvia.

== History ==
It is known that Polish nobles Karnicki owned lands in estate Cibla (Eversmuiža) for about 350 years. Later estate was divided and new Felicianova Manor established.

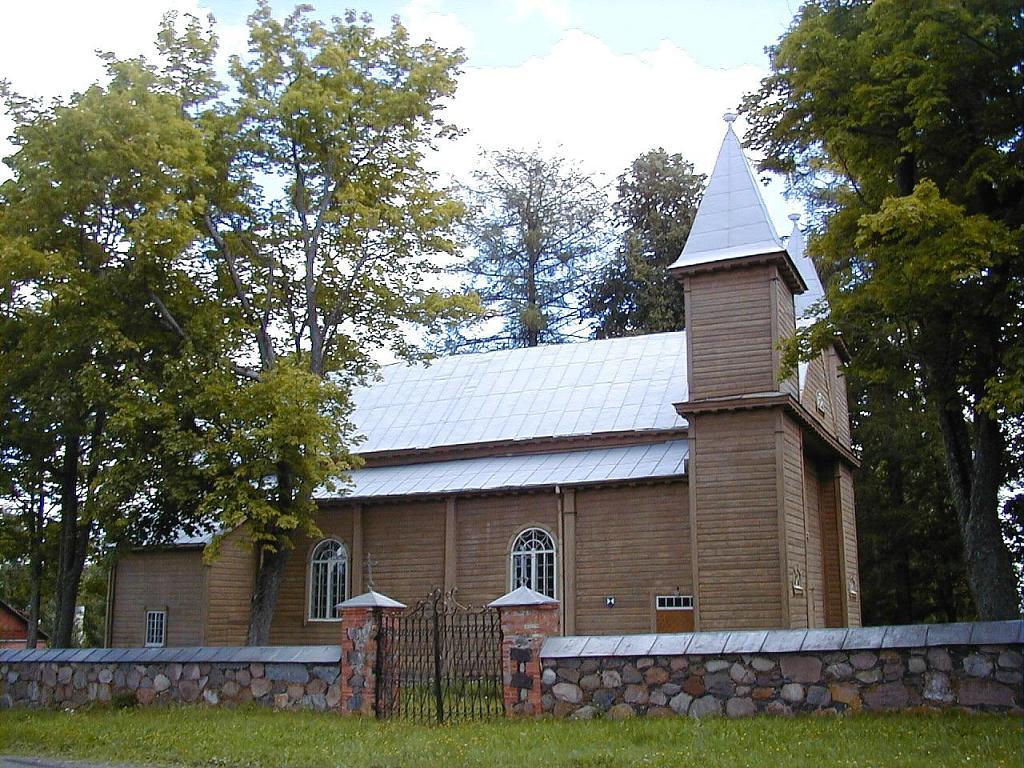
Roman Catholic church of St. Andrew in Eversmuiža

== See also ==
- List of palaces and manor houses in Latvia
