= Grebņova =

Village in Latvia

- Village
- Location in Latvia
- Coordinates: 56°51′30″N 27°48′51″E
- Country: Latvia
- Municipality: Ludza Municipality
- Elevation: 95 m (312 ft)

Population (2007)
  - Total: 10
- Time zone: UTC+2 (EET)
  - Summer (DST): UTC+3 (EEST)
- Postal code: LV-5750

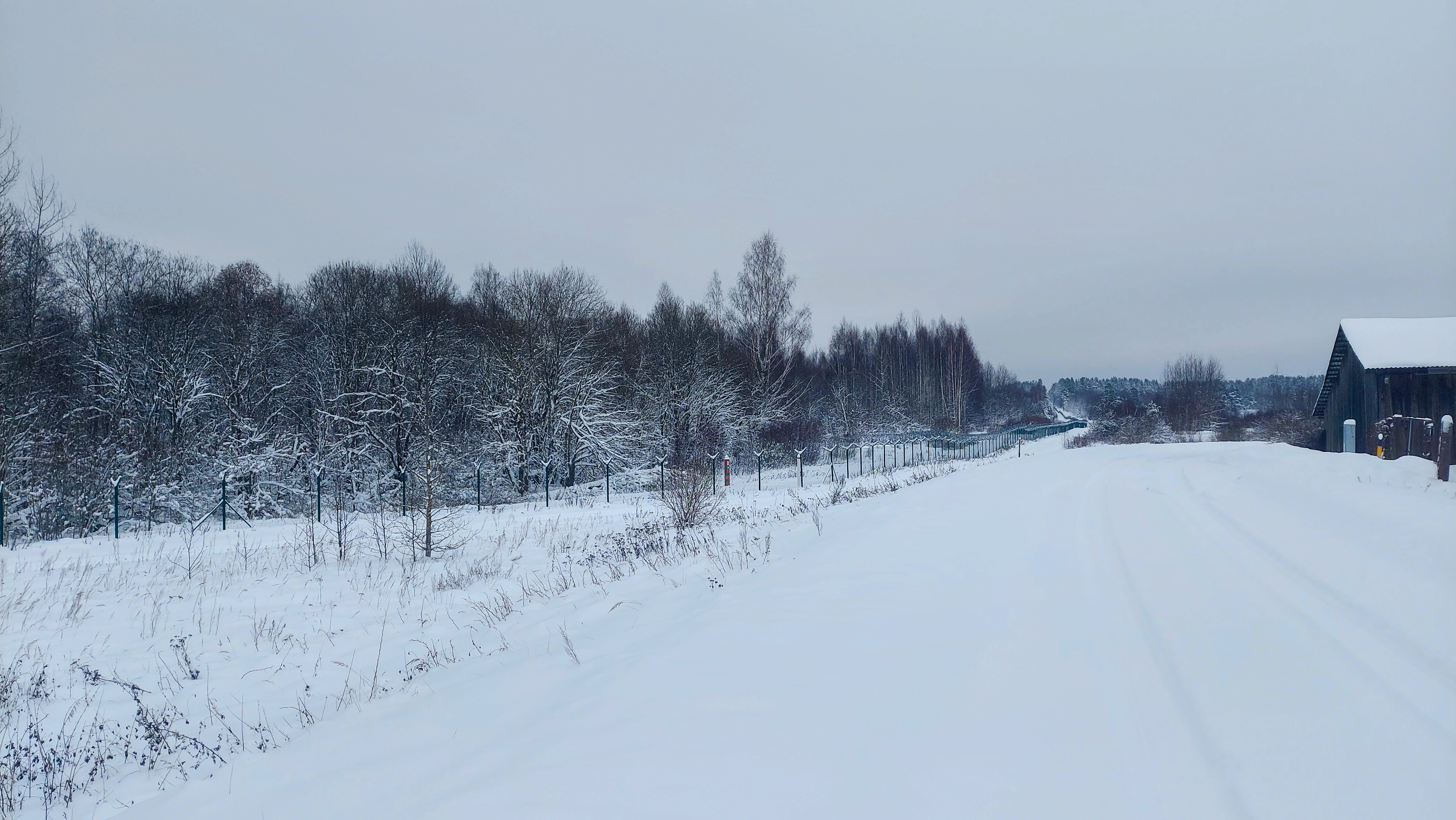
Russian border near Grebņova

Grebņova, also spelled Grebņeva, is a village in Malnava Parish, Ludza Municipality, Latvia. It is located in the northern part of the parish on the Russian border near the A13 road, 13 km (8.1 mi) from the parish center Malnava and 288 km (179 mi) from Riga. There is a cemetery in Grebņova, north of the village and its namesake border checkpoint.
