= Antonio Paim =

Brazilian philosopher and historian (1927–2021)

Antonio Ferreira Paim (Jacobina, 7 April 1927 – São Paulo, 30 April 2021) was a Brazilian philosopher and historian, regarded as one of the main specialists on the history of Brazilian philosophy. A former student at the University of Moscow and in his youth a militant of the Brazilian Communist Party, he later rose to prominence partly due to his fierce critiques of Marxism and of the Brazilian educational system, contained in his book Marxismo e Descendência.

A professor at the Federal University of Rio de Janeiro and at the Pontifical Catholic University of Rio de Janeiro, he was among the founders of the Brazilian Academy of Philosophy, a member of the Brazilian Historic and Geographic Institute and a permanent collaborator to the Revista Brasileira de Filosofia, a scientific journal published by the Brazilian Institute of Philosophy. In 1985, he was awarded the Prêmio Jabuti for his book A História das Ideias Filosóficas no Brasil.

He was one of the inspirations for the policies of former Minister of Brazilian Education Ricardo Vélez Rodríguez.
