= Terehova, Latvia =

Terehova
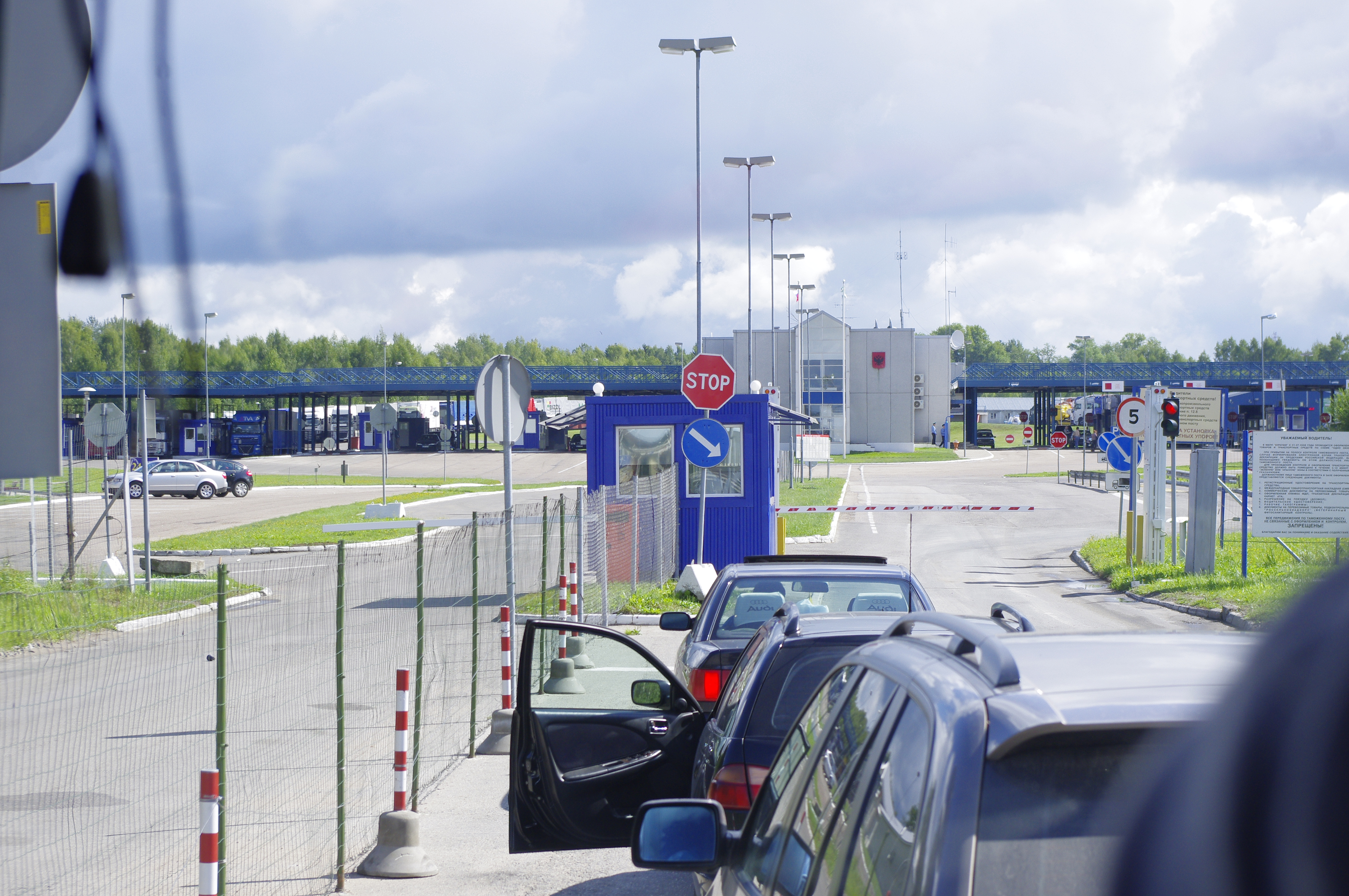
- Terehova border checkpoint, view from the Latvian side
- Interactive map of Terehova
- Coordinates: 56°21′11″N 28°11′06″E
- Country: Latvia
- Municipality: Ludza
- Parish: Zaļesje Parish

Terehova is a village in the Zaļesje Parish of Ludza Municipality in the Latgale region of Latvia.

The Latvia–Russia border between the Republic of Latvia (EU member) and the Russian Federation (CIS member) which is an external border of the European Union has a checkpoint in the municipality of Terehova via road E22 / A12 / M9 near Zilupe. Terehova is connected to Ventspils by the European route E22, one of the best known roads in Latvia and one of the longest European routes.

The village is considered the easternmost municipality of Latvia.

== See also ==
- Terehova (disambiguation)
