= Lauderi =

Village in Latvia

Coordinates: 56°20′N 28°00′E

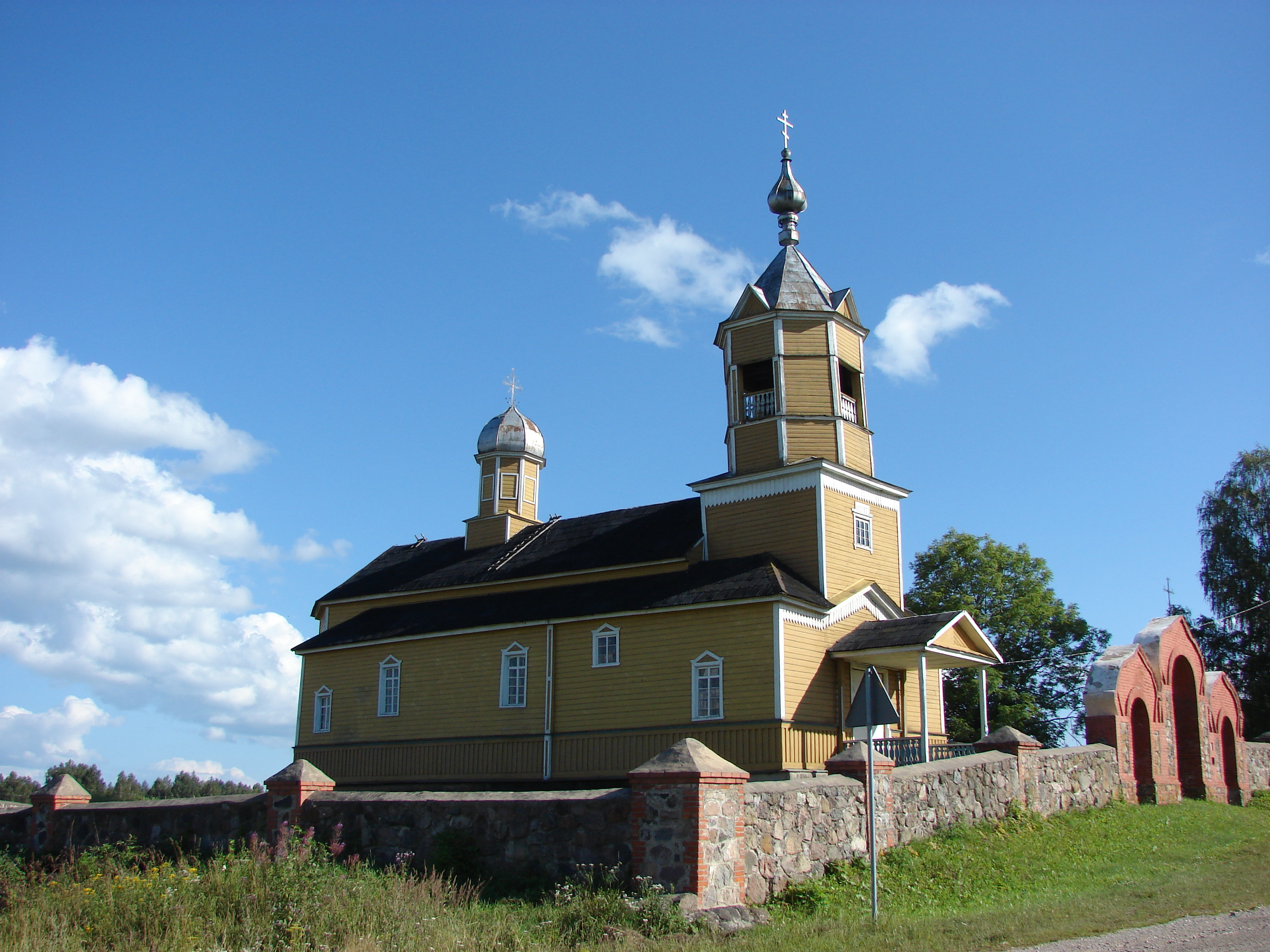
Lauderi

Lauderi is a village in the Lauderi Parish of Ludza Municipality in the Latgale region and the Latgale Planning Region in Latvia.
