= Terehova =

Terehova sometimes written Teregova may refer to:

== People ==
- Irina Terehova (born 1989), Moldovan model

== Places ==
- Terehova, municipality in Latvia
- Teregova, river in Romania
- Teregova, commune in western Romania
