= Gerd Bornheim =

Brazilian philosopher and professor

Gerd Alberto Bornheim (19 November 1929 – 5 September 2002) was a Brazilian philosopher and professor. Considered one of Brazil's leading Heidegger scholars, he worked primarily with aesthetics, existentialism, and the history of Philosophy, specializing on pre-socratic thought and romantic philosophy. He was one of the founders of the Brazilian Academy of Philosophy.

== Career ==
He graduated with a degree in Philosophy from the Pontifical Catholic University of Rio Grande do Sul, then moved to Paris to study at the University of Paris under Jean Hyppolite and Jean Wahl, who introduced him to the works of Martin Heidegger. He then received a scholarship to the University of Oxford, where he studied English literature.

In Brazil, he taught at the Federal University of Rio Grande do Sul, at the Federal University of Rio de Janeiro and at the State University of Rio de Janeiro.

== Works ==
- Aspectos Filosóficos do Romantismo. Instituto Estadual do Livro, 1959.
- O Sentido e a Máscara. São Paulo: Perspectiva, 1969.
- Martin Heidegger: L’Être et le Temps. Sorbone, 1976.
- Dialética: Teoria e Prática. Globo, 1977.
- O Idiota e o Espírito Objetivo. Porto Alegre: Globo, 1980.
- Teatro a Cena Dividica. Porto Alegre: LPM, 1983.
- Introdução ao Filosofar: o Pensamento Filosófico em Bases Existenciais. São Paulo: Globo, 1989.
- Brecht: a Estética do Teatro. Graal, 1992.
- O Conceito de Descobrimento. Rio de Janeiro: EdUERJ, 1998.
- Os Filósofos Pré-Socráticos. São Paulo: Cultrix, 1999-2000.
- Sartre: Metafísica e Existencialismo. São Paulo: Perspectiva, 2001.
- Metafísica e Finitude. São Paulo: Perspectiva, 2001.
