= Briģi Parish =

Parish of Latvia

- parish of Latvia
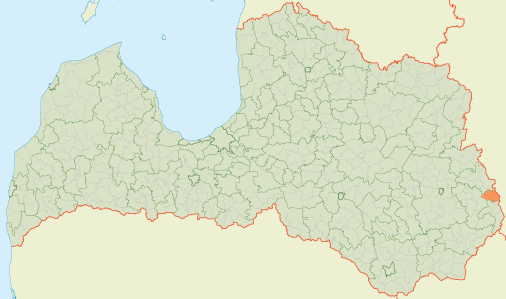
- Coordinates: 56°26′56″N 28°04′03″E
- Country: Latvia

Population (1 January 2026)
  - Total: 433

Briģi parish (Latvian: Briģu pagasts) is an administrative unit of Ludza Municipality in the Latgale region of Latvia (prior to 2009 of the former Ludza district). It is located on the Russia-Latvia border.

== Towns, villages and settlements of Briģi parish ==
- Briģi
