= William Robyn =

American tenor and vaudevillian

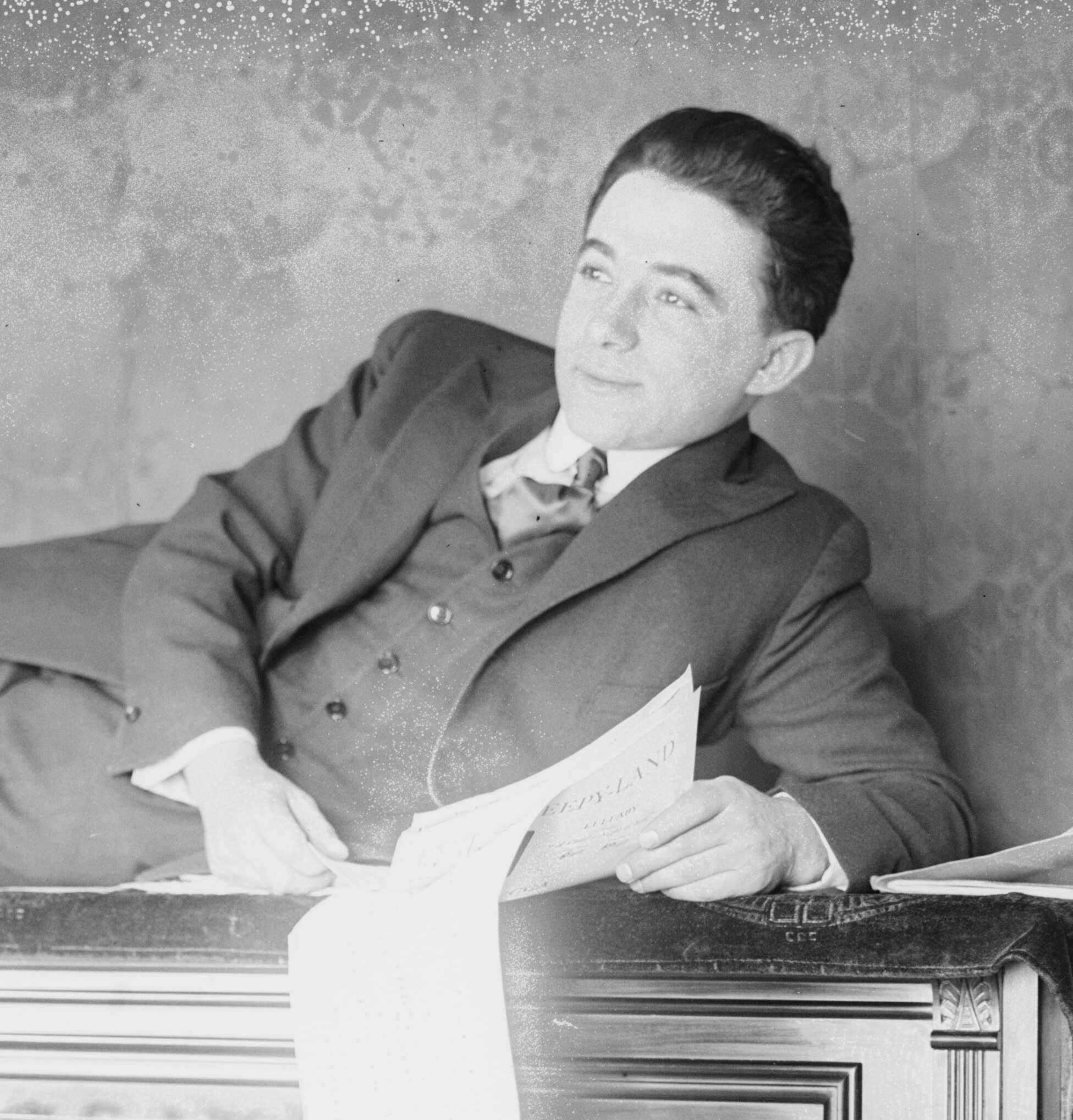

Background information
- Also known as: Wolf Scarpioff, Thornley Crane, Wee Willie Robyn, William Rubin
- Born: William Robinow; November 28, 1894; Pasiene, Vitebsk Governorate, Russian Empire
- Died: April 12, 1996 (aged 101) Englewood, New Jersey
- Genres: Opera, Broadway
- Occupations: Singer, hazzan (cantor)
- Instrument: Voice
- Years active: 1916–1939
- Labels: Emerson, Victor, Okeh
- Formerly of: Roxy's Gang

William Robyn (November 28, 1894 – April 12, 1996) was the stage name of William Robinow, a Russian-born American tenor who toured the vaudeville circuit and made hundreds of recordings under dozens of names.

== Early life ==
Robyn was born William Rubin in the rural village of Pasiene, Vitebsk Governorate, Russian Empire (today in eastern Latvia) in late 1894 to Israel (Srul) and Gitel Rubin. He was a gifted singer and frequently sang at religious services. After his bar mitzvah he was sent to work in Ludza. He emigrated to the United States in 1913 to escape conscription into the Russian Army, traveling through Poland to Hamburg, Germany where he boarded a steamer to New York City. He arrived at Ellis Island unable to speak a word of English. He settled in Hazleton, Pennsylvania, and lived with his uncle Jacob Traub. He worked as a peddler while also singing at the local synagogue.

Robyn soon left for New York with letters of introduction to music professors at New York University as well as vocal coach Jerome Hayes who was associated with Cornell University. Robyn was taught to sing in French, German, English, and Italian. He met Louis Silvers and Jean Havez who overheard him singing in his apartment above the tailors where they were trying on suits. They found him a pianist, Leon Varvara, and gave him a stage name. They went on the vaudeville circuit billed as "The Famous Russian Boy Tenor, Wolf Scarpioff, and Master Boy Pianist, Leon Varvara." After receiving a favorable review in Variety, the duo performed in New York City, Troy, Schenectady, Rochester and Detroit.

Robyn became a naturalized US citizen in 1920.

== Musical career ==
Robyn made recordings for most of the major labels in the New York area between 1919 and 1939, in a variety of languages including Yiddish, English, and Russian. His first recordings seem to have been a set of Irish songs in 1916 with a vocal ensemble at the Victor Recording Company in Camden, New Jersey. After that, he did not record for a few years, and toured for most of 1917 and 1918. It was in 1919 he began recording many more discs as a solo act; at this time many were Russian-language folk songs and Yiddish theatre songs by contemporary composers like Joseph Rumshinsky. He also recorded for other labels; at Emerson he released discs under the names William Robinson and Edward Hamilton. He recorded a few Russian records for Columbia under the name William Scarpioff. His disc "Tulip Time", recorded for Brunswick under the name Thornley Crane, was cited in The Talking Machine World as one of Brunswick's better sellers. When he recorded for Okeh that was the first time he used the stage name Robyn.

Robyn was hired by the Capitol Theater in 1920, performing in many of their operatic productions. He briefly left to perform in theaters in Chicago but came back to the Capitol where he performed for most of the 1920s. He got a contract with the Victor Talking Machine Company and his first release, "I'm in Heaven When I'm in My Mother's Arms"/"Down the Trail to Home, Sweet Home" was issued in October 1920. He recorded "Molly-O" for Victor in January 1922 which was a tie-in with a movie which sent him briefly to Hollywood. He also continued to record Yiddish theatre songs prolifically for Victor records during these years.

When commercial radio broadcasting began in New York, Robyn sang on live broadcasts with The Capitol Theatre Family, later called Roxy's Gang after Capitol stage manager S.L. "Roxy" Rothafel, in a networked Sunday night radio show. This group performed for President Coolidge at the White House in 1925.

Robyn left Victor in 1923 after they refused to pay him more money and largely consigned him to their foreign-language series. He began working for Henry Waterson and his Cameo label, recording many songs by Irving Berlin such as "All Alone," "Always" and "Blue Skies." When Cameo went bankrupt in 1927 Robyn continued to work for Pathé Records under names such as John Spear, Wyllie Robyn, Jack Ender, or Wee Willie Robyn because of his short stature. Over the course of his career, Robyn's recordings appeared on more than 50 labels under more than 50 different names. In the 1930s he shifted to radio and stage work, performing musicals in Latvian, Russian, Yiddish and English.

== Cantor work and later life ==
Robyn decided to leave show business entirely and dedicate himself to becoming a cantor first working at the Nathan Straus Jewish Center in the Bronx in 1939. He served on the executive council of the Cantors Assembly under the name William Robyn-Rubin. He later moved to Temple B'nai Sholom on Long Island and in 1946, to the Temple Israel Center in White Plains, where he remained for almost 20 years, retiring in 1965. In the late 1940s Robyn became a founding member of the Cantors Association of America. He continued to make recordings, some under the name Cantor William Rubin. He retired from Temple Israel in 1965.

In 1975 Robyn attended the Edison artists' reunion at West Orange, New Jersey where he sang "The Sunshine of Your Smile". He met Milford Fargo who was a professor of music at the Eastman School. Fargo arranged a short tour of Canada for Robyn in the fall of 1984. Fargo gave a talk about Robyn's life at the 1985 Association for Recorded Sound Collections Conference in San Francisco.

== Death and legacy ==
Robyn died in 1996 at the age of 101. Two of Robyn's recordings are available in the National Jukebox at The Library of Congress.
