= Romano Galeffi =

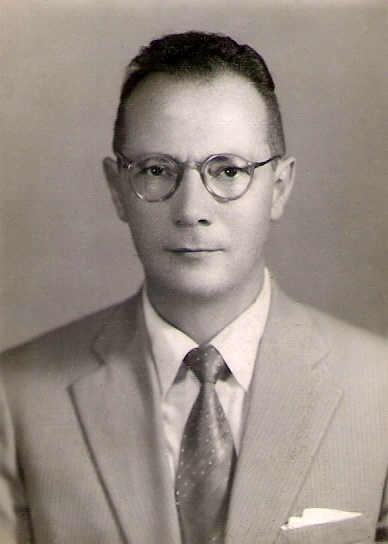

Personal details
- Born: 17 November 1915 Montevarchi, Toscana, Italy
- Died: 1 January 1998 (aged 82) Salvador, Bahia, Brazil
- Education: Sapienza University of Rome
- Occupation: professor, art critic, writer

Romano Galeffi (17 November 1915 – 1 January 1988) was an Italian philosopher, art critic, and professor. He established the course in Aesthetics at the Federal University of Bahia, the first program of its kind in Brazil.

== Biography ==
Born in Montevarchi, Galeffi completed his secondary education in Arezzo before moving to Rome to enroll at La Sapienza, where he attended lectures by Giovanni Gentile, Ugo Spirito, and Franco Lombardi (it), but above all by Benedetto Croce, of whom he became a disciple.

He graduated in 1945 with a thesis on Henri Bergson, which was recognized by the likes of Louis Lavelle and Jacques Chevalier.

Galeffi moved to Brazil at the invitation of Isaías Alves, settling in Salvador. A professor at the Federal University of Bahia and a member of the Brazilian Institute of Philosophy, he left a vast contribution to Brazilian culture, including works on Immanuel Kant and Antonio Rosmini, as well as books on the philosophy of art.

== Works ==
- La filosofia di Bergson (1949)
- Concepção atual do humanismo (1953)
- Atualidade de Kant (1953)
- Kant: personalidade e obra (1956)
- Atualidade de Antonio Rosmini (1956)
- Il sacro come contenuto artistico (1960)
- Presença de Bergson (1961)
- A autonomia da arte na estética de Benedetto Croce (1966)
- investigações de Estética (1971)
- Fundamentos da Criação Artística (1977)
- Fundamentos da Critica de Arte (1985)
- A Filosofia de Immanuel Kant (1986)
