= Stanislavs Ladusãns =

Latvian-Brazilian academic and Catholic priest

- Prof. Dr. Pe. Stanislavs Ladusãns
- Born: 22 August 1912; Rudzeiši, Zvirgzdene Parish, Latgale, Latvia
- Died: 25 July 1993 (aged 80); Rio de Janeiro, Brazil
- Education: Pontifical Gregorian University

Stanislavs Ladusãns (Latvian: Staņislavs Ladusāns, 22 August 1912 – 25 July 1993) was a Latvian-Brazilian professor of philosophy, a member of the Brazilian Academy of Philosophy, and a Jesuit priest who arrived in Brazil on 17 February 1947. He also lived in Poland and Italy.

== Life and education ==
Ladusãns earned his PhD from the Pontifical Gregorian University in Rome. In 1970, he founded the Brazilian Society of Catholic Philosophers and later the Center for Philosophical Research in São Paulo. From 1953 onwards, Ladusãns took over the direction of the Library of the Center for Higher Studies of the Society of Jesus, specializing in Philosophy and Theology.

Already with a post-doctorate degree, Ladusãns was not able to return to Latvia because of the Soviet occupation. He hid his identity from the security organs, since, at the time, Latvians were forcibly repatriated to the Soviet Union. His ideas emerge from the thirteenth century and synthesize Thomism from the standpoint of modern philosophy and phenomenology. He was also a scholar of the Prussian philosopher Immanuel Kant, to whom he devoted his doctoral thesis.

== Career ==
He was one of the first to divulge the concrete philosophy of Mário Ferreira dos Santos. During a scientific research on the situation of Brazilian philosophical thought, he came into contact with Mário's philosophy with whom he began to have frequent personal contacts.

Stanislavs Ladusãns also organized four congresses of philosophy. He was a member of the Pontifical University of Saint Thomas Aquinas and President of the Inter-American Catholic Association of Philosophy.

From 1990 until his death (1993), he was professor of Philosophy for the writer Olavo de Carvalho.

== Biographical book ==
Māra Kiope, PhD in Philosophy, professor at the University of Latvia, wrote in 2015 the book Klātbūtne. Latviešu un brazīliešu filozofa jezuīta Staņislava Ladusāna dzīve un darbs, a biography of Stanislaus Ladusãns, 524 pages, I.S.B.N. 9789934506260.

== Books ==
- LADUSÃNS, Stanilavs. O Silêncio que não Silência. Sobretiro de Humanitas, Número 20. Universidad de Nuevo León – 1979.
- Humanismo pluridimensional, Loyola, 1974, v. 2, 1037 p.
- Rumos da filosofia atual no Brasil; em auto-retratos, Loyola, 1976, v. 1. il.
- Pensamento parcial e total, Loyola, 1977, 294 p.
- Criatividade filosófico-cristã hoje, Presença, 1982, 27 p. (Collection "Tema atual", 50).
- Gnosiologia pluridimensional; fundamentos fenomenológico-críticos do conhecimento da verdade, Presença, 1982, 2ª ed., 59 p. (Collection "Tema atual", 51-52).
- Originalidade cristã da filosofia, Presença, 1984, 24 p. (Collection "Tema atual", 72).
- Verdade e certeza, Presença, 1986, 50 p.
- A análise social filosófico-cristã, Presença, 1988, 361 p.
- Questões atuais de bioética, Loyola, 1990, 361 p.
