= Lauderi Parish =

Parish in Ludza Municipality, Latvia

- parish of Latvia
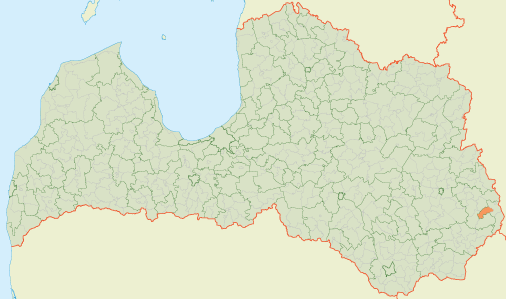
- 56°19′18″N 27°57′44″E
- Country: Latvia

Area
  - Total: 72.81 km^{2} (28.11 sq mi)
  - Land: 72.81 km^{2} (28.11 sq mi)
  - Water: 2.19 km^{2} (0.85 sq mi)

Population (1 January 2025)
  - Total: 213
  - Density: 2.93/km^{2} (7.58/sq mi)

Lauderi Parish (Latvian: Lauderu pagasts) is an administrative territorial entity of the Ludza Municipality in the Latgale region of Latvia.

From 1959 to 2009 it was a part of the now defunct Ludza district. As a result of the 2009 administrative divisions reform of Latvia; Lauderi Parish was included into Zilupe Municipality, until it was merged into Ludza Municipality on 1 July 2021 during the 2021 administrative reform.
