= Agrimol B =

Identifiers
- IUPAC name: (2S)-1-[3,5-bis[(3-butanoyl-2,6-dihydroxy-4-methoxy-5-methylphenyl)methyl]-2,4,6-trihydroxyphenyl]-2-methylbutan-1-one
- CAS Number: 55576-66-4
- PubChem CID: 194000
- ChemSpider: 4475783
- CompTox Dashboard (EPA): 80970914

Chemical and physical data
- Formula: C_{37}H_{46}O_{12}
- Molar mass: 682.763 g·mol^{−1}
- 3D model (JSmol): Interactive image
- SMILES: CCCC(=O)C1=C(C(=C(C(=C1O)CC2=C(C(=C(C(=C2O)C(=O)[C@@H](C)CC)O)CC3=C(C(=C(C(=C3O)C)OC)C(=O)CCC)O)O)O)C)OC
- InChI: InChI=1S/C37H46O12/c1-9-12-23(38)25-32(44)19(29(41)17(5)36(25)48-7)14-21-31(43)22(35(47)27(34(21)46)28(40)16(4)11-3)15-20-30(42)18(6)37(49-8)26(33(20)45)24(39)13-10-2/h16,41-47H,9-15H2,1-8H3/t16-/m0/s1; Key:BVLHMPZMQVWDGX-INIZCTEOSA-N

Agrimol B is a natural product which is found in the plant Agrimonia pilosa, which is used in traditional herbal medicine in various countries in East Asia. It has a complex spectrum of activity, acting as an activator of the SIRT1 protein but an inhibitor of various other enzyme targets. In animal studies it has anti-obesity, anti-parasitic and anti-cancer effects.
