= Malnava Parish =

Parish of Latvia

- parish of Latvia
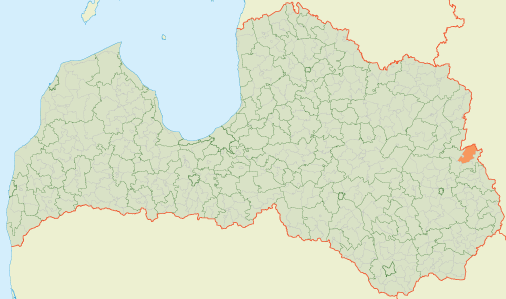
- Coordinates: 56°48′06″N 27°45′04″E
- Country: Latvia

Population (1 January 2026)
  - Total: 880

Malnava Parish (Latvian: Malnavas pagasts) is an administrative territorial entity of Ludza Municipality in the Latgale region of Latvia. Prior to the 2009 administrative reforms it was part of the former Ludza district.

== Towns, villages and settlements of Malnava Parish ==
- Malnava - parish administrative center
- Grebņova

== See also ==
- Malnava Manor
