= Ernildo Stein =

Brazilian philosopher and academic (born 1934)

Ernildo Jacob Stein (born July 12, 1934) is a Brazilian philosopher and academic. Known for his works on Phenomenology and Philosophy of Science, he is considered one of Latin America's leading specialists in the philosophy of Martin Heidegger, whose oeuvre he translated and commented extensively.

== Career ==
Stein was born in Santa Rosa on July 12, 1934. He earned his bachelor's degree in philosophy from the Federal University of Rio Grande do Sul, where he later defended his doctoral thesis. He worked as a research assistant at the Universities of Erlangen Nuremberg, Heidelberg, Frankfurt, Munster, and Wuppertal.

Once returned to his home country, he was appointed professor of philosophy at the Pontifical Catholic University of Rio Grande do Sul. He was a permanent collaborator to the Revista Brasileira de Filosofia, an academic journal published by the Brazilian Institute of Philosophy.
