= Latvia–Russia border =

International border

Coordinates: 56°50′N 27°40′E

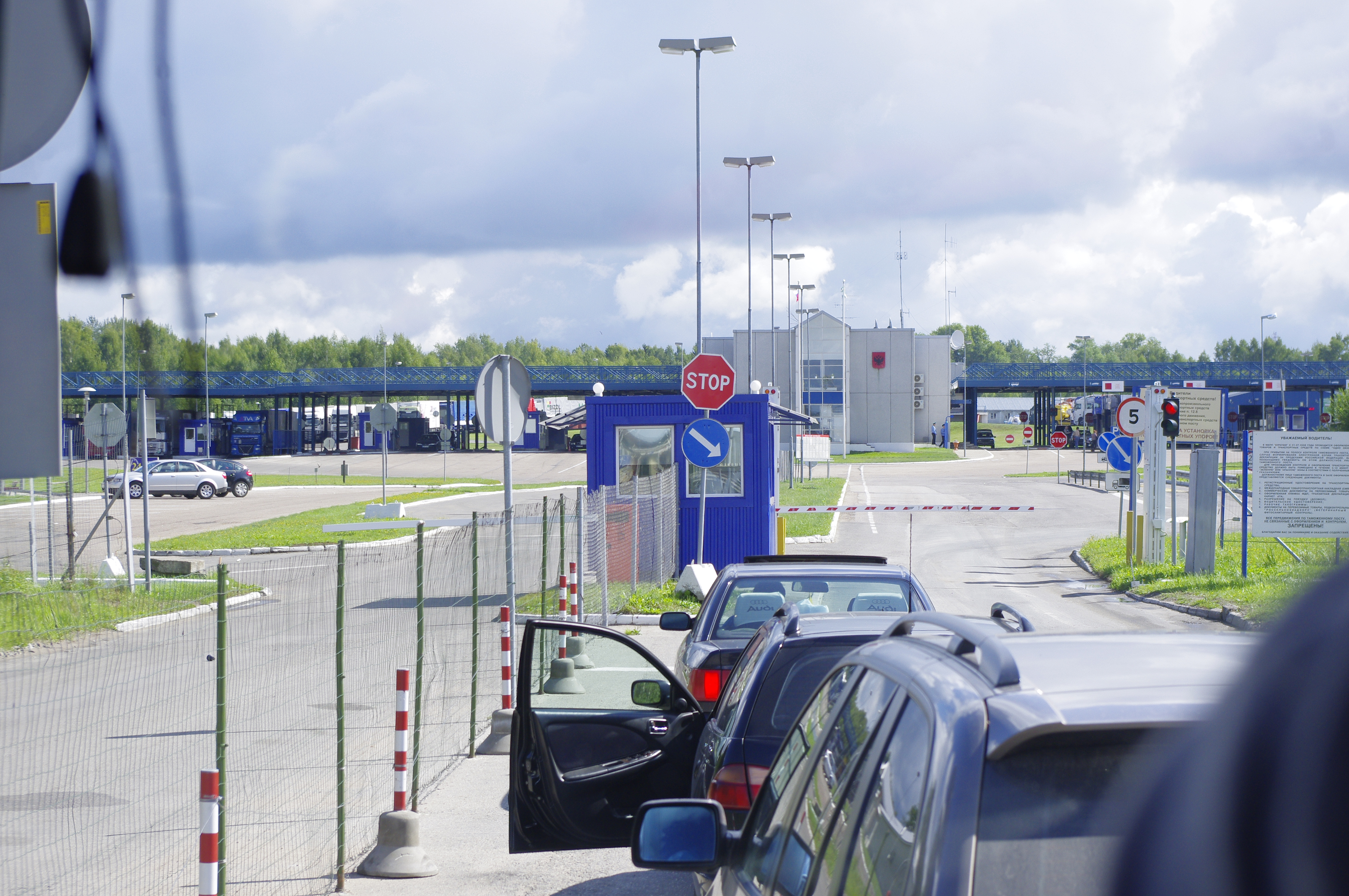
- Terehova border checkpoint, view from the Latvian side

Characteristics
- Entities: Latvia; Russia
- Length: 283.6 km (176.2 mi)

History
- Established: 1920
- Current shape: 27 March 2007
- Treaties: Latvian–Soviet Peace Treaty (1920)

Latvian and Russian boundary markers

The Latvia–Russia border is the state border between Republic of Latvia (EU member) and the Russian Federation (CIS member). The length of the border is 283.6 kilometres (176.2 mi). Since 2004, it has been an eastern part of external border of the European Union, Schengen Area and NATO.

== History ==
The Pskov region and Latvia have had historical ties since the founding of the Pskov Republic in the 13th century. From 1925 to 1945 Abrene County was part of the Republic of Latvia. Following the Soviet occupation, on 16 January 1945 the area was transferred from the Latvian Soviet Socialist Republic to Pskov Oblast and renamed Pytalovsky District. After regaining independence in 1991, Latvia initially claimed the previous Latvian territory, on the basis of the 1920 Latvian–Soviet Peace Treaty. The delimitation of the border was completed in 1998, but the treaty on the state border was signed and ratified only on 27 March 2007. It recognised the Pytalovsky District as part of Russia.

As a result of the 2023 Wagner Group rebellion, Latvia immediately sealed its borders from Russia in response to the mutiny until further notice.

At the end of 2025, Latvia completed the construction of a 280km fence along the Latvia-Russia border. However border infrastructure construction continued in 2026.

== Overview ==
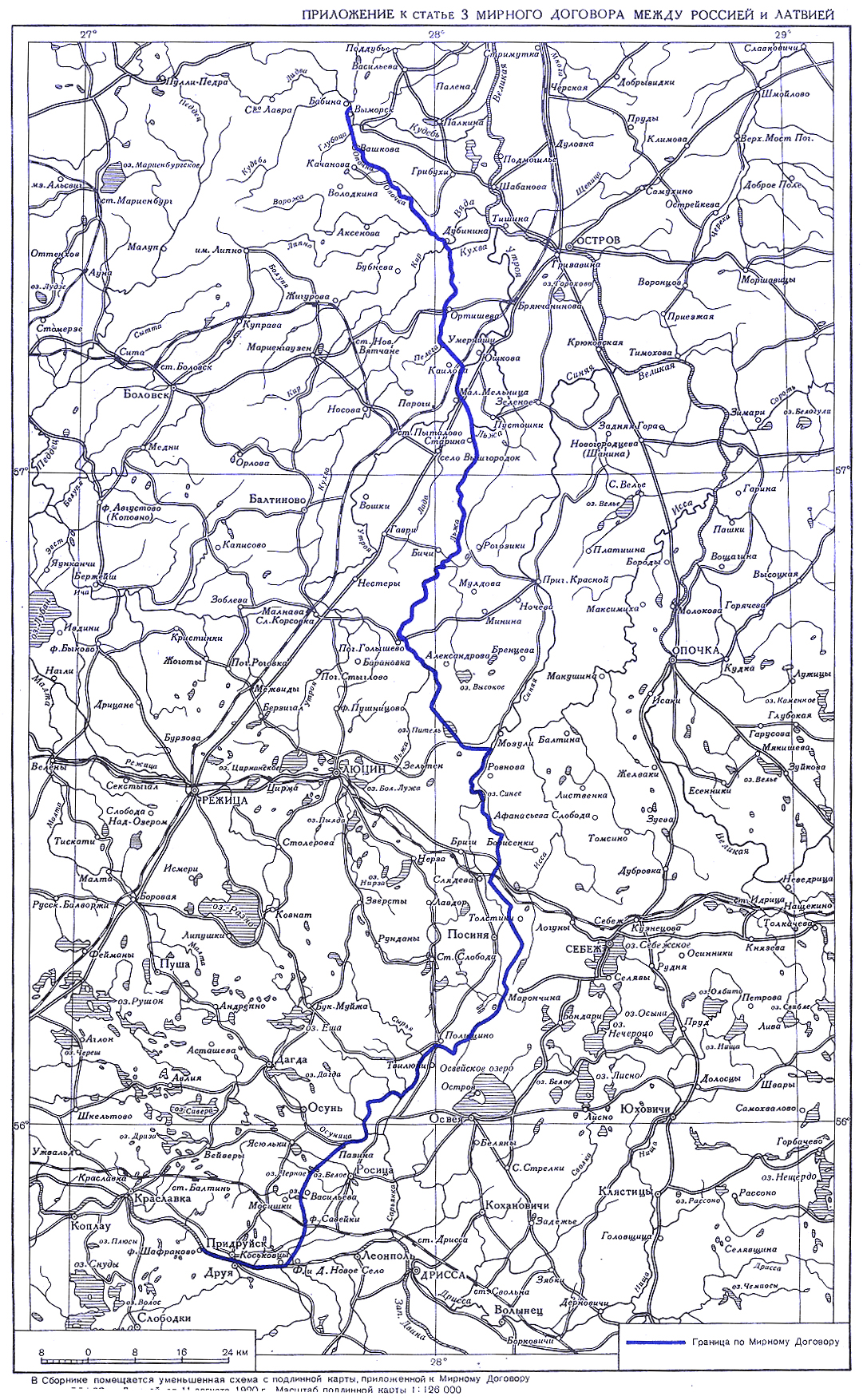
Appendix to Article 3 of the Latvian–Soviet Peace Treaty 1920

According to the 2007 agreement on the Russian-Latvian State Border, the state border between Latvia and Russia starting from the intersection point of the state borders of Latvia, Russia and Belarus, and ends with the joint borders of Latvia, Russia and Estonia.

Latvia borders only one oblast of Russia, the Pskov Oblast. Russia borders three Latvian municipalities.

The access-restricted Border Security Zone of Russia lies along the border on the Russian side. In order to visit this zone, a permit issued by the local FSB department is required (the only exceptions are international border transit points).

== Border crossings ==
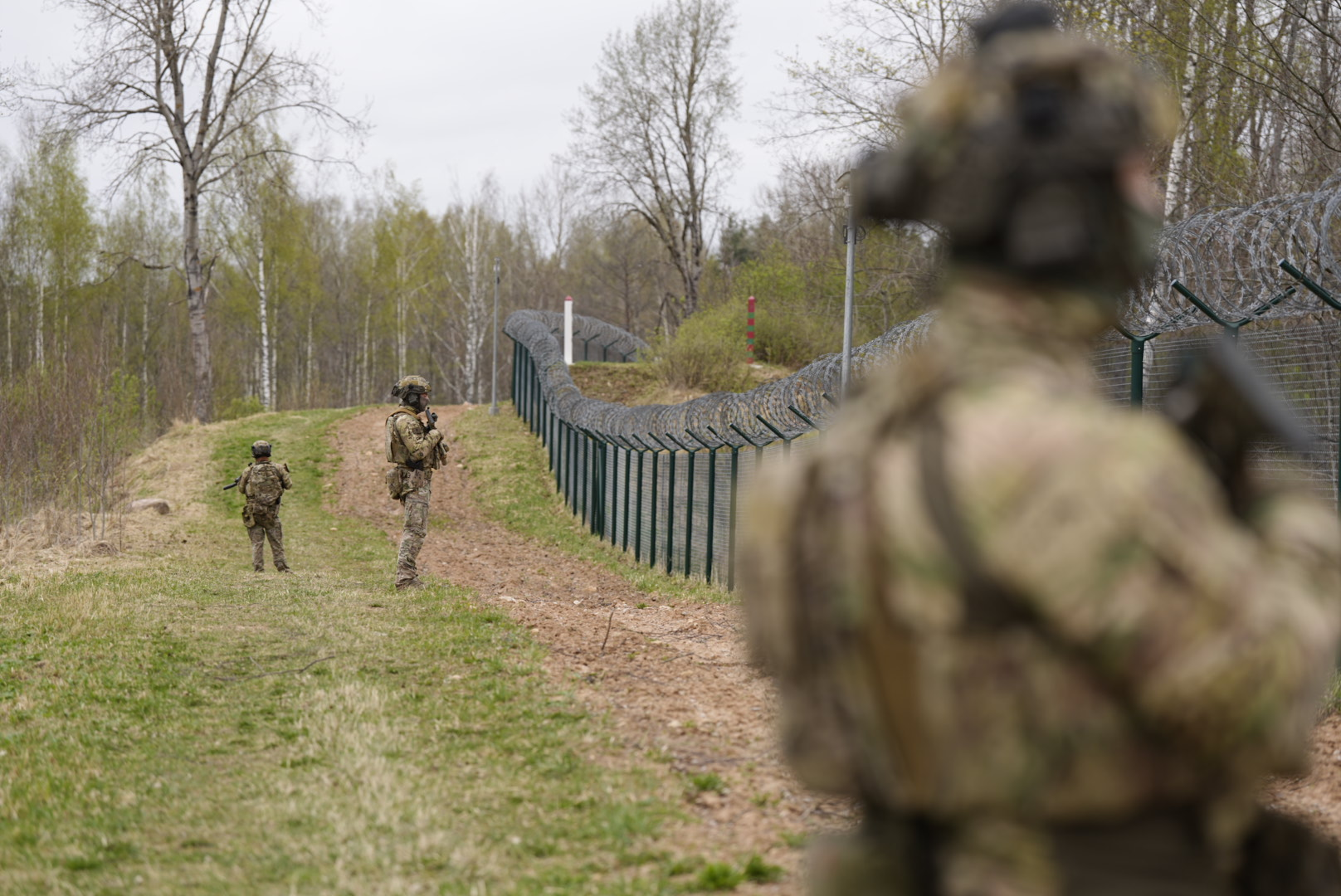
A tall metal fence at the border.

Crossing the border is allowed only at border controls. Most people need a visa on one or both sides of the border. Listed from north:

- road P42 near Pededze (Pededze — Brunishevo; closed since autumn 2022 until further notice)
- road P35 near Viļaka (Vientuļi — Ludonka; closed since autumn 2022 until further notice)
- railway Rēzekne–Pskov (Saint Petersburg–Warsaw Railway) near Kārsava (not used as of 2024 due to the absence of cross-border railway traffic)
- road E262 / A13 / A116 near Kārsava and Grebņeva (Grebņeva — Ubylinka)
- road P50 near Kārsava and Goliševa (closed indefinitely)
- railway Rēzekne–Velikiye Luki (Moscow–Riga Railway) near Zilupe (not used as of 2024 due to the absence of cross-border railway traffic)
- road E22 / A12 / M9 near Zilupe and Terehova, Latvia (Terehova — Burachki)

Border crossings can also be done by air travel. The only international airport in Latvia is Riga International Airport which, prior to February 2022, used to have scheduled flights among other places to Moscow and Saint Petersburg. The airports at Daugavpils, Liepāja, Jūrmala-Tukuma and Ventspils are also registered as border crossing points, although not used for regular international flights.

Following the mobilization announced in Russia related to the 2022 Russian invasion of Ukraine in September, Latvia declared state emergency for three months in border counties and closed the Pededze crossing.

== See also ==
- Baltic Defence Line
- Masļenki border incident
