= Juris Maklakovs =

Latvian general

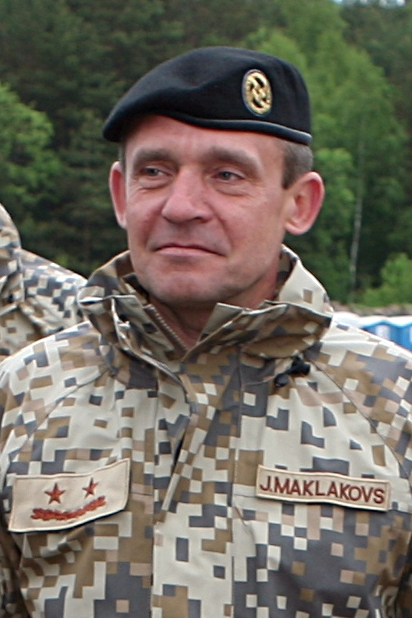
- Juris Maklakovs in 2010
- Born: 27 October 1964 (age 61); Ņukši Parish, Latvian SSR, Soviet Union
- Allegiance: Soviet Union (1985–1991); Latvia (1991–present)
- Branch: Soviet Air Forces; Latvian Air Force
- Rank: Major General
- Commands: Commander of the Joint Headquarters

Major General Juris Maklakovs is a Latvian former general, who served as the Commander of the Joint Headquarters for a four year term from 6 July 2006-6 July 2010.

== Soviet Air Force ==
Born in Ņukši Parish in 1964, he entered the Kaliningrad Secondary Military Aviation Technician School in 1982, graduating in 1985. A radio technician of the Soviet Air Forces, he was the head of the radio technical equipment crew group from 1987. From 1988 to 1992, he studied at the Zhukovsky Air Force Engineering Academy in Moscow.

== Latvian military service ==
With the establishment of the National Defence Academy in 1993, he became the leading engineer-programmer of its Computing Centre. That same year, he became a lecturer at the Department of Combat Application of Weapon Types and Engineering Sciences and from 1995, he was the head of the Department of Engineering Sciences. From 1997 to 2001, he was the vice-rector for educational work of the National Defence Academy before becoming rector in 2001. In 2004, he graduated from the United States Army War College. From 2004 to 2006, he was the Commander of the Latvian Air Force .

From 2006, he was the Commander of the Latvian National Armed Forces. In 2008 he was promoted to Major General. In 2010, when Raimonds Graubis was appointed as the new army commander, he decided not to continue his service in the NAF. In July 2010 he was retired from service.

== Civilian career ==
From January 2011 to 2015, he was the Ambassador of Latvia to Kazakhstan and Kyrgyzstan. From 2015 to 2019, he was the Ambassador of Latvia to Azerbaijan. He now serves as a lecturer at the Transport and Telecommunication Institute.

== Awards ==
- Order of Viesturs
- President's Gratitude
- Honorary Badge of Recognition
- Award "For Contribution to the Development of the Armed Forces"
- Breast Badge
