= Mežvidi Parish =

Parish of Latvia

- parish of Latvia
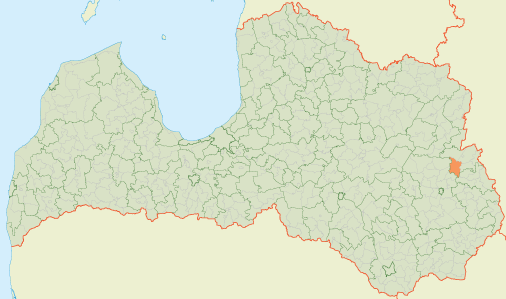
- Coordinates: 56°41′57″N 27°33′55″E
- Country: Latvia

Population (1 January 2026)
  - Total: 641

Mežvidi Parish (Latvian: Mežvidu pagasts) is an administrative unit of Ludza Municipality in the Latgale region of Latvia.

== Towns, villages and settlements of Mežvidi Parish ==
- Mežvidi (Kārsava Municipality), Latvia – parish administrative center
