= Cirma Parish =

Parish of Latvia

- parish of Latvia
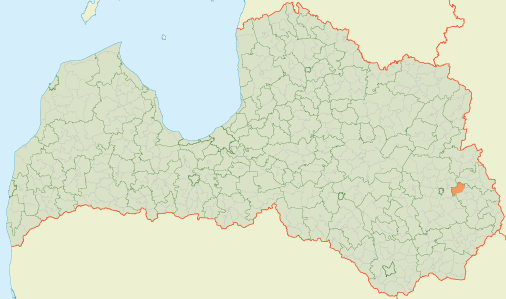
- Coordinates: 56°31′16″N 27°35′19″E
- Country: Latvia

Population (1 January 2026)
  - Total: 551

Cirma Parish (Latvian: Cirmas pagasts) is an administrative unit of Ludza Municipality, Latvia.
