= Nirza Parish =

Parish of Latvia

- parish of Latvia
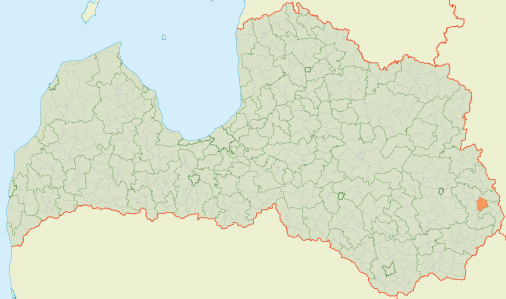
- Coordinates: 56°23′21″N 27°55′15″E
- Country: Latvia

Population (1 January 2026)
  - Total: 282

Nirza Parish (Latvian: Nirzas pagasts) is an administrative unit of Ludza Municipality, Latvia. The Ludza dialect used to be spoken in Nirza
