= Pureņi Parish =

Parish of Latvia

- parish of Latvia
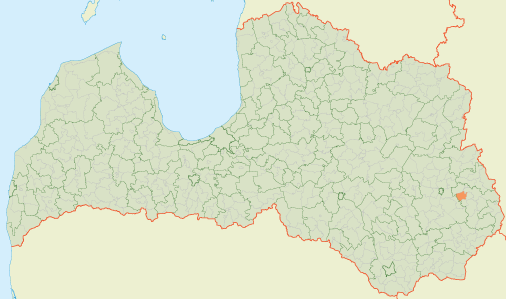
- Coordinates: 56°27′44″N 27°38′03″E
- Country: Latvia

Population (1 January 2026)
  - Total: 233

Pureņi Parish (Latvian: Pureņu pagasts) is an administrative unit of Ludza Municipality, Latvia.
