= Isnauda Parish =

Parish of Latvia

- parish of Latvia
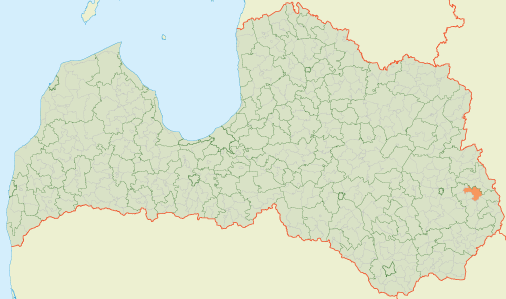
- Coordinates: 56°29′05″N 27°48′59″E
- Country: Latvia

Population (1 January 2026)
  - Total: 792
- Time zone: Eastern European Time

Isnauda Parish (Latvian: Isnaudas pagasts) is an administrative unit of Ludza Municipality, Latvia.
