= Salnava Parish =

Parish of Latvia

- parish of Latvia
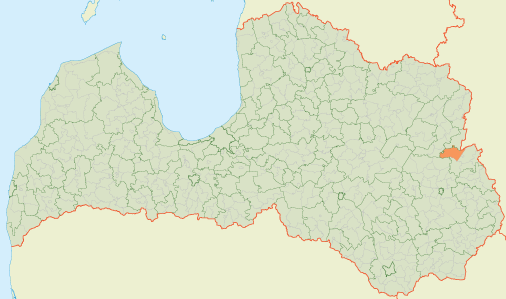
- Coordinates: 56°48′44″N 27°31′52″E
- Country: Latvia

Population (1 January 2026)
  - Total: 533

Salnava Parish (Latvian: Salnavas pagasts) is an administrative unit of Ludza Municipality in the Latgale region of Latvia. Prior to the 2009 administrative reforms it was part of the former Ludza district.

== Towns, villages and settlements of Salnava parish ==
- Salnava - parish administrative center
