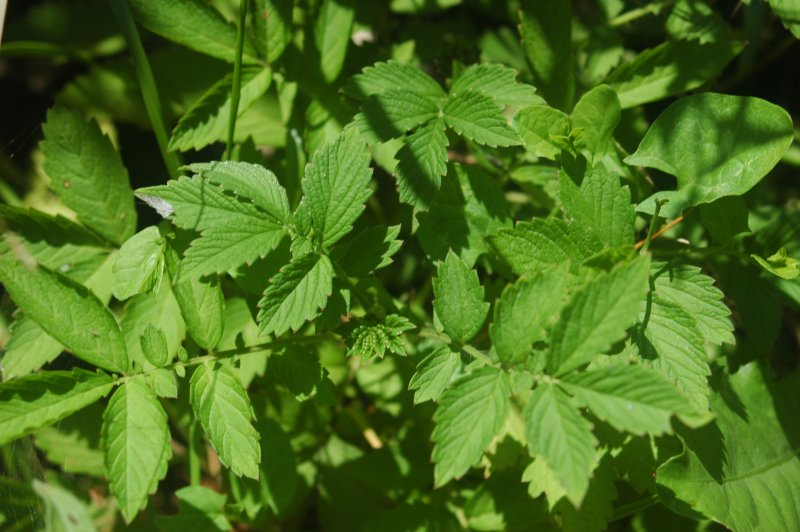

Scientific classification
- Kingdom: Plantae
- Clade: Embryophytes
- Clade: Tracheophytes
- Clade: Spermatophytes
- Clade: Angiosperms
- Clade: Eudicots
- Clade: Rosids
- Order: Rosales
- Family: Rosaceae
- Genus: Agrimonia
- Species: A. pilosa

Binomial name
- Agrimonia pilosa Ledeb.

= Agrimonia pilosa =

Species of plant

Agrimonia pilosa also known as hairy agrimony, is a flowering plant in the family Rosaceae. It is distributed primarily over the Korean Peninsula, Japan, China, Siberia, and Eastern Europe.

== Description ==
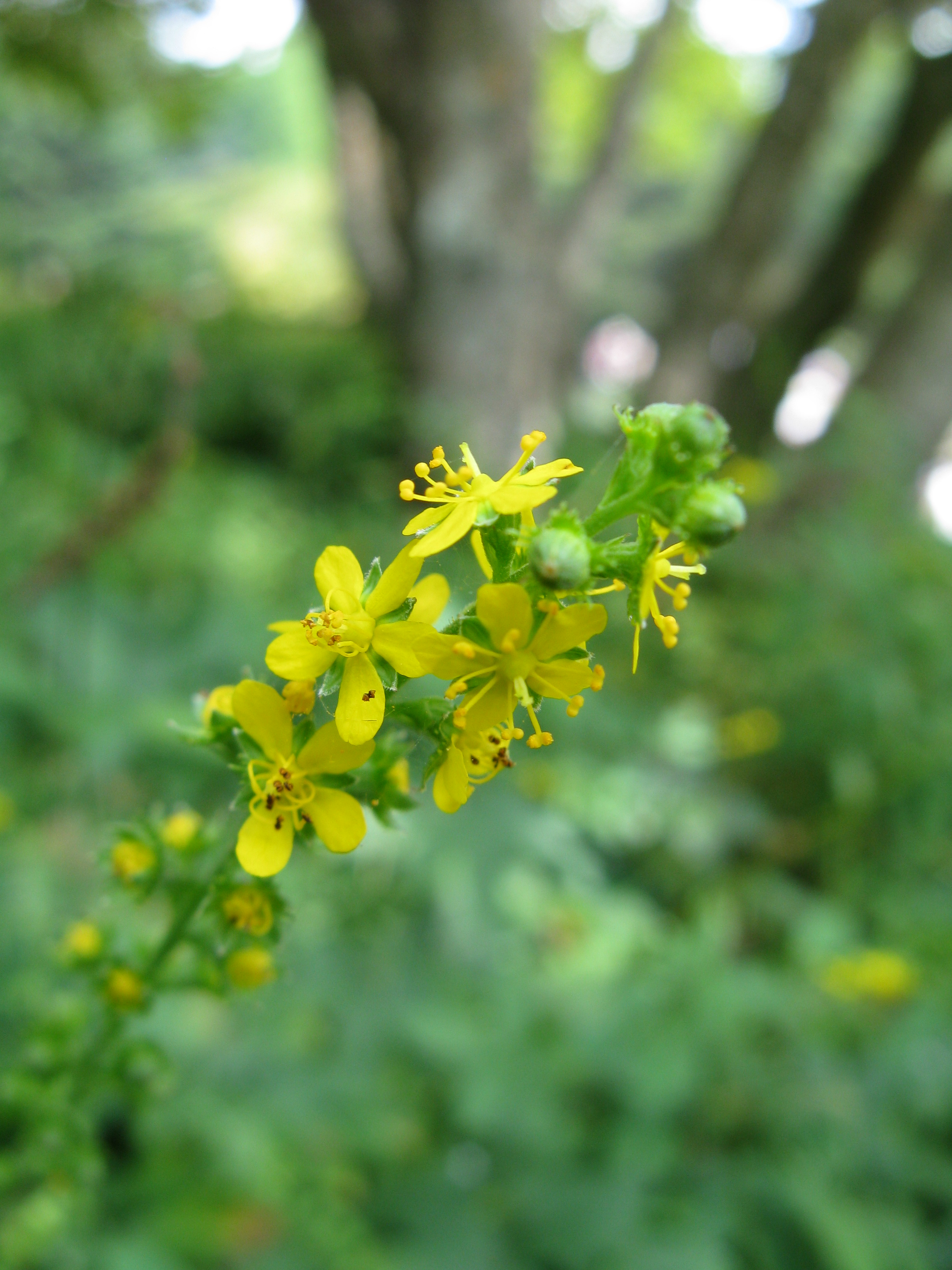
Flowers

Agrimonia pilosa is a perennial herb with erect stem growing 30–120 cm (12–47 in) in height. It grows along roadsides or in grassy areas at diverse altitudes. It can grow in light sandy, loamy, or heavy soils. Its suitable pH for growing properly is acid or basic alkaline soils.

It has many lateral roots and its rhizome is short and usually tuberous. Its stems are colored yellowish green or green and its upper part is sparsely pubescent and pilose, but the lower part had dense hairs. Its leaves are green, alternate and odd-pinnate with two to four pairs of leaflets. The number of leaflets reduces to three on upper leaves. The leaves are oval and edged with pointy teeth of similar size. The leaves are 3–6 cm (1.2–2.4 in) long and 1.5–3.5 cm (0.59–1.38 in) wide, and they are hairy on both sides.

== Chemical constituents ==
Agrimonia pilosa contains certain chemical components such as agrimonolide, Agrimol B, coumarin, tannins, as well as flavonoids, phenylpropanoids, and triterpenes.

== Traditional medicine ==
Agrimonia pilosa is traditionally used in Korea for boils, eczema, and taeniasis (a tape worm condition). In Nepal and China, A. pilosa is traditionally used for abdominal pain, sore throat, headaches, and heat stroke.
