= Sadurski =

Sadurski feminine: Sadurska is a Polish-language surname.

- Anna Sadurska
- Franciszek Sadurski, Polish World War II fighter, politician, MP
- Kateryna Sadurska
- Małgorzata Sadurska
- Szczepan Sadurski polish satirist, cartoonist, caricaturist, journalist
- Wojciech Sadurski, (born 5 June 1950) is a Polish and Australian scholar of constitutional law.
