= Pasiene =

Center of Pasiene Parish, Ludza Municipality, Latvia

Coordinates: 56°17′N 28°10′E

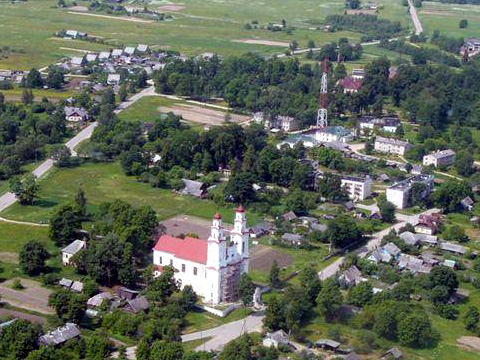
Pasiene village, with the catholic church visible

Pasiene (Latgalian: Pasīne/Posīne) is a settlement in Pasiene Parish, Ludza Municipality in the Latgale region of Latvia. It is the easternmost point of Latvia and the easternmost point of the contiguous part of the Baltic states.

As of February 2022, the settlement has a population of 267. Although Pasiene is a small village, it is known for its Baroque-style Roman Catholic church dating from 1761. There also used to be a Dominican abbey in Pasiene, close to the church, but it burnt down in 1837.
