= Mērdzene Parish =

Parish in Ludza Municipality, Latvia

- parish of Latvia
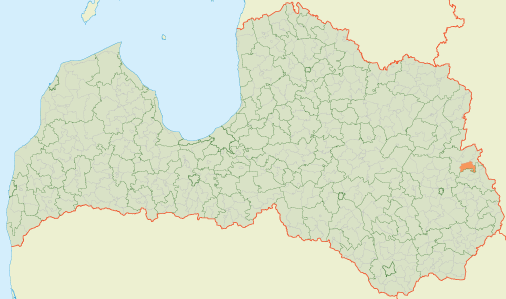
- Coordinates: 56°41′48″N 27°45′03″E
- Country: Latvia

Population (1 January 2026)
  - Total: 519

Mērdzene Parish (Latvian: Mērdzenes pagasts) is an administrative unit of Ludza Municipality in the Latgale region of Latvia.

== Towns, villages and settlements of Mērdzene Parish ==
- Mērdzene – parish administrative center.
