= Brazilian Academy of Philosophy =

The Brazilian Academy of Philosophy is a private nonprofit institution based in Rio de Janeiro. Its objectives are to promote philosophical creation in Brazil and preserve the country's philosophical heritage by coordinating congresses, editing books, and supporting research in Philosophy. It was established in 1989 by a group of Brazilian intellectuals.

== Founders ==
- Antonio Paim
- José Guilherme Merquior
- Miguel Reale
- Emmanuel Leão
- Paulo Mercadante
- Ricardo Vélez Rodríguez
- Stanislavs Ladusãns
