= Hülsen =

Hülsen is a German surname. Notable people with the surname include:

- August Ludwig Hülsen (1765–1809), philosopher
- Dietrich von Hülsen-Haeseler (1852–1908), general
- Christian Hülsen (1858–1935), historian
- Bernhard von Hülsen (1865–1950), general
- Hans von Hülsen (1890–1969), writer
- Johann Dietrich von Hülsen, (1693–1767), Prussian general during the Seven Years' War
