= Goliševa Parish =

Parish of Latvia

- parish of Latvia
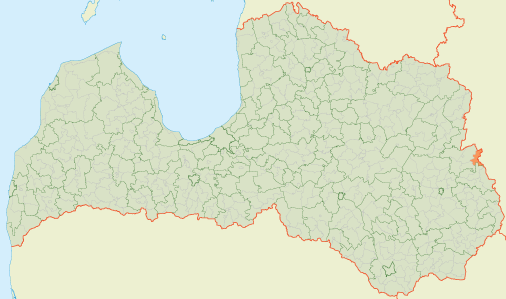
- Coordinates: 56°45′46″N 27°53′31″E
- Country: Latvia

Population (1 January 2026)
  - Total: 285

Goliševa Parish (Latvian: Goliševas pagasts) is an administrative unit of Ludza Municipality in the Latgale region of Latvia. Prior to the 2009 administrative reforms it was part of the former Ludza district.
