= Zvirgzdene Parish =

Parish of Latvia

- parish of Latvia
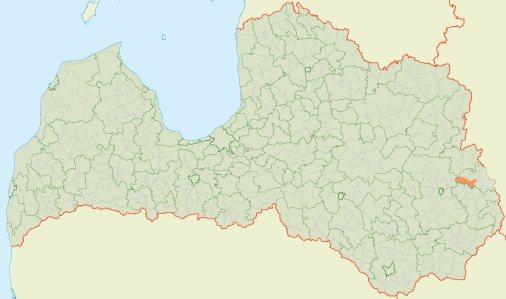
- 56°34′34″N 27°42′47″E
- Country: Latvia

Area
  - Total: 98.86 km^{2} (38.17 sq mi)
  - Land: 87.42 km^{2} (33.75 sq mi)
  - Water: 11.44 km^{2} (4.42 sq mi)

Population (1 January 2025)
  - Total: 544
  - Density: 6.22/km^{2} (16.1/sq mi)

Zvirgzdene Parish (Latvian: Zvirgzdenes pagasts) is an administrative unit of Ludza Municipality in the Latgale region of Latvia.
