= Istra Parish =

Parish of Latvia

- parish of Latvia
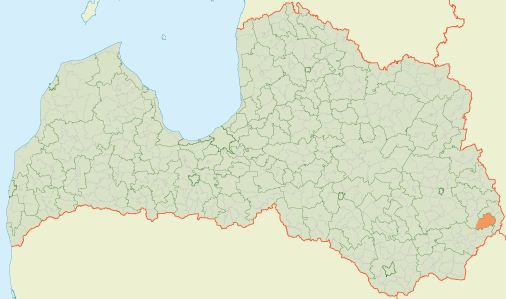
- Coordinates: 56°14′38″N 27°58′00″E
- Country: Latvia

Population (1 January 2026)
  - Total: 371

Istra Parish (Latvian: Istras pagasts) is an administrative territorial entity of Ludza Municipality, Latvia.
