= Ņukši Parish =

Parish of Latvia

- parish of Latvia
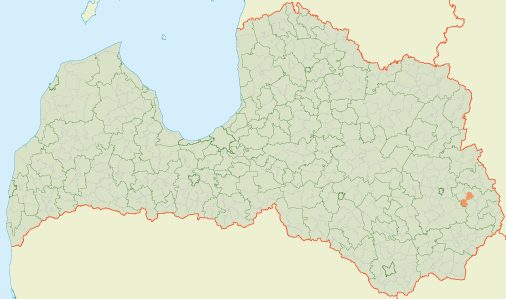
- Coordinates: 56°25′59″N 27°42′38″E
- Country: Latvia

Population (1 January 2026)
  - Total: 357

Ņukši Parish (Latvian: Ņukšu pagasts) was an administrative territorial entity of Ludza Municipality, Latvia.
