= Blonti Parish =

Parish of Latvia

- parish of Latvia
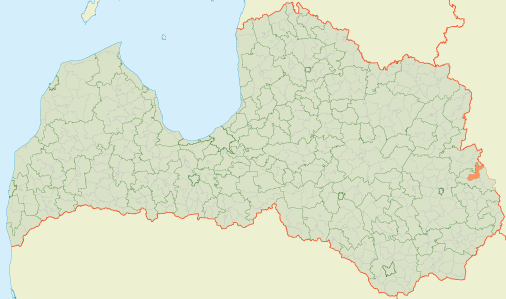
- 56°38′32″N 27°51′35″E
- Country: Latvia

Area
  - Total: 96.60 km^{2} (37.30 sq mi)
  - Land: 93.12 km^{2} (35.95 sq mi)
  - Water: 3.48 km^{2} (1.34 sq mi)

Population (1 January 2024)
  - Total: 347
  - Density: 3.6/km^{2} (9.3/sq mi)

Blonti Parish (Latvian: Blontu pagasts) is an administrative unit of Ludza Municipality in the Latgale region of Latvia.
