= Brazilian Institute of Philosophy =

Instituto Brasileiro de Filosofia
- Abbreviation: IBF
- Formation: August, 1949
- Founder: Miguel Reale
- Type: Private nonprofit organization
- Headquarters: Av. 9 de Julho, nº 3147, 6º andar, Jardim Paulista
- Location: São Paulo, Brazil
- Main organ: Revista Brasileira de Filosofia
- Website: https://ibfilo.org.br/

The Brazilian Institute of Philosophy (Portuguese: Instituto Brasileiro de Filosofia, IBF) is a private cultural institution based in São Paulo, Brazil.

Founded in 1949 by the jurist and philosopher Miguel Reale, the Institute made contributions to the development of philosophy in Brazil, especially to the fields of legal theory, metaphysics, logic, and the philosophy of science. Among its members and collaborators were Vilém Flusser, Vicente Ferreira da Silva, Newton da Costa, Romano Galeffi, and Pontes de Miranda.
