= Kārsava =

Town in Krāslava Municipality, Latvia

- Town
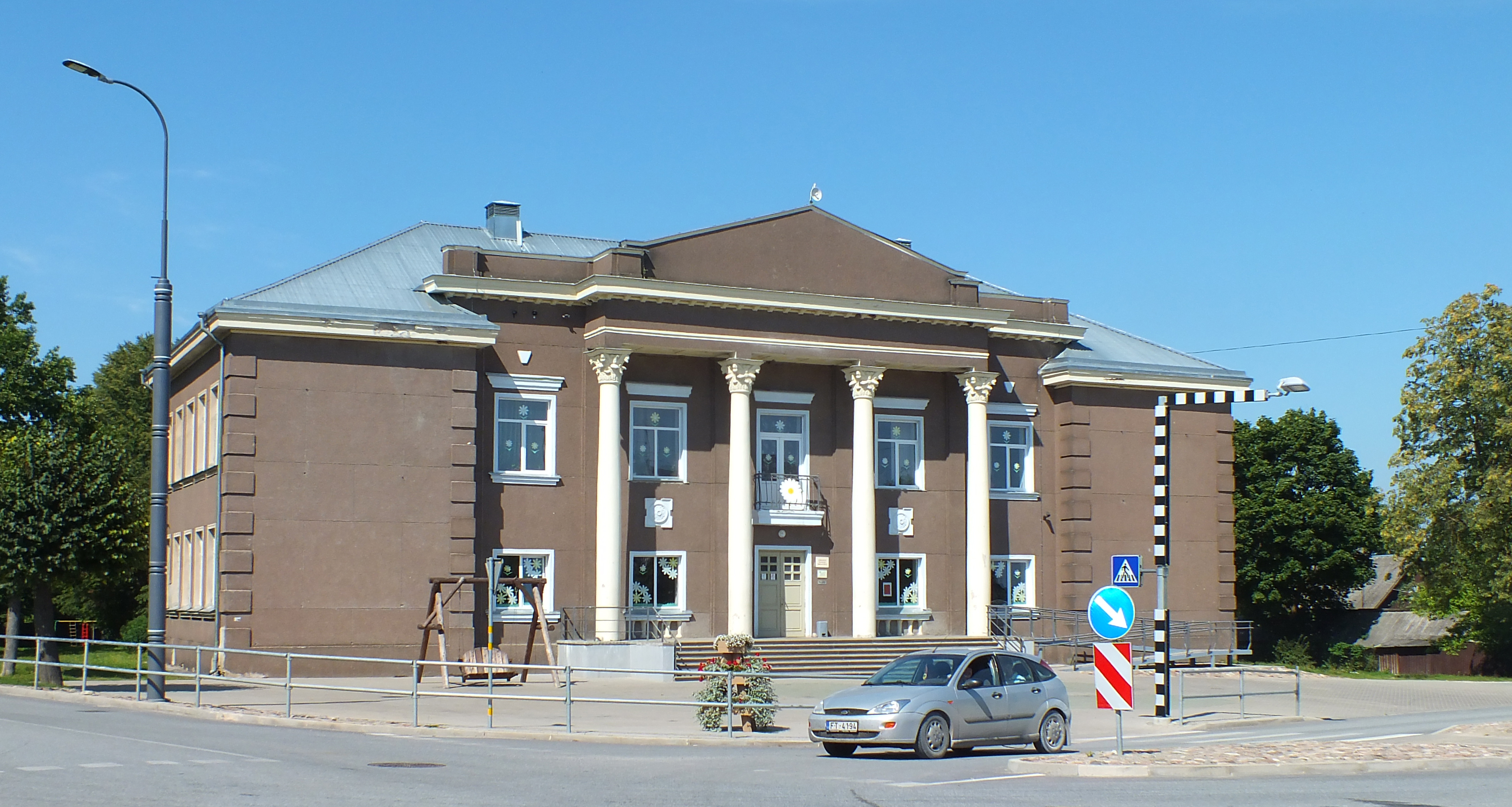
- Cultural centre in Kārsava

- Coat of arms

- Location in Latvia
- Coordinates: 56°47′N 27°40′E
- Country: Latvia
- Municipality: Ludza Municipality
- Town rights: 1928

Area
  - Total: 4.07 km^{2} (1.57 sq mi)
  - Land: 3.98 km^{2} (1.54 sq mi)
  - Water: 0.09 km^{2} (0.035 sq mi)

Population (2026)
  - Total: 1,799
  - Density: 452/km^{2} (1,170/sq mi)
- Time zone: UTC+2 (EET)
  - Summer (DST): UTC+3 (EEST)
- Postal code: LV-5717
- Calling code: +371 657
- Website: http://www.karsava.lv/

Kārsava (German: Karsau, Russian: Корсовка, Korsovka, Polish: Korsówka, Yiddish: קאָרסאָװקע, Korsovke) is a town in Ludza Municipality in the Latgale region of Latvia, near the border of Russia.

The ancient Baltic tribe Latgalians inhabited the territory of Kārsava since the 8th century. There are several hillforts near town.

In 1763 a Catholic church was built in Kārsava. The town was located near the Rēzekne-Ostrov postal road and it saw rapid development when the St. Petersburg-Vilnius railway line was constructed nearby and the town became a trading centre.

In 1935, on the eve of World War II, the population of Kārsava was 2,181, 37% of whom were Jewish. The vast majority of them were murdered during the Holocaust.

== See also ==
- List of cities in Latvia
