= Ludza Municipality =

Municipality of Latvia

Ludza Municipality Ludzas novads
- Municipality
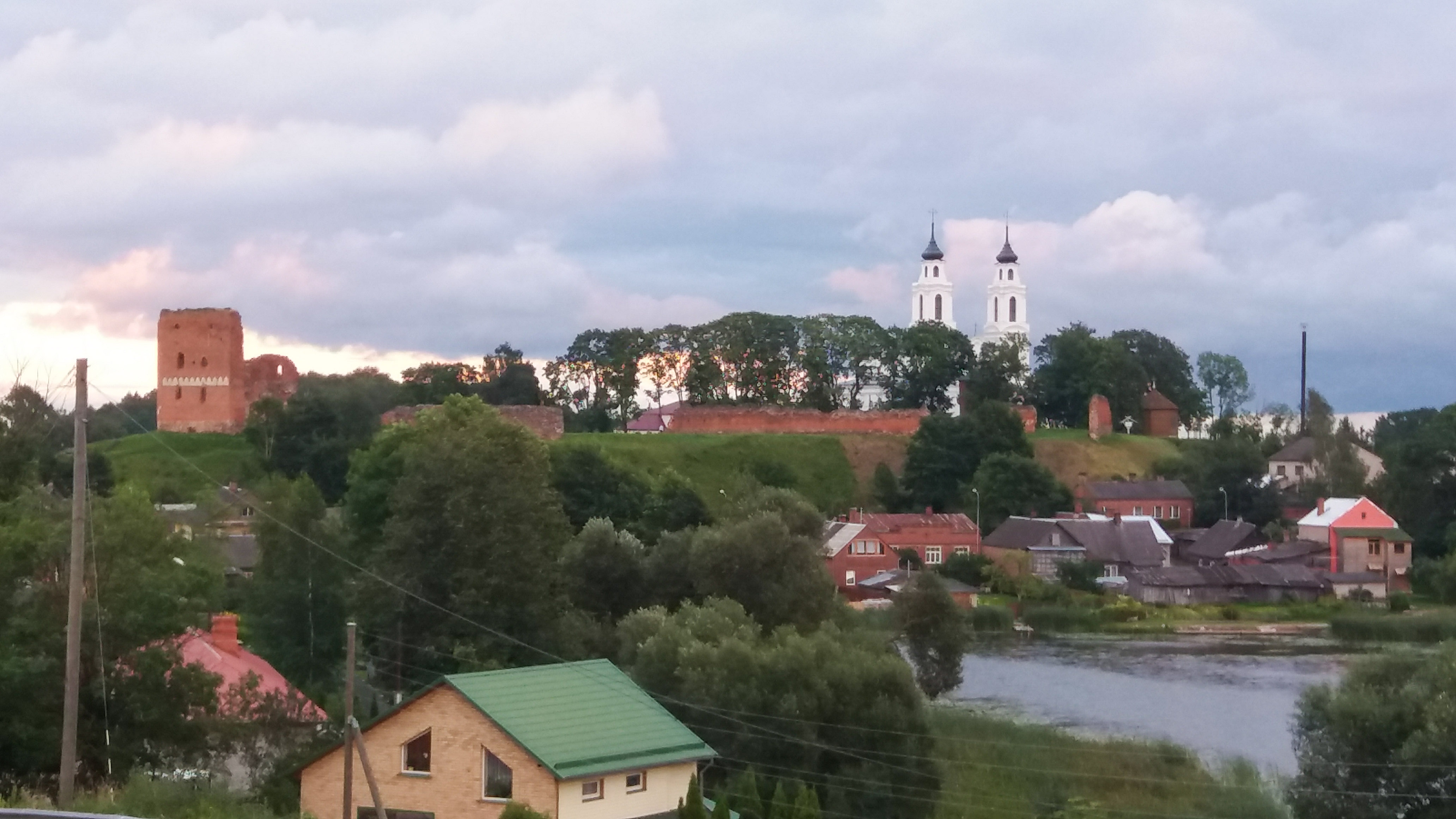

- Flag Coat of arms

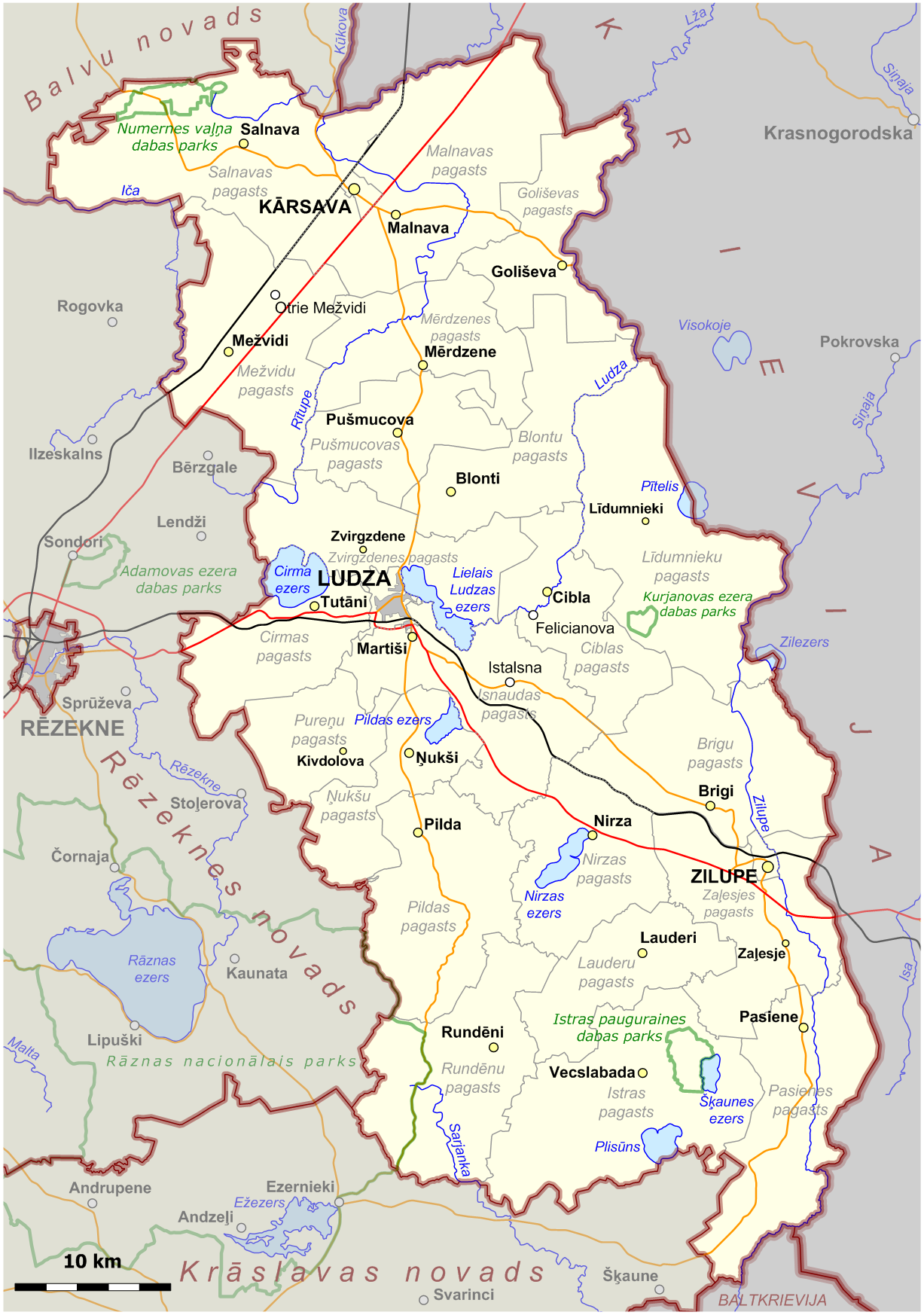
- Coordinates: 56°33′N 27°43′E
- Country: Latvia
- Formed: 2009
- Reformed: 2021
- Centre: Ludza

Government
  - Council Chair: Edgars Mekšs (LZS)

Area
  - Total: 2,411.36 km^{2} (931.03 sq mi)
  - Land: 2,302.54 km^{2} (889.02 sq mi)

Population (2026)
  - Total: 19,659
  - Density: 8.5380/km^{2} (22.113/sq mi)
- Website: www.ludza.lv

Ludza Municipality (Latvian: Ludzas novads, Latgalian: Ludzys nūvods) is a municipality in Latgale, Latvia. The administrative centre is Ludza. The municipality was formed in 2009 by merging Briģi Parish, Cirma Parish, Isnauda Parish, Istra Parish, Nirza Parish, Ņukši Parish, Pilda Parish, Pureņi Parish, Rundēni Parish and Ludza town of the former Ludza district.

During the 2021 Latvian administrative reform, the previous municipality was merged with Cibla Municipality, Kārsava Municipality and Zilupe Municipality. The new municipality now fully corresponds with the area of the former Ludza district.

The municipality is located 267 km from the capital of Latvia - Riga, by the Latvian-Russian border, i.e. by the border of the European Union with the Russian Federation.

The territory of the municipality is crossed by the internationally important Riga-Moscow road and by the Riga-Zilupe-Moscow railway.

== Population ==
Territorial unit	Population (year)
Briģi Parish	553 (2018)
Cirma Parish	647 (2018)
Isnauda Parish	1022 (2018)
Istra Parish	532 (2018)
Ludza	8344(2018)
Nirza Parish	378 (2018)
Ņukši Parish	416 (2018)
Pilda Parish	568 (2018)
Pureņi Parish	337 (2018)
Rundēni Parish	429 (2018)

== Notable people ==
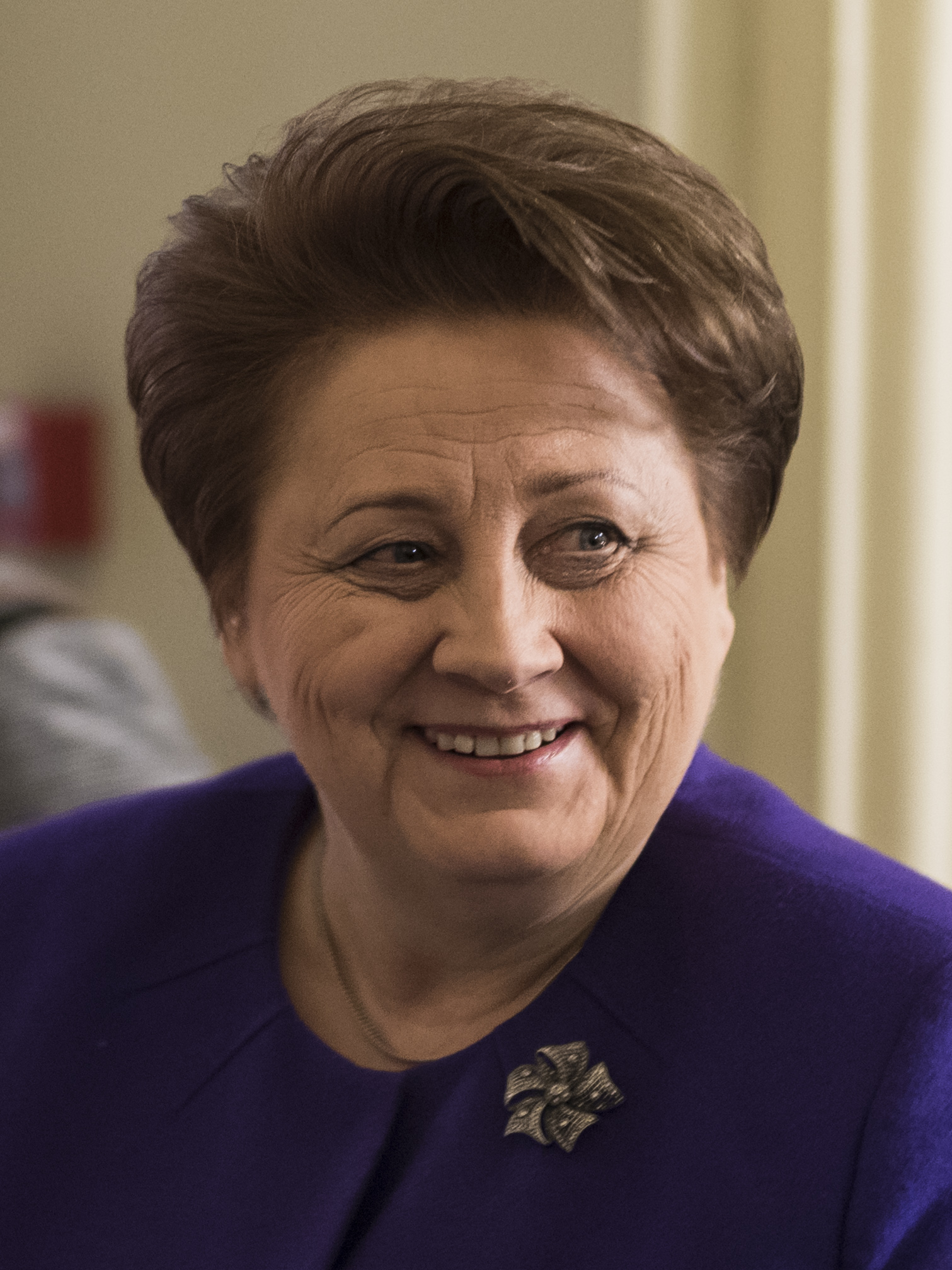
Laimdota Straujuma, 2016

- Nikolai Zaremba (1821 in Ozupiene estate – 1879), a Russian musical theorist, teacher and composer; taught Pyotr Ilyich Tchaikovsky
- William Robyn (1894 in Pasiene – 1996), stage name of William Robinow, an American tenor who toured the vaudeville circuit
- Stanislavs Ladusãns (1912 in Zvirgzdene Parish - 1993), Jesuit priest, professor of philosophy, lived in Brazil
- Rolands Kalniņš (1922 in Istra Parish – 2022), film director, screenwriter and producer
- Aleksandrs Gerasimjonoks (1933 – 2019), Soviet sports shooter, competed in the 1964 Summer Olympics
- Anatolijs Gorbunovs (born 1942 in Pilda Parish), politician, Chairman of the Supreme Soviet to 1990, then Chairman of the Supreme Council of Latvia; effectively the acting head of state until 1993
- Jānis Bulis (born 1950 in Briģi Parish), Catholic bishop of the Diocese of Rēzekne-Aglona.
- Laimdota Straujuma (born 1951 in Mežvidi Parish), economist and politician; 21st. prime minister of Latvia, 2014 to 2016.
- Juris Maklakovs (born 1964 in Ņukši Parish}, Latvia Major General, 2006 - 2010.

== See also ==
- Administrative divisions of Latvia
- Ludza
- Ludza dialect
