= Visa policy of Russia =

Policy on permits required to enter Russia and the occupied territories of Ukraine

The visa policy of Russia deals with the requirements of foreign nationals to enter Russia.

Despite international sanctions during the Russian invasion of Ukraine, Russia continues to issue visas to citizens of all countries. A summary of visa requirements for citizens of each country is available online in Russian.

Russia exempts citizens from many countries from obtaining a visa, although an Electronic Travel Authorization with a QR code from the Gosuslugi mobile app is required in these cases. If a visa is required, depending on country of origin, some people may obtain an electronic visa (e-Visa); while others must apply for a visa at a diplomatic mission of Russia or visa center. A holder of a visa to enter Belarus may also enter Russia with such visa; however, this policy does not apply to Belarusian e-visas.

Types of visas available for issuance include private, business, tourist, educational, working, transit, humanitarian, service, and diplomatic. The length and terms of visas depend on the nationality of the recipient and other personal circumstances. Multi-year tourist visas are available to citizens of the United States (3-year visa, 6 months per visit with an unlimited number of visits) and the European Union (5-year visa).

The Russian visa is a machine-readable document that is stickered to a page in the holder's passport. It includes characters in both the cyrillic script and Latin alphabet.

To apply for a visa, a passport, a passport photo, a tourist invitation letter (can be purchased online), and a printed completed application form are required.

At any border crossing, foreigners may be questioned, have their biometrics taken, including fingerprints and photos, and are subject to search of baggage and mobile phone content, including contact lists, correspondence, and posts on social media. Officers focus on contact with Ukrainians, and any opinions on politics and the Russo-Ukrainian war.

Transporting any amount of currency of countries in the European Union (EU), including Euros, directly to Russia from EU countries such as Estonia and Latvia is prohibited by the EU.

Crimea is under de facto Russian control and the visa policy of Russia applies for travel to Crimea. Donetsk, Kharkiv, Kherson, Luhansk, and Zaporizhzhia are internationally recognized as part of Ukraine, and, although they are at least partially or sometimes controlled by Russia, the visa policy of Ukraine applies to travel to these regions.

Upon entering Russia, a visitor will receive a migration paper; this paper must be returned upon leaving the country or a fine must be paid. Replacements can be obtained from the police.

If a visitor who requires a visa loses their passport while in Russia, the Ministry of Foreign Affairs can issue a Return-Home certificate after receipt of a letter from the embassy of such visitor; otherwise, the visitor must apply for an exit visa. Staying in Russia past the expiration date of a visa requires a court decision for deportation.

== Visa policy map ==
Visa policy of Russia The Russian Federation Freedom of movement Visa not required (90 days) Visa not required (60 days) Visa not required (30 days) Visa not required with some conditions (30 for tourist purposes or 90 days for business purposes) / eVisa (30 days) Visa not required for tour groups (15 days) / eVisa (30 days) Visa not required (14 days) eVisa (30 days) Visa required Admission restricted

== Holders of ordinary passports ==
=== Visa-exempt countries ===
Citizens of the following countries and territories may enter Russia without a visa for stays up to the duration listed below.

Citizens who are exempt from obtaining a visa must obtain an Electronic Travel Authorization with a QR code from the Gosuslugi mobile app. They may not reset the allowed period of stay by leaving and re-entering the country.

Countries whose citizens are visa-exempt may only stay for up to 90 days within a calendar year (unless otherwise stipulated by an international agreement or Russian legislation).

Permanent regime:

Freedom of movement

- Belarus
- South Ossetia^{IP}

90 days

- Abkhazia^{IP}
- Andorra^{2}
- Antigua and Barbuda^{1}
- Argentina^{1}
- Armenia
- Azerbaijan
- Belize^{1}
- Bolivia^{1}
- Brazil^{1}
- Chile^{1}
- Colombia^{1}
- Costa Rica^{1}
- Cuba^{1}
- Dominica^{1}
- Ecuador^{1}
- El Salvador^{1}
- Estonia (Note: Holders of an alien passport only.)
- Fiji
- Georgia
- Grenada^{1}
- Guatemala^{1}
- Guyana^{1}
- Honduras^{1}
- Israel^{1}
- Jamaica^{3}
- Kazakhstan^{ID^{KZ}}
- Kyrgyzstan^{ID}
- Latvia (Note: Holders of a non-citizen passport only.)
- Maldives
- Moldova
- Namibia^{1}
- Nicaragua^{1}
- Panama^{1}
- Paraguay^{1}
- Peru^{1}
- Qatar^{1}
- Saint Kitts and Nevis^{1}
- Saint Vincent and the Grenadines^{1}
- Saudi Arabia
- South Africa
- Suriname^{1}
- Tajikistan
- Ukraine^{ID} (Note: Citizens of Ukraine must arrive only through Sheremetyevo International Airport (Moscow).) (Note: Citizens of Ukraine could be subject to interrogation by the Federal Security Service upon entering Russia.)
- United Arab Emirates^{1}
- Uruguay^{1}
- Uzbekistan
- Vanuatu
- Venezuela^{1}

60 days

- Cape Verde
- Dominican Republic^{4}
- Mauritius^{1}
- Samoa
- South Korea^{1}

30 days

- Bosnia and Herzegovina^{5}
- Botswana^{1}
- Jordan
- Laos^{1}
- Macau (Note: For Chinese citizens with People's Republic of China passports, Hong Kong Special Administrative Region passports or Macao Special Administrative Region passports only.)
- Mongolia^{1}
- Montenegro (until 30 December 2026)
- Myanmar
- North Macedonia^{6} (Note: Must hold a letter of guarantee / invitation and a tourist voucher.)
- Oman
- Palau
- Serbia
- Seychelles
- Thailand

14 days

- Brunei^{1}
- Hong Kong
- Nauru

Temporary regime:

30 days

- China (until 31 December 2027)
- Vietnam (until 15 October 2027)

_{ID – May enter with a national ID card in lieu of a passport.}
_{ID^{KZ} – May enter with a national ID card in lieu of a passport if arriving directly from Kazakhstan.}
_{IP – May enter with an internal passport in lieu of a passport.}
_{1 – 90 days within any 180-day period.}
_{2 – 90 days within any 365-day period.}
_{3 - 90 days within a year.}
_{4 – 60 days within any 180-day period.}
_{5 – 30 days within any 60-day period.}
_{6 - 30 days within any 180-day period for tourist purposes, 90 days within any 180-day period for business purposes.}

=== Future changes ===
The Russian government has signed visa exemption agreements with the following countries, but they have not yet entered into force:

Country	Passports	Days
San Marino	All	90 days within any 180-day period
Micronesia (Note: Currently, the entry into force of the agreement is uncertain because Micronesia is classified as a non-friendly country.)	All	30 days

The Russian government is currently in discussions to conclude visa exemption agreements with the following countries:

- Bahamas
- Bahrain
- Barbados
- Eswatini
- Haiti
- Hong Kong^{A}
- Indonesia
- Kuwait
- Malaysia
- Mexico
- Mozambique
- Saint Lucia
- Trinidad and Tobago
- Vietnam
- Zambia
- Zimbabwe

_{A – 30 days for ordinary passports.}

=== Historical changes in visa requirements ===
Date of visa changes

Citizens of Armenia, Azerbaijan, Belarus, Kazakhstan, Kyrgyzstan, Moldova, Tajikistan, Ukraine and Uzbekistan have never required a visa to enter the Russian Federation.

- 29 July 1994: Cuba (Note: Previous visa-free agreements under different terms were applied in period 1981-1985 and 1985-1994. 30 days from 29 Jul 1994 to 21 December 2018; 90 days within 180 days period from 21 December 2018.)
- 24 March 2007: Thailand
- 17 June 2008: Estonia and Latvia (holders of an alien passport and a non-citizen passport) (resumed)
- 20 September 2008: Israel
- 31 October 2008: North Macedonia (Note: Previous visa-free agreement was applied in period 1990-2008 (was signed between USSR and Yugoslavia).)
- 21 November 2008: Montenegro (Note: Previous visa-free agreement under different terms was applied in period 1990-2008 (was signed between USSR and Yugoslavia).)
- 6 March 2009: Venezuela
- 10 June 2009: Serbia (Note: Previous visa-free agreement under different terms were applied in period 1965 (on duty)/1967 (for tourism)-1990 and 1990-2009 (were signed between USSR and Yugoslavia).)
- 29 June 2009: Argentina
- 1 July 2009: Hong Kong
- 7 June 2010: Brazil
- 3 July 2010: Nicaragua
- 18 January 2011: Chile
- 13 March 2011: Colombia
- 25 April 2011: South Ossetia
- 26 April 2011: Abkhazia
- 21 June 2011: Peru
- 27 December 2011: Uruguay
- 29 February 2012: Guatemala
- 30 September 2012: Macao
- 24 November 2012: Ecuador
- 1 May 2013: Bosnia and Herzegovina (Note: Previous visa-free agreements under different terms were applied in period 1990-2008 (was signed between USSR and Yugoslavia) and 2008-2013.)
- 29 July 2013: Fiji
- 1 January 2014: South Korea
- 20 October 2014: Paraguay
- 14 November 2014: Mongolia (resumed under different terms)
- 8 February 2015: Panama
- 14 May 2015: Nauru
- 11 July 2015: Honduras
- 27 November 2015: Guyana
- 14 December 2015: Seychelles
- 10 April 2016: Mauritius
- 27 August 2016: El Salvador
- 3 October 2016: Bolivia
- 21 October 2016: Vanuatu
- 30 March 2017: South Africa
- 9 July 2017: Samoa
- 21 November 2017: Saint Kitts and Nevis
- 2 December 2017: Laos
- 24 December 2017: Grenada
- 8 January 2018: Brunei
- 27 November 2018: Jamaica
- 27 December 2018: Palau
- 7 January 2019: Saint Vincent and the Grenadines
- 14 January 2019: Dominica
- 17 February 2019: United Arab Emirates
- 13 May 2019: Suriname
- 25 May 2019: Costa Rica
- 25 July 2019: Maldives
- 8 October 2019: Botswana
- 22 October 2019: Antigua and Barbuda
- 23 February 2020: Qatar
- 4 July 2020: Cape Verde
- 25 November 2020: Andorra
- 15 December 2020: Dominican Republic
- 2 August 2021: Namibia
- 12 January 2022: Belize
- 10 May 2023: Georgia (resumed)
- 10 October 2024: Georgia (unlimited for the duration of study or work)
- 18 July 2025: Oman
- 1 December 2025: China
- 13 December 2025: Jordan
- 27 January 2026: Myanmar
- 11 May 2026: Saudi Arabia
- 15 October 2026: Vietnam (resumed under different terms)

Cancelled: As the Soviet Union:

- East Germany: 1990 (Note: Visa-free agreements were applied in period 1970-1979, 1979-1990.)

Cancelled: As the Russian Federation:

- Estonia and Latvia: 12 May 1993 (Note: Except «citizens of the former USSR permanently residing in the territory of the Republic of Latvia and the Republic of Estonia who have not received citizenship of these States».)
- Vietnam: 20 February 1994 (Note: Was applied from 14 August 1982.) (resumed under different terms in 2026)
- Lithuania: 19 April 1994
- Mongolia: 5 May 1995 (Note: Was applied from 23 May 1971.) (resumed under different terms in 2014)
- North Korea: 22 May 1997 (Note: Was applied from 22 January 1986.)
- Turkmenistan: 17 July 1999
- Slovenia: 1 December 1999 (Note: Was applied as Yugoslavia from 26 April 1990.)
- Czech Republic: 29 May 2000 (Note: Visa-free agreements under different terms were applied in period 1962-1965, 1965-1969, 1969-1982, 1982-1995 as Czechoslovakia and 1995-2000.)
- Georgia: 3 December 2000 (was resumed in 2023)
- Estonia and Latvia (holders of an alien passport and a non-citizen passport): 1 January 2001 (was resumed in 2008)
- Slovakia: 1 January 2001 (Note: Visa-free agreements under different terms were applied in period 1962-1965, 1965-1969, 1969-1982, 1982-1994 as Czechoslovakia and 1994-1995, 1995-2001.)
- Hungary: 14 June 2001
- Bulgaria: 7 May 2002
- Poland: 1 October 2003
- Cyprus: 1 January 2004 (Note: Was applied from 15 June 1995.)
- Romania: 1 March 2004
- Croatia: 31 March 2013
- Turkey: 1 January 2016 (Note: Was applied from 16 April 2011.)
- Montenegro: 30 December 2026

=== APEC Business Travel Card ===
Holders of APEC Business Travel Cards as well as passports issued by full members of APEC (listed below) may enter Russia without a visa for business trips for up to 90 days within any 180-day period.

ABTCs are issued to citizens of:

- Australia
- Brunei
- Chile
- China
- Hong Kong
- Indonesia
- Japan
- South Korea
- Malaysia
- Mexico
- New Zealand
- Papua New Guinea
- Peru
- Philippines
- Singapore
- Taiwan
- Thailand
- Vietnam

=== Other visa exemptions ===
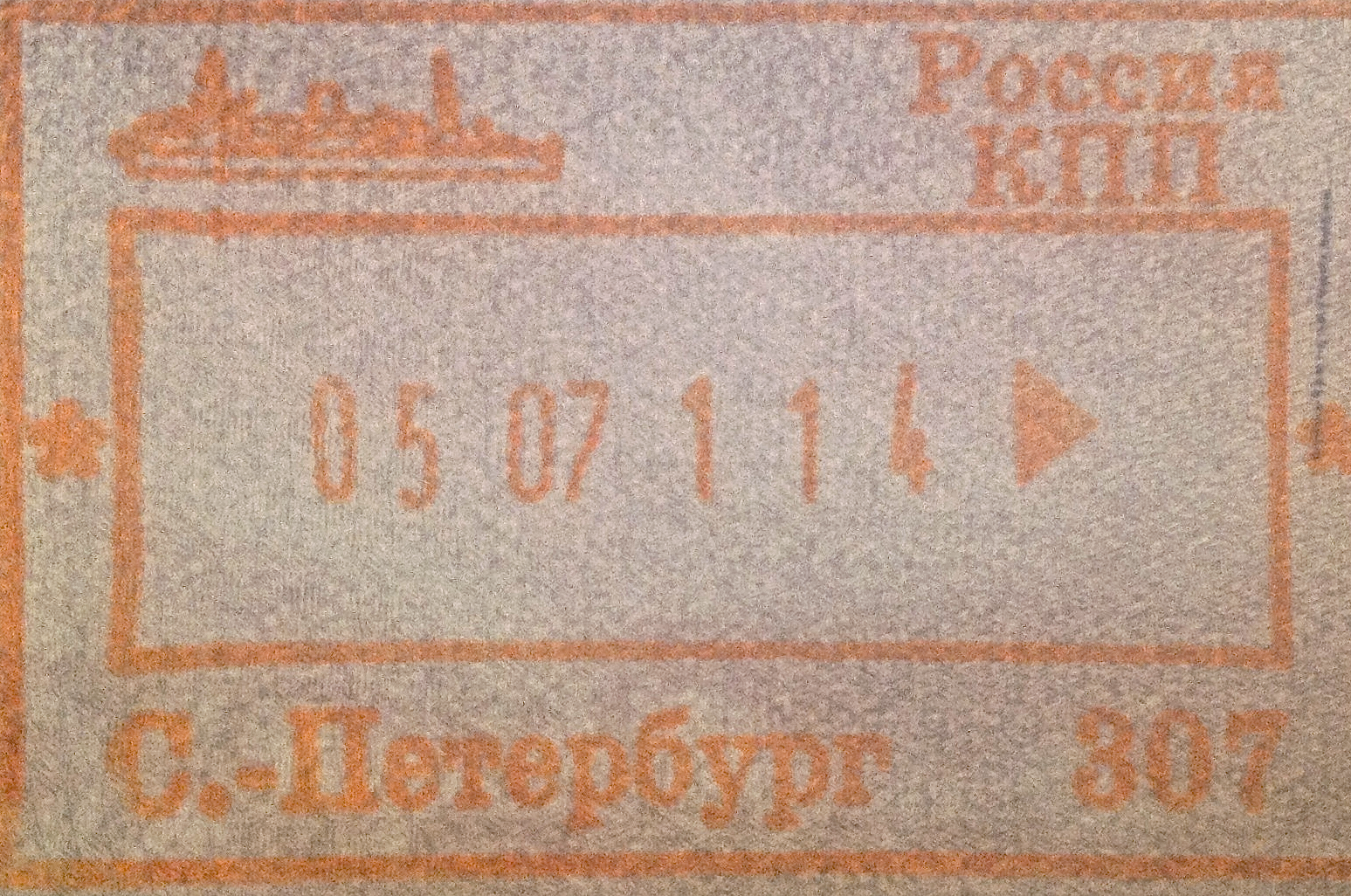
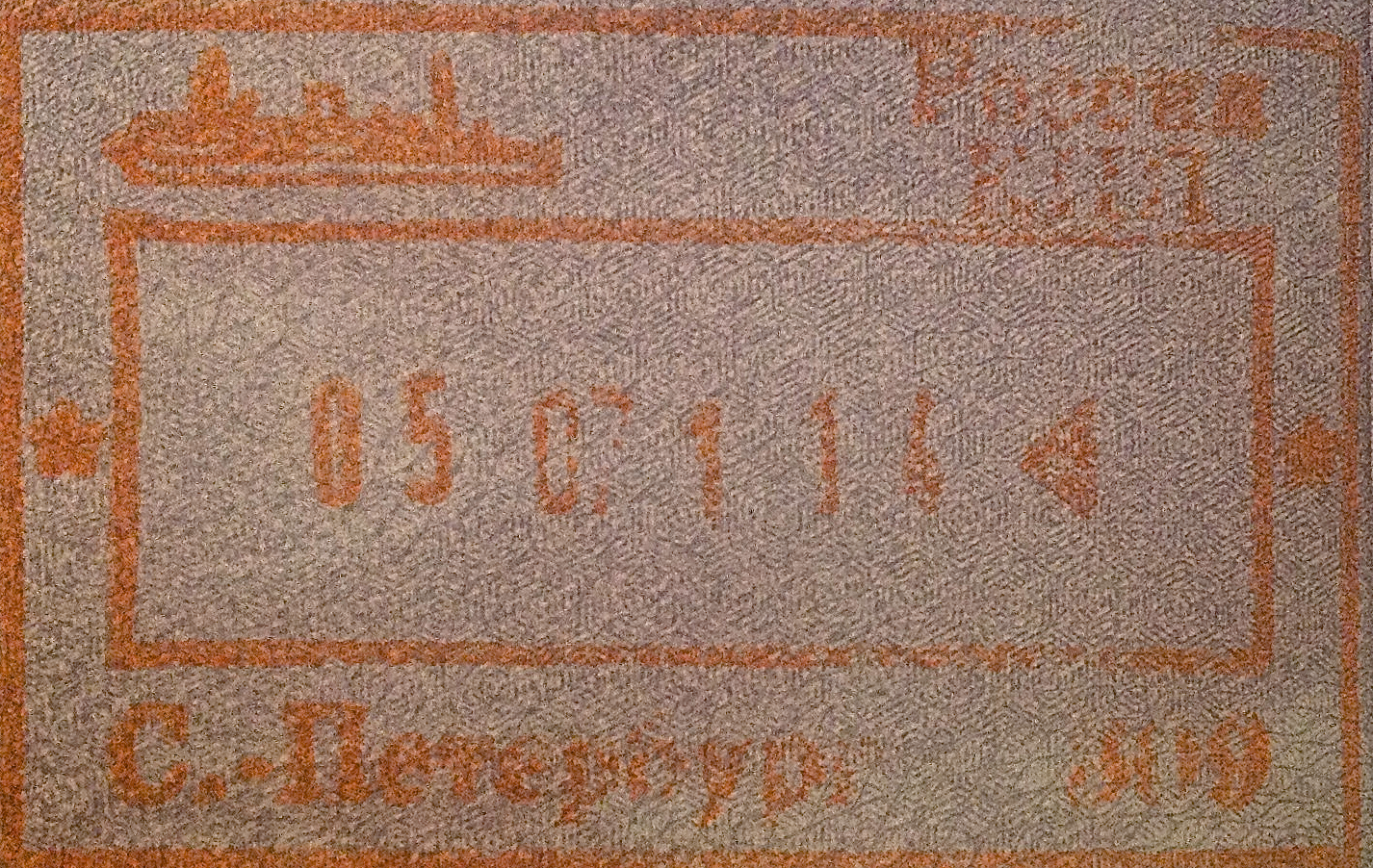
Entry and exit passport stamps issued at the Great Port of Saint Petersburg

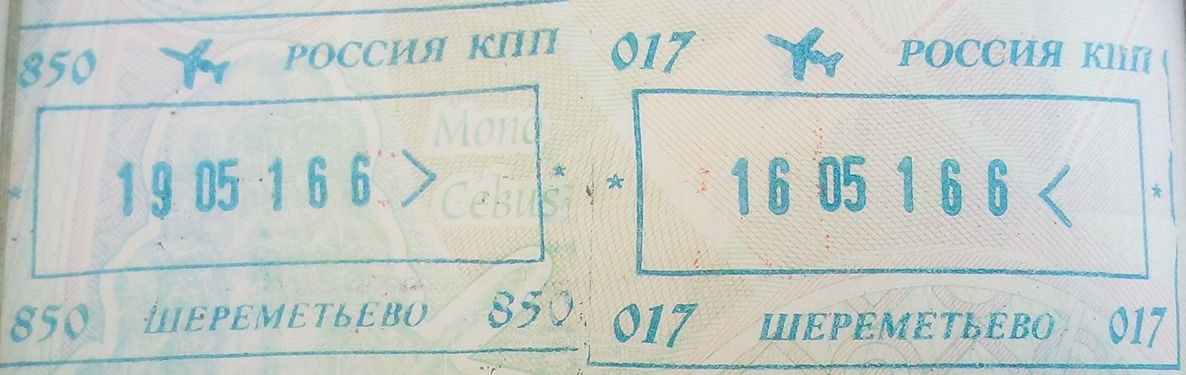
Entry stamp in the Russian federation issued at Sheremetyevo Airport

==== Economic integration and international treaties ====
The following partnerships provide for special entry rules to citizens of certain countries:

- Union State of Russia and Belarus (citizens of Belarus)
- Single Economic Space of the Eurasian Economic Union (citizens of Armenia, Belarus, Kazakhstan, Kyrgyzstan)
- Mobility rights arrangements of the Commonwealth of Independent States (citizens of present and former countries of the Commonwealth of Independent States, including Ukraine and Georgia, but not Turkmenistan)
- Members of the Commonwealth of Independent States (Armenia, Belarus, Kazakhstan, Kyrgyzstan, Russia, Tajikistan, Uzbekistan) are working on the formation of the Common labor market of the Commonwealth of Independent States.

==== Tour groups from Iran ====
- Iran
Citizens of Iran may visit Russia without a visa for up to 15 days during one trip, but no more than 90 days within any 180-day period if traveling as part of a tour group from 5 to 50 persons that is accompanied by a representative of a tour operator registered in both countries (Russia-Iran).

==== Mutual recognition of visas between Russia and Belarus ====
Holders of a valid visa or residence permit of either Belarus or Russia and a mutually recognized identity document may enter both countries, within the validity of the visa; however, this policy does not apply to e-visas. In cases where one country has a visa-free regime and the other requires a visa, the person must hold both the ID document and a visa for the latter.

Foreign nationals with temporary permanent residency or a document for attending an international event have the right to enter, exit, stay, and transit without a visa within the validity of their documents.

Stay duration is calculated from entry into one country from a third state.

The common visa does not apply to individuals restricted from entering either country. Officials retain the right to deny entry or reduce the duration of stay for any foreign national or stateless person, as well as to check compliance with entry, exit, transit, or stay regulations.

Crossing between Belarus and Russia via land is allowed only at the following 6 international border crossing points:

- Yukhovichi – Dolossy (Opochka – Novopolotsk)
- Yezeryshche – Nevel (Kyiv – St. Petersburg)
- Lyozno – Kruglovka (Vitebsk – Smolensk)
- Redki – Krasnaya Gorka (Minsk – Moscow)
- Zvenchatka – Dubovichka (Bobruisk – Moscow)
- Selishche – Novozybkov (Gomel – Bryansk)

==== Visa-free visits for up to 72 hours for cruise ship and ferry passengers ====
International tourists entering by regular ferry via several ports are able to stay in Russia visa-free for up to 72 hours, provided that they spend the night on-board or in accommodation specifically approved by the travel agency.

In addition, tourists entering by tourist cruise ships can leave the ship visa-free on tours organized by any authorized local tour company, when entering Russia through the ports of Anadyr, Kaliningrad, Korsakov, Novorossiysk, Murmansk, Sevastopol, Sochi, Saint Petersburg (Great Port of Saint Petersburg and Passenger Port of St. Petersburg), Vladivostok, Vyborg, Zarubino.

==== Visa-free visits to Chukotka Autonomous Okrug by indigenous Alaskans ====
- United States – Residents of Alaska who are members of the indigenous population do not require a visa to visit Chukotka Autonomous Okrug if they have relatives (blood relatives, members of the same tribe, native people who have similar language and cultural heritage) in Chukotka. Individuals must be invited by a relative in Chukotka and must leave Chukotka within 90 days. Entry points are in Anadyr, Provideniya, Lavrentiya and Uelen. The agreement was signed between USSR and United States on 23 September 1989 but came into force on 17 July 2015 after ratification by the United States.

==== Visa-free visits to border areas by residents of Latvia ====
- Latvia – Residents of the border areas of Latvia who have a permit for local border traffic can visit the border areas of Russia without a visa.

The territory covered by the agreement with Latvia
Latvia	Alūksne Municipality	Alsviķi parish, Alūksne town, Anna parish, Jaunalūksne parish, Jaunanna parish, Jaunlaicene parish, Liepna parish, Maliena parish, Mālupe parish, Mārkalne parish, Pededze parish, Veclaicene parish, Ziemeri parish
Latvia	Baltinava Municipality	
Latvia	Balvi Municipality	Balvi parish, Balvi town, Bērzkalne parish, Bērzpils parish, Briežuciems parish, Krišjāņi parish, Kubuli parish, Lazduleja parish, Tilža parish, Vectilža parish, Vīksna parish.
Latvia	Cibla Municipality	Blonti parish, Cibla parish, Līdumnieki parish, Pušmucova parish, Zvirgzdene parish.
Latvia	Dagda Municipality	Bērziņi parish, Ezernieki parish, Ķepova parish, Svariņi parish, Šķaune parish
Latvia	Kārsava Municipality	Goliševa parish, Kārsava town, Malnava parish, Mērdzene parish, Mežvidi parish, Salnava parish.
Latvia	Ludza Municipality	Briģi parish, Cirma parish, Isnauda parish, Istra parish, Ludza town, Nirza parish, Ņukši parish, Pilda parish, Pureņi parish, Rundēni parish.
Latvia	Rēzekne Municipality	Bērzgale parish, Dricāni parish, Gaigalava parish, Ilzeskalns parish, Lendži parish, Nautrēni parish, Strūžāni parish.
Latvia	Rugāji Municipality	Lazdukalns parish, Rugāji parish.
Latvia	Viļaka Municipality	Kuprava parish, Medņeva parish, Susāji parish, Šķilbēni parish, Vecumi parish, Viļaka town, Žīguri parish.
Latvia	Zilupe Municipality	Lauderi parish, Pasiene parish, Zaļesje Parish, Zilupe town.
Russia	Pskov Oblast	Krasnogorodsky District: Krasnogorodsk, Pogranichnaya Volost, Krasnogorodskaya Volost, Partizanskaya Volost.; Opochetsky District: Varyginskaya Volost, Makushinskaya Volost, Prigorodnaya Volost.; Ostrovsky District: Ostrov, Berezhanskaya Volost, Gorayskaya Volost.; Palkinsky District: Palkino, Kachanovskaya Volost, Rodonskaya Volost, Palkinskaya Volost, Novousitovskaya Volost, Vasilyevskaya Volost, Cherskaya Volost.; Pechorsky District: Pechory, Lavrovskaya Volost, Kruppskaya Volost, Novoizborskaya Volost, Izborskaya Volost, Panikovskaya Volost.; Pytalovsky District: Pytalovo, Gavrovskaya Volost, Linovskaya Volost, Nosovskaya Volost, Skalinskaya Volost, Vyshgorodskaya Volost, Tulinskaya Volost, Utroinskaya Volost.; Sebezhsky District: Sebezh, Sosnovy Bor, Sebezhskaya Volost, Mostischenskaya Volost.

==== Visa-free visits to border areas by residents of Kazakhstan ====
Residents of the border areas of Kazakhstan who visit the territory of the border areas of Russia up to three days can enter Russia through checkpoints, which are specially installed for residents of border areas.

==== Visa-free visits to border areas by residents of Norway ====
- Norway – 15 days for holders of border traffic permit

Residents of the border areas of Norway who have a permit for local border traffic can visit the border areas of Russia without a visa. From 4 March 2017, the Protocol on amendments to the current agreement entered into force – residents of Neiden, Norway and nearby received the right to receive a permit for local border traffic.

The territory covered by the agreement with Norway
Norway	Finnmark county: Sør-Varanger Municipality, within a zone of 30 kilometres (19 mi) from the border + the Neiden village area.
Russia	Pechengsky District: Korzunovo municipality, Zapolyarny municipality and the territory of Pechenga municipality and Nickel municipality within a zone of 30 kilometres (19 mi) from the border.

==== Visa-free visits to border areas by residents of Poland ====
- Poland – 30 days, for a maximum total stay of 90 days within a 180-day period for holders of border traffic permit

From 27 July 2012, residents of the border areas of Poland who have a permit for local border traffic can visit Kaliningrad Oblast without a visa. The agreement has been suspended for an indefinite period by Poland from 4 July 2016.

The territory covered by the agreement with Poland
Poland	Pomeranian Voivodeship	Towns: Gdańsk, Gdynia, Sopot. Gdańsk County, Malbork County, Nowy Dwór County, Puck County.
Poland	Warmian-Masurian Voivodeship	Towns: Elbląg, Olsztyn. Bartoszyce County, Braniewo County, Elbląg County, Giżycko County, Gołdap County, Kętrzyn County, Lidzbark County, Mrągowo County, Olecko County, Olsztyn County, Węgorzewo County.
Russia	Kaliningrad Oblast	

==== Crew members ====
Citizens of following countries may visit Russia without a visa if they are travelling as part of the airline crew: Afghanistan, Algeria, Austria, Belgium, Bulgaria, Canada, China, Croatia, Cyprus, Czech Republic, Denmark, Egypt, Ethiopia, Finland, France, Germany, Greece, Iceland, India, Iraq, Italy, Japan, Jordan, Latvia, Lebanon, Libya, Lithuania, Luxembourg, Malta, Netherlands, North Korea, North Macedonia, Norway, Oman, Poland, Portugal, Qatar, Romania, Singapore, Spain, Sri Lanka, Sweden, Switzerland, Turkmenistan, United Arab Emirates, United Kingdom, and Vietnam.

Agreements are pending for Georgia and Tunisia.

Citizens of following countries may visit Russia without a visa if they are travelling as part of the sea crew: Bulgaria, China,^{1} Croatia, Cyprus, DR Congo, Egypt, France, Iran, Iraq, Lithuania, North Korea, Poland, Tunisia, Turkey, Turkmenistan, Vietnam.

Citizens of following countries may visit Russia without a visa if they are travelling as part of the railway crew: China, North Korea, Turkmenistan.

=== In-airport transfers ===
Passengers travelling through international airports do not need a visa for a transit of less than 24 hours in most circumstances, provided a confirmed onward ticket is held and the traveller remains in the international transit area, without clearing regular passport control.

The following international Russian airports do not have international transit areas, meaning a transit visa is required to transfer planes:

- Irkutsk Airport (IKT)
- Khabarovsk Airport (KHV)
- Krasnodar Airport (KRR)
- Mineralnye Vody Airport (MRV)
- Rostov Airport (ROV)
- Sochi Airport (AER)
- Yuzhno-Sakhalinsk Airport (UUS)
- Zhukovsky Airport (ZIA)

==== Saimaa canal ====
In accordance with a treaty between Russia and Finland, though there are passport controls at borders, a visa is not required for just passing through the Russian part of the Saimaa canal without leaving the vessel.

==== Värska–Ulitina road ====
The road from Värska to Ulitina in Estonia, traditionally the only road to the Ulitina area, goes through Russian territory for one kilometre (0.6 mi) of its length, an area called Saatse Boot. This road has no border control, but there is no connection to any other road in Russia. It is not permitted to stop or walk along the road. This area is a part of Russia but is also a de facto part of the Schengen area.

=== Electronic visa (e-Visa) ===
Russian E-visa

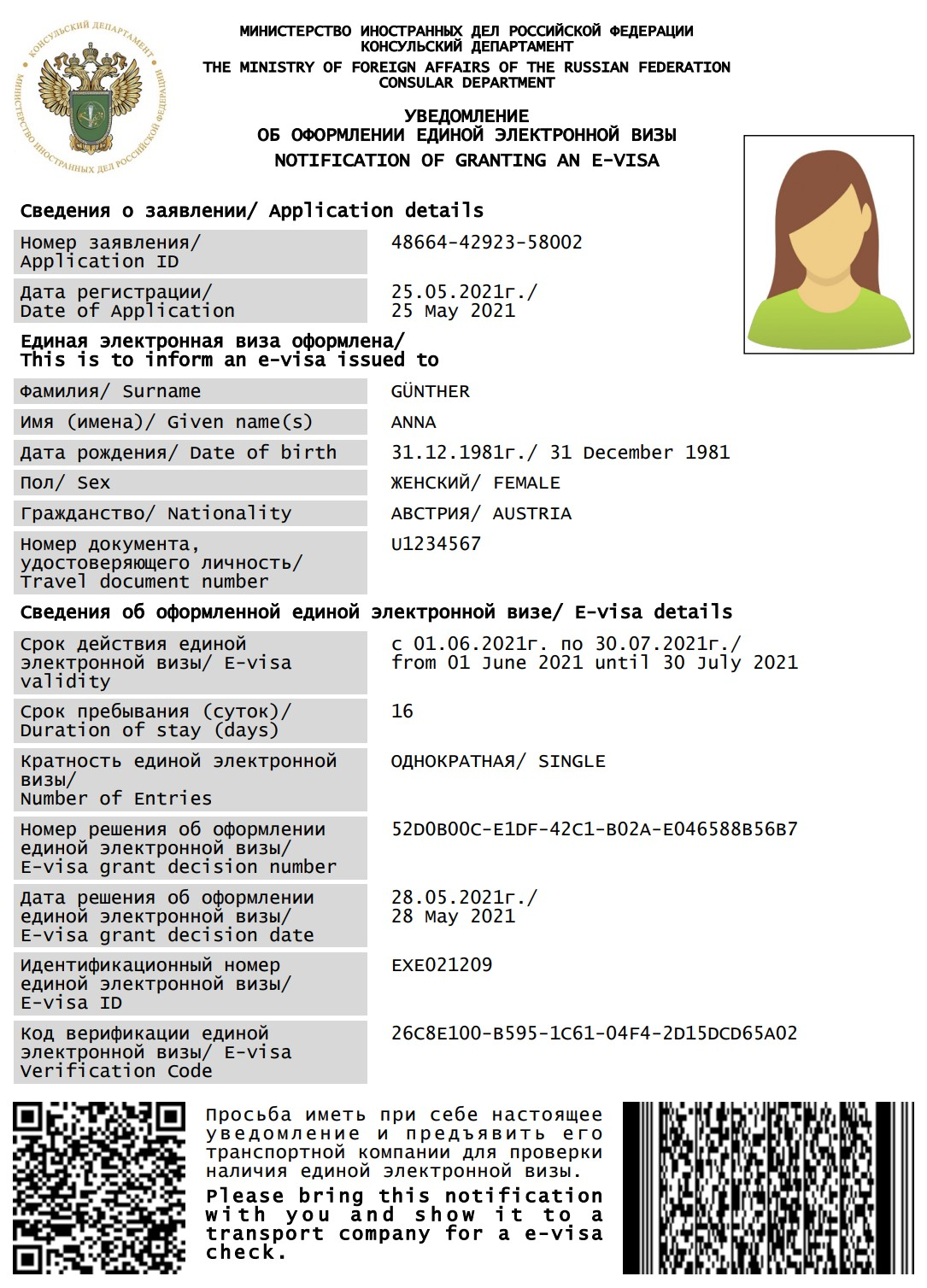
- Sample of Russian notification of granting an eVisa
- Owners: Consular Department, Ministry of Foreign Affairs
- Website: evisa.kdmid.ru

Citizens of the following 64 countries and territories may obtain an electronic visa (e-Visa), which allows entry for up to 30 days until 120 days after issuance.

- All European Union member states
- Bahrain
- Barbados
- Bhutan
- Cambodia
- China^{*}
- Eswatini
- Iceland
- India
- Indonesia
- Iran
- Japan
- Jordan^{*}
- Kenya
- Kuwait
- Liechtenstein
- Malaysia
- Mexico
- Monaco
- Myanmar
- North Korea
- North Macedonia
- Norway
- Oman
- Papua New Guinea
- Philippines
- Saint Lucia
- San Marino
- Saudi Arabia
- Singapore
- Switzerland
- Taiwan
- Tonga
- Trinidad and Tobago
- Turkey
- Turkmenistan
- Vatican City
- Vietnam
- Zimbabwe

_{* – Visa-exempt in general.}

Border crossing points for eVisa holders

Airports (51)

- Abakan
- Anadyr
- Arkhangelsk
- Astrakhan
- Barnaul
- Belgorod
- Bryansk
- Vladivostok
- Vladikavkaz (Beslan)
- Volgograd
- Grozny
- Yekaterinburg
- Irkutsk
- Kazan
- Kaliningrad
- Kaluga
- Kemerovo
- Krasnodar
- Krasnoyarsk
- Lipetsk
- Makhachkala
- Mineralnye Vody
- Moscow – Domodedovo
- Moscow – Sheremetyevo
- Moscow – Vnukovo
- Moscow – Zhukovsky
- Murmansk
- Nalchik
- Nizhny Novgorod
- Novosibirsk
- Omsk
- Orenburg
- Perm
- Petropavlovsk-Kamchatsky
- Rostov-on-Don
- Samara
- Saint Petersburg
- Saratov
- Sochi (Adler)
- Syktyvkar
- Tomsk
- Tyumen
- Ulan-Ude
- Ulyanovsk
- Ufa
- Khabarovsk
- Cheboksary
- Chelyabinsk
- Chita
- Yuzhno-Sakhalinsk
- Yaroslavl

Seaports (14)

- Kaliningrad
- Kandalaksha
- Korsakov
- Magadan
- Murmansk
- Nikolayevsk-on-Amur
- Petropavlovsk-Kamchatsky
- Posyet
- Great Port of Saint Petersburg
- Saint Petersburg – Passenger Port
- Sochi
- Vladivostok – Sea passenger terminal
- Vladivostok – Zarubino
- Vysotsk

Railways (8)

- Zabaykalsk Station – China side: Manzhouli Station (multilateral)
- Mamonovo Station – Poland side: Braniewo Station
- Makhalino Station (Kraskino) – China side: Hunchun Station (not in operation)
- Naushki Station – Mongolia side: Sükhbaatar Station
- Grodekovo Station (Pogranichny) – China side: Suifenhe Station (multilateral)
- Saint-Petersburg (Finland Station)
- Sovetsk Station – Lithuania side: Pagėgiai Station
- Khasan Station – North Korea side: Tumangang Station

Roads (26)

- Russia – China border (3)
  - Poltavka – China side: Dongning (unilateral)
  - Starotsurukhaytuy – China side: Heishantou (unilateral)
  - Turiy Rog – China side: Mishan (unilateral)
- Russia – Estonia border (3)
  - Ivangorod – Estonia side: Narva
  - Kunichina Gora – Estonia side: Koidula
  - Shumilkino – Estonia side: Luhamaa
- Russia – Finland border (7)
  - Brusnichnoye – Finland side: Nuijamaa
  - Lyuttya – Finland side: Vartius
  - Salla – Finland side: Salla
  - Svetogorsk – Finland side: Imatra
  - Suoperya – Finland side: Kuusamo
  - Torfyanovka – Finland side: Vaalimaa
  - Vyartsilya – Finland side: Niirala
- Russia – Georgia border (1)
  - Verkhniy Lars – Georgia side: Dariali
- Russia – Latvia border (2)
  - Burachki – Latvia side: Terehova
  - Ubylinka – Latvia side: Grebnova
- Russia – Lithuania border (4)
  - Chernyshevskoye – Lithuania side: Kybartai
  - Morskoye – Lithuania side: Nida
  - Pogranichny – Lithuania side: Ramoniškių
  - Sovetsk – Lithuania side: Panemunė
- Russia – Mongolia border (3)
  - Kyakhta – Mongolia side: Altanbulag
  - Solovyevsk – Mongolia side: Chuluunkhoroot
  - Tashanta – Mongolia side: Tsagaannuur
- Russia – Poland border (4)
  - Bagrationovsk – Poland side: Bezledy
  - Gusev – Poland side: Gołdap
  - Mamonovo I – Poland side: Gronowo
  - Mamonovo II – Poland side: Grzechotki

Mixed (3)

- Amurzet – China side: Luobei (multilateral)
- Blagoveshchensk – China side: Heihe (multilateral)
- Pokrovka, Khabarovsk Krai – China side: Raohe (unilateral)

River (1)

- Khabarovsk – China side: Fuyuan (multilateral, open from May to October)

Pedestrians (1)

- Ivangorod – Estonia side: Narva

== Holders of non-ordinary passports ==
Holders of diplomatic or various categories of service passports (consular, official, service, special) of the following countries and territories may enter and remain in Russia without a visa for the following period:

Visa policy of Russia for holders of non-ordinary passports The Russian Federation Visa not required for holders of diplomatic, official or service passports Visa not required for holders of official passports Visa not required for holders of diplomatic passports Visa required

Freedom of movement

- Belarus^{D S}
- South Ossetia^{D S}

90 days

- Abkhazia^{D S}
- Albania^{D S}
- Algeria^{1 D S}
- Andorra^{2 D}
- Angola^{D S}
- Antigua and Barbuda^{1 D O}
- Armenia^{3 D}
- Azerbaijan^{3 D S}
- Bahrain^{1 D O Sp}
- Belize^{1 D O}
- Benin^{D S}
- Bosnia and Herzegovina^{D S}
- Botswana^{D S}
- Brazil^{D S}
- Bulgaria^{1 O}
- Burkina Faso^{D S}
- Burundi^{1 D S}
- Cape Verde^{D S}
- Cambodia^{1 D S}
- Cameroon^{1 D S}
- Central African Republic^{1 D S}
- Chad^{D S} (from 30 November 2026)
- Chile^{D O}
- Colombia^{D O S}
- DR Congo^{1 D S}
- Congo^{D S}
- Croatia^{1 O}
- Cuba^{1 D O S}
- Djibouti^{1 D S}
- Dominica^{1 D S}
- Dominican Republic^{D S}
- Ecuador^{D O Sp}
- Egypt^{D S Sp}
- El Salvador^{D O}
- Equatorial Guinea^{1 D O S}
- Eswatini^{1 D S}
- Ethiopia^{D S}
- Fiji^{D}
- Gabon^{D S}
- Gambia^{D S}
- Georgia^{3 D S}
- Grenada^{1 D S}
- Guatemala^{C D O}
- Guinea^{D S}
- Guinea-Bissau^{D S}
- Guyana^{D S}
- Honduras^{D O}
- Hungary^{1 O}
- India^{D O S}
- Iraq^{1 D S Sp}
- Jamaica^{D S}
- Jordan^{1 D S Sp}
- Kazakhstan^{3 D S}
- Kuwait^{1 D S Sp}
- Kyrgyzstan^{3 D S}
- Lebanon^{1 D S}
- Maldives^{D S}
- Mali^{D S}
- Mauritania^{1 D S}
- Mexico^{D O S}
- Moldova^{3 D S}
- Montenegro^{D S} (until 30 December 2026)
- Morocco^{D S}
- Myanmar^{4 D O S}
- Namibia^{1 D O}
- Nepal^{4 D S O}
- Nicaragua^{D O S}
- Niger^{1 D S}
- North Korea^{D S}
- North Macedonia^{D S}
- Oman^{D S Sp}
- Pakistan^{D S}
- Palau^{D S}
- Palestine^{1 D}
- Panama^{C D O S Sp}
- Paraguay^{D S}
- Peru^{D S Sp}
- Philippines^{D O S}
- Qatar^{1 D Sp}
- Rwanda^{1 D S}
- Saint Kitts and Nevis^{1 D O}
- Saint Vincent and the Grenadines^{1 D O}
- Saudi Arabia^{D Sp}
- Senegal^{D S}
- Serbia^{D S}
- Sierra Leone^{1 D S}
- Singapore^{D O S}
- South Africa^{D O S}
- South Korea^{D O S}
- Sudan^{1 D}
- Suriname^{1 D S}
- Syria^{D S Sp}
- Tajikistan^{3 D S}
- Thailand^{D S}
- Togo^{1 D S}
- Tunisia^{1 D S Sp}
- Turkey^{D}
- Ukraine^{3 D S}
- United Arab Emirates^{1 D Sp}
- Uruguay^{D O S}
- Uzbekistan^{3 D S}
- Vanuatu^{D S}
- Venezuela^{D S}
- Vietnam^{D S}
- Zambia^{1 D}
- Zimbabwe^{5 D S}

3 months^{3}

- Argentina^{D O S}
- Bolivia^{D O S}
- Costa Rica^{D S}

60 days

- Mauritius^{1 D S}
- Samoa^{D O}

30 days

- Bangladesh^{D O S}
- China^{D S}
- Iran^{D S}
- Laos^{D S}
- Mongolia^{1 D S}
- Mozambique^{D S}
- Seychelles^{D O}
- Sri Lanka^{D O S}
- Turkey^{1 S Sp}
- Turkmenistan^{D S}

14 days

- Brunei^{D O S}
- Indonesia^{D S}
- Nauru^{D O}

_{C – Consular passports}
_{D – Diplomatic passports}
_{O – Official passports}
_{S – Service passports}
_{Sp – Special passports}

_{1 – 90 days within any 180-day period.}
_{2 – 90 days within any 365-day period.}
_{3 – 90 days within a calendar year.}
_{4 – With the right of multiple entry and exit.}
_{5 – Applies only to employees of official institutions operating in the territory of a contracting parties and their families.}

The visa exemption for holders of diplomatic passports of European Union member states, Iceland, Liechtenstein, Norway and Switzerland has been suspended.

Holders of diplomatic or service passports of Israel require a visa.

=== Possible future additions ===
The Russian government is considering visa exemption provisions for non-ordinary passport holders of the following countries:

Country	Passports	Days
Chad	Diplomatic and service	90 days within any 180-day period
Côte d'Ivoire	Diplomatic and service	90 days within any 180-day period
Eritrea	Diplomatic and service	90 days within any 180-day period
Ghana	Diplomatic and service	90 days within any 180-day period
Uganda	Diplomatic and service	90 days within any 180 day-period

== Closed cities ==
In accordance with the Government Decree of 1992, special authorization is required to enter 19 closed cities in Russia. This restriction does not apply to Russian citizens.

A full list of such areas:

1. Part of Kamchatka Krai.
2. abolished
3. Part of Primorsky Krai.
4. Part of Krasnoyarsk Krai.
5. Part of Orenburg Oblast.
6. Part of Nizhny Novgorod Oblast.
7. Part of The Republic of Mordovia.
8. Parts of Murmansk Oblast and the Republic of Karelia. Transit to/from Norway is possible by main road.
9. Parts of Arkhangelsk Oblast (include South part of Novaya Zemlya island) and the Komi Republic.
10. Parts of Sverdlovsk Oblast.
11. Parts of Chelyabinsk Oblast.
12. In Leningrad Oblast – all Russian islands of Gulf of Finland, except Gogland, and 20 kilometres (12 mi) strip along south coast of the Gulf of Finland.
13. Parts of Moscow Oblast.
14. Part of Kaliningrad Oblast, approx. 15%.
15. Part of Volgograd Oblast.
16. Part of Astrakhan Oblast.
17. Chukotka Autonomous Okrug, all except Bilibino region.
18. Part of Yamalo-Nenets Autonomous Okrug.
19. The Republic of North Ossetia-Alania, 45% of territory. Transit to border with Georgia and to border with South Ossetia are possible along the main roads. Tsey Gorge was opened for foreigners from 2012.

== Simplified Ordinary Tourist Visa ==
The Russian government issues general tourist visas for up to 6 months to citizens from 19 countries with only a hotel reservation or other confirmation of accommodation reservation.

- Bahrain
- Brunei
- Cambodia
- China
- Philippines
- India
- Indonesia
- Iran
- Kuwait
- Laos
- Malaysia
- Mexico
- Myanmar
- North Korea
- Oman
- Saudi Arabia
- Serbia
- Thailand
- Turkey

== Historical visitor statistics ==
Total visitors for all purposes by year
2019	▲32,866,265
2018	▲32,550,677
2017	▲32,035,443
2016	▼31,466,538
2015	▲33,729,187
2014	▲32,421,490
2013	▲30,792,091
2012	▲28,176,502
2011	▲24,932,061
2010	▲22,281,217
2009	▼21,338,650
2008	▲23,676,140
2007	22,908,625

Number of visitors for all purposes by nationality by year (2024–2021)
Nationality	Total			
Nationality	2024	2023	2022	2021
Kazakhstan	3,407,706	3,163,214		
Uzbekistan	3,360,423	3,109,445		
Tajikistan	1,701,543	2,153,956		
China	1,695,873	794,387		
Kyrgyzstan	1,195,392	1,140,239		
Abkhazia	718,101	764,766		
Armenia	621,015	616,659		
Azerbaijan	533,020	476,743		
Belarus	519,591	414,677		
Mongolia	367,451	311,479		

Number of visitors for all purposes by nationality by year (2020–2016)
Nationality	Total				
Nationality	2020	2019	2018	2017	2016
Ukraine	▼3,648,972	▼8,646,295	▼9,177,272	▲9,817,008	▼9,737,405
Kazakhstan	▼1,426,727	▲4,324,856	▲4,241,244	▼4,137,613	▼4,686,059
Uzbekistan	▼720,041	▲2,588,922	▲2,354,642	▲2,350,007	▼2,116,480
Abkhazia	▼414,927	▲600,399	▲492,310	▲436,368	▼415,606
Tajikistan	▼401,888	▲1,557,148	▼1,340,975	▲1,350,356	▲1,293,270
Kyrgyzstan	▼299,611	▲959,130	▲859,735	▲836,946	▼792,042
Azerbaijan	▼269,807	▲1,175,045	▲1,145,327	▼1,143,243	▲1,156,703
Armenia	▼209,812	▼816,454	▼825,200	▲857,212	▼833,577
Finland	▼180,110	▼938,693	▼994,098	▼1,063,348	▼1,376,646
Belarus	▼176,601	▲440,438	▲403,597	▲382,022	▼320,372
China	▼155,594	▲2,257,039	▲2,030,319	▲1,780,200	▲1,565,524
Moldova	▼154,766	▼614,043	▼698,027	▲803,916	▼699,112
Philippines	▼133,414	▲193,031	▲179,672	▲172,278	▼160,734
Poland	▼133,014	▼680,382	▼728,546	▼765,544	▼1,056,013
Turkey	▼132,372	▼187,612	▲196,061	▲181,285	▼120,035
Estonia	▼105,584	▲540,062	▲496,582	▼432,803	▲433,926
Latvia	▼93,865	▲365,783	▲355,641	▼330,266	▲360,603
Stateless persons	▼74,215	▼303,851	▲327,613	▼318,393	▼321,383
South Ossetia	▼70,470	▲147,355	▲143,501	▲137,427	▼115,382
Germany	▼69,456	▲744,473	▲701,576	▲629,082	▲613,370
Lithuania	▼57,883	▲253,950	▼243,190	▼256,009	▲281,168
Mongolia	▼56,625	▼394,994	▼401,485	▼416,293	▲542,196
Georgia	▼56,266	▼120,086	▲123,732	▲117,204	▼65,378
India	▼46,025	▲180,567	▲159,865	▲130,400	▲108,498
South Korea	▼42,297	▲453,796	▲386,413	▲276,560	▲181,024
France	▼38,391	▲249,410	▲236,583	▲211,673	▲201,260
Israel	▼32,402	▲260,472	▲228,530	▲185,426	▲182,438
Italy	▼28,432	▲251,751	▲225,776	▼206,860	▲208,689
Serbia	▼26,731	▼84,852	▲96,730	▲87,899	▲79,575
United Kingdom	▼22,471	▼194,956	▲216,029	▲193,522	▼190,278
Turkmenistan	▼21,680	▲92,616	▲82,675	▲65,749	▲56,258
Vietnam	▼19,477	▲90,565	▲84,612	▲77,391	▲66,939
United States	▼19,306	▼300,933	▲337,395	▲293,011	▲248,990
Japan	▼16,048	▲127,696	▲119,240	▲114,207	▲95,675
Netherlands	▼14,663	▲84,651	▲80,540	▲73,729	▲68,017
Egypt	▼13,481	▼28,039	▲39,402		
Iran	▼12,725	▼54,469	▼61,007	▲91,862	▲75,203
Thailand	▼12,183	▲72,031	▲64,898	▲52,697	▲32,222
Greece	▼11,732	▲44,784	▲42,967	▼41,205	▲46,730
Bulgaria	▼10,255	▲41,083	▲40,836	▼39,191	▲41,290
Austria	▼9,977	▲67,429	▲64,500	▲59,501	▼56,663
Czech Republic	▼9,874	▲57,835	▲53,739	▲49,232	▲47,288
Indonesia	▼9,671	▲40,284	▲31,695	▲25,425	▲20,211
Spain	▼9,565	▲140,181	▲123,652	▲118,642	▲116,032
Romania	▼9,335	▲32,779	▲29,920	▲26,330	▼23,684
Norway	▼8,506	▲52,022	▼51,003	▲53,197	▼46,631
Sweden	▼8,308	▼43,198	▲55,329	▼32,095	▼39,153
Belgium	▼7,534	▼42,473	▲48,270	▲38,868	▲37,492
Croatia	▼7,480	▼19,243	▲36,045		
Switzerland	▼7,407	▼55,747	▲59,828	▲53,167	▲52,656
Cuba	▼6,631	▲29,169	▼27,882	▲30,711	▲26,667
Hungary	▼5,680	▲35,541	▲32,998	▲25,659	▲25,313
Denmark	▼5,016	24,662	▲31,308		
Total	▼ n/a	▲32,866,265	▲32,550,677	▲32,035,443	▼31,466,538

Number of visitors for all purposes by nationality by year (2015–2010)
Nationality	Total					
Nationality	2015	2014	2013	2012	2011	2010
Ukraine	▲10,314,757	▲9,842,990	▲7,080,991	▲6,502,543	▲6,072,775	4,198,030
Kazakhstan	▲5,180,246	▲4,215,161	▲3,848,899	▲3,630,342	▲3,049,406	2,747,358
Uzbekistan	▼2,163,256	▼2,353,140	▲2,967444	▲2,677,322	▲2,086,359	1,584,086
Poland	▼1,766,612	▲1,823,143	▲1,644,657	▲1,190,003	▲704,610	394,872
Finland	▲1,476,412	▲1,446,169	▲1,388,036	▲1,375,614	▲1,211,520	1,012,621
China	▲1,353,051	▲1,125,098	▲1,071,515	▲978,988	▲845,588	747,640
Tajikistan	▼1,200,972	▼1,202,260	▲1,348,868	▲1,134,150	▲955,455	830,160
Azerbaijan	▲1,071,324	▼1,021,204	▲1,196,759	▲1,116,238	▲1,045,525	979,778
Armenia	▲850,137	▼794,098	▲882,864	▲700,332	▲550,349	459,040
Kyrgyzstan	▲842,396	▼725,664	▲763,418	▲623,970	▲592,960	552,909
Moldova	▼770,965	▼923,625	▲1,374,690	▲1,194,291	▲1,073,637	988,084
Germany	▼595,200	▼635,153	▲686,557	▲671,676	▲629,391	611,367
Mongolia	▲505,429	▼225,972	▼226,673	▲365,236	▲212,117	157,367
Belarus	▼424,531	▲495,999	▲418,207	▲372,942	▲267,233	259,191
Abkhazia	▲422,130	▲362,811	▲293,429	▲273,964	▲202,440	52,289
Estonia	▲382,031	▼363,942	▼430,164	▼494,282	▲519,402	474,949
Latvia	▼348,338	▼374,701	▼391,304	▼461,162	▲571,374	569,300
Stateless persons	▼326,841	▼349,400	▼463,640	▼523,333	▼618,705	679,757
Turkey	▼323,039	▼361,416	▲385,147	▲305,429	▲249,109	196,704
Lithuania	▼270,600	▼487,206	▼539,308	▼553,896	▼622,740	760,728
United States	▼242,104	▼257,070	▲305,954	286,551	▲275,239	262,060
Italy	▼204,710	▼219,976	▲225,933	▲212,411	207,476	198,002
France	▼191,643	▼219,210	▲225,860	▲225,343	▲213,473	194,248
United Kingdom	▼190,775	▼228,346	▲259,676	▲231,670	▲221,418	212,847
Israel	▲165,003	▲152,853	▲136,827	▲123,974	▲114,380	100,291
Philippines	▲163,010	▲162,990	▲149,213	▲130,541	▲99,405	81,385
South Korea	▲153,189	▲135,676	▲107,942	▲94,922	▲91,335	90,622
South Ossetia	▲125,444	▲117,283	▲94,159	▲73,863	▲47,739	33,409
Spain	▲110,247	▼100,206	▲109,089	▼101,536	▲129,730	110,601
India	▲95,527	▼94,259	▲95,542	▲80,127	▲60,191	53,364
Japan	▼93,550	▲105,220	▲102,408	▲86,806	▼76,204	78,188
Serbia	▼79,406	▼87,048	▲107,601	▲70,371	▲57,177	47,939
Georgia	▲69,095	▲58,264	▲48,440	▲35,511	▲30,415	24,568
Netherlands	▼63,469	▼80,543	▲86,402	▼81,212	▲87,549	80,720
Vietnam	▼60,882	▼75,840	▲81,073	▲62,961	▲53,529	50,823
Austria	▼57,242	67,392	▲74,277	▲71,863	▲70,388	67,606
Turkmenistan	▲51,170	▲47,002	▼40,238	▲43,720	▲39,579	35,017
Norway	▼49,535	▲57,423	▲54,433	▲50,115	▲48,614	45,340
Iran.	▲46,760	▲29,743	▼20,657	▲23,085	▲21,575	20,576
Czech Republic	▼46,432	▼68,875	▲76,530	▲62,980	▲46,776	40,565
Switzerland	▼46,200	▼50,838	▲54,898	▲52,852	▲47,978	44,964
Canada	▼43,663	▼53,370	▲61,234	▲54,730	▲52,238	48,559
Greece	▼41,210	▼46,450	▲48,280	▲36,474	▲33,569	33,396
Sweden	▼40,424	▼49,908	▲53,340	▼58,900	▲60,840	54,253
Australia	▼39,613	▼46,072	▲46,861	▲43,105	▲34,868	30,583
Bulgaria	▼37,035	▼42,230	▲47,154	▲45,312	▲42,031	38,446
Brazil	▲35,531	▼33,301	▲37,386	▲33,647	▲29,840	21,950
Belgium	▼33,714	▼37,441	▲40,316	▲37,025	▲36,430	33,571
Thailand	▲29,482	▲25,585	▲23,919	▲19,375	▲17,023	15,192
Romania	▼25,970	▼28,391	▲30,886	▲24,792	▲21,993	17,884
Hungary	▼24,849	▲28,421	▲27,155	▼23,047	▲23,241	20,736
Mexico	▲22,922	▼18,223	▲21,527	▼16,431	▲16,759	13,767
North Korea	▼20,893	▲23,902	▲23,604	▲22,071	▼18,901	21,167
Slovakia	▼19,876	▼24,962	▲27,554	▲24,161	▲20,445	18,512
Indonesia	▼18,100	▼20,330	▲21,088	▲18,572	▲18,313	14,448
Argentina	▲17,322	▼13,614	▲15,944	▲13,976	▲12,316	9,044
Portugal	▲15,475	▲15,181	▼14,952	▼15,398	▼15,814	18,434
Cuba	▲12,349	▲11,609	▲9,625	▲5,293	▲4,099	4,053
Total	▲33,729,187	▲32,421,490	▲30,792,091	▲28,176,502	▲24,932,016	▲22,281,217

== Historical visa statistics ==
The following is a list of the 10 countries to whose citizens were issued the most Russian electronic visas: Issuance of e-visas was suspended from 2020 to 2023.

Country	2024	2023
China	311,839	86,619
Saudi Arabia	63,218	8,915
Germany	52,425	11,335
Turkey	42,202	9,865
India	32,145	9,456
Estonia	25,404	13,318
Latvia	19,410	5,137
Kuwait	16,982	3,924
Iran	16,973	3,276
Lithuania	10,121	3,107
Total	670,947	170,104

The following is a list of the 10 countries to whose citizens were issued the most Russian visas:

Country	Number of visas issued in					
Country	2020	2019	2018	2017	2016	2015
Germany	58,953	410,780	360,582	336,423	324,959	299,791
China	41,280	453,338	406,831	371,489	339,030	357,040
Turkey	34,162	83,169	81,177	79,898	45,209	33,698
France	27,059	172,870	146,491	145,576	131,229	119,314
United Kingdom	20,770	92,573	88,290	96,246	93,169	87,863
Italy	18,272	162,529	139,797	129,124	129,038	117,123
United States	16,736	106,250	98,936	95,630	94,682	85,974
Finland	14,271	110,480	105,157	108,792	116,462	112,655
Latvia	11,295	78,727	79,082	74,382	77,574	70,328
Poland	10,535	67,666	62,840	59,187	54,885	43,038
Total	452 161	3,090,538	2,758,893	2,687,146	2,505,457	2,283,850

== See also ==
- Visa history of Russia
- Internal passport of Russia
- Russian passport
- Resident registration in Russia
- Tourism in Russia
- Visa requirements for Russian citizens
- Service for Citizenship and Registration of Foreign Citizens
- List of diplomatic missions of Russia
- Foreign relations of Russia
- Immigration to Russia
- Illegal immigration to Russia
- Emigration from Russia
