= Balvi district =

District of Latvia

Coordinates: 57°07′48″N 27°15′50″E

Balvi Balvu rajons
- District
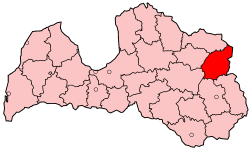
- Country: Latvia
- First established: 1949
- Reformed: 1990
- Abolished: 2009

Area
  - Total: 2,381.2 km^{2} (919.4 sq mi)

Population
  - Total: 27,296
  - Density: 11.463/km^{2} (29.689/sq mi)
- Website: balvi.gov.lv/

Balvi district (Latvian: Balvu rajons) was an administrative division of Latvia, located in Latgale region, in the country's east. It was organized into two cities and nineteen parishes, each with a local government authority. The main city in the district was Balvi.

== History ==
Until 1940, the area was a part of the Abrene county of the Republic of Latvia. After the Soviet occupation of Latvia in 1940, six parishes of the county and the town of Abrene were transferred to the Pskov Oblast of the Russian SFSR. In 1945, the remaining part was renamed Viļaka county. Ultimately, districts were introduced in 1949 by the Soviet occupation authorities to supersede counties – the Viļaka county was split into Abrene district (dissolved in 1959) and Balvi district.

Districts were eliminated during the administrative-territorial reform in 2009. Balvi district was split into Balvi Municipality, Baltinava Municipality, Rugāji Municipality and Viļaka Municipality.

== Cities and parishes in the Balvi district ==
- Baltinava Parish
- Balvi city
- Balvi Parish
- Bērzkalne Parish
- Bērzpils Parish
- Briežuciems Parish
- Krišjāņi Parish
- Kubuli Parish
- Kuprava Parish
- Lazdukalns Parish
- Lazduleja Parish
- Medņeva Parish
- Rugāji Parish
- Susāji Parish
- Šķilbēni Parish
- Tilža Parish
- Vectilža Parish
- Vecumi Parish
- Viļaka city
- Vīksna Parish
- Žīguri Parish
