= Viļaka Municipality =

Former municipality of Latvia

Coordinates: 57°10′N 27°40′E

Viļaka Municipality Viļakas novads
- Former municipality
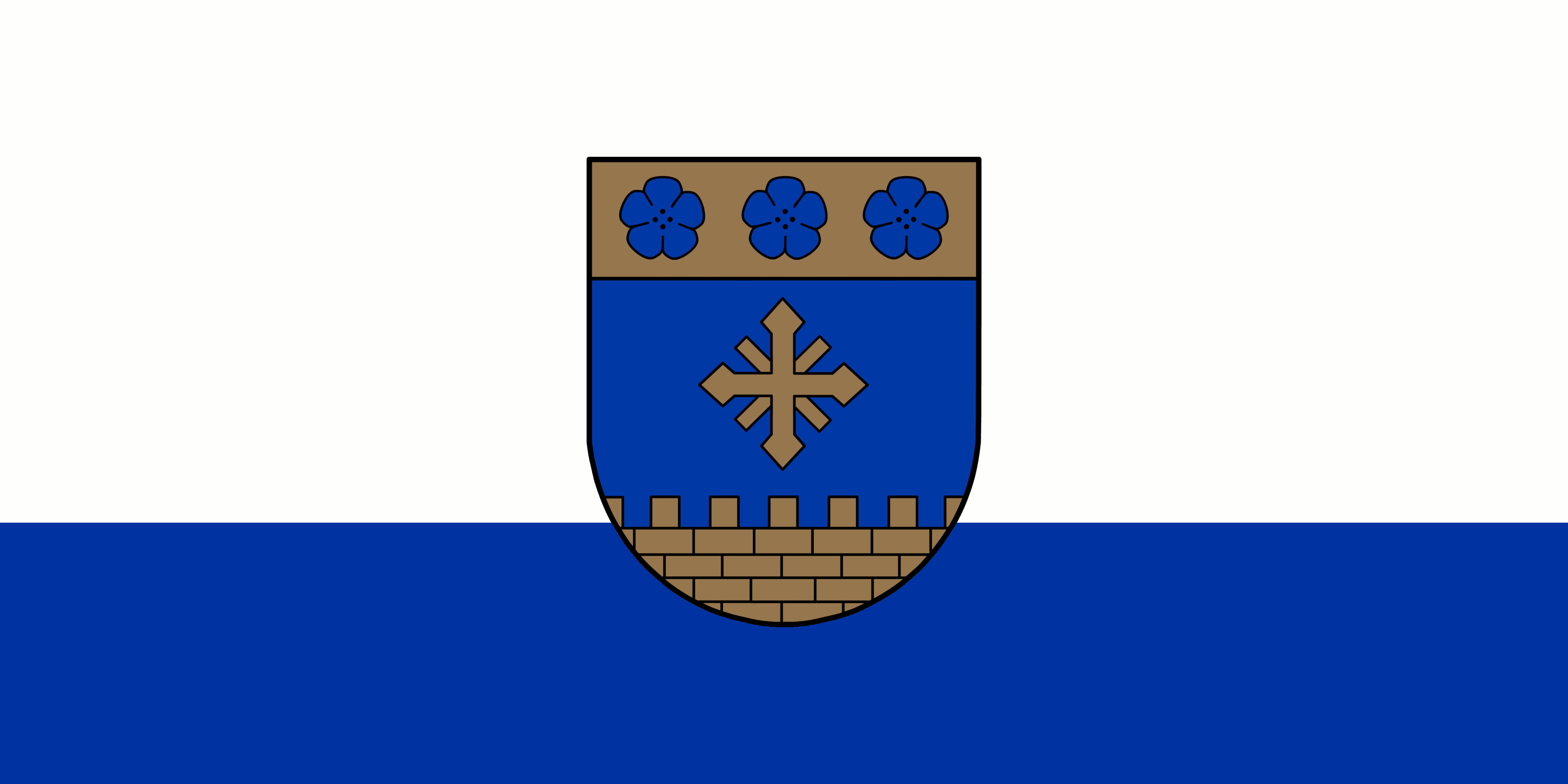
- Flag Coat of arms

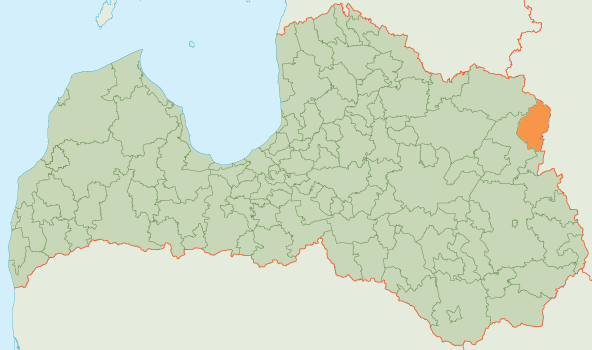
- Country: Latvia
- Formed: 2009
- Dissolved: 2021
- Centre: Viļaka

Government
  - Council Chair (last): Sergejs Maksimovs (Latgale Party)

Area
  - Total: 640.10 km^{2} (247.14 sq mi)
  - Land: 627.92 km^{2} (242.44 sq mi)
  - Water: 12.18 km^{2} (4.70 sq mi)

Population (2021)
  - Total: 4,476
  - Density: 7.128/km^{2} (18.46/sq mi)
- Website: www.vilaka.lv

Viļaka Municipality (Latvian: Viļakas novads, Latgalian: Vileks nūvods) is a former municipality in Latgale, Latvia. The municipality was formed in 2009 by merging parts of the former Balvi district: Kuprava Parish, Medņeva Parish, Susāji Parish, Šķilbēni Parish, Vecumi Parish, Žīguri Parish and Viļaka town.

The administrative centre of the municipality was Viļaka. The population in 2020 was 4,472.

On 1 July 2021, Viļaka Municipality ceased to exist and its territory was merged into Balvi Municipality as its component subdivisions.

== See also ==
- Administrative divisions of Latvia (2009)
