= Ančipova =

Village in Latvia

- Village
- Location in Latvia
- Coordinates: 57°02′31″N 27°43′44″E
- Country: Latvia
- Municipality: Balvi Municipality

Population (2015)
  - Total: 14
- Time zone: UTC+2 (EET)
  - Summer (DST): UTC+3 (EEST)
- Postal code: LV-4587

Ančipova is a village in the Šķilbēni Parish of Balvi Municipality in the Latgale region of Latvia. It is located in the eastern part of the parish, 8.6 km (5.3 mi) from the parish center Rekova, 13.1 km (8.1 mi) from Viļaka, and 254.7 km (158.3 mi) from Riga.

Ančipova is located very close to the Russian border, away from the state roads, on the bank of the border river Kukhva.
