= Sild =

Sild may refer to:

- Sild (surname), an Estonian name
- Sild (island), Danish name for the German island of Sylt
- Sild, Estonian name of The Bridge, Estonian-Russian television series

== See also ==
- Spekesild, salted herring
- Sylt (disambiguation)
