= Baltinava Municipality =

Former municipality of Latvia

Coordinates: 56°57′N 27°39′E

Baltinava Municipality Baltinavas novads
- Former municipality
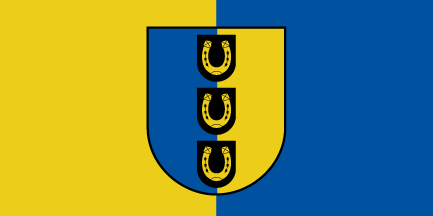
- Flag Coat of arms

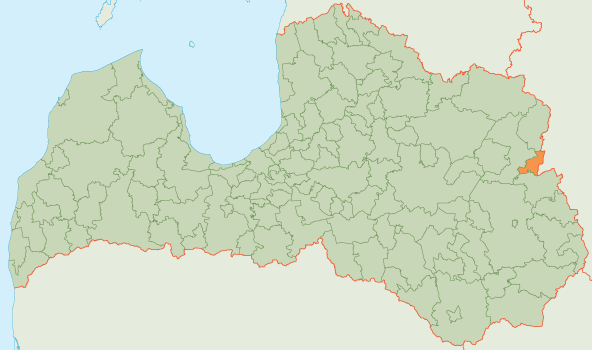
- Country: Latvia
- Formed: 2009
- Dissolved: 2021
- Centre: Baltinava

Government
  - Chairwoman (last): Sarmīte Tabore (We - For Baltinava)

Area
  - Total: 186.27 km^{2} (71.92 sq mi)
  - Land: 183.13 km^{2} (70.71 sq mi)
  - Water: 3.14 km^{2} (1.21 sq mi)

Population (2021)
  - Total: 937
  - Density: 5.12/km^{2} (13.3/sq mi)
- Website: www.baltinava.lv

Baltinava Municipality (Latvian: Baltinavas novads) is a former municipality in Latgale, Latvia. The administrative centre was Baltinava. The municipality was formed in 2009 by reorganization of Baltinava parish of Balvi district.

The municipality was located in the northeast of the country and bordered with Viļaka municipality in the north, Pytalovsky District of Pskov Oblast of Russia in the east, Kārsava municipality in the south, and Balvi municipality in the west.

On 1 July 2021, Baltinava Municipality ceased to exist and its territory was merged into Balvi Municipality as Baltinava parish.

== See also ==
- Administrative divisions of Latvia (2009)
