= Rugāji =

Village in Balvi, Latgale, Latvia

- Village
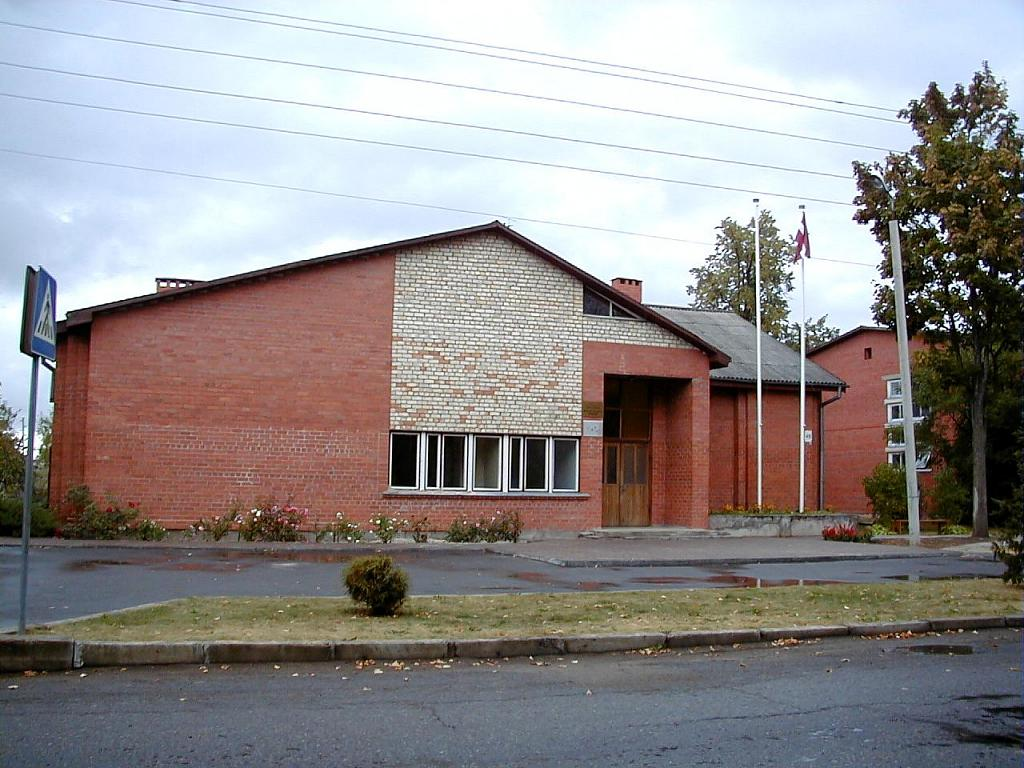
- Town hall in Rugāji

- Rugāji's location in Latvia
- Coordinates: 57°0′3.38″N 27°7′46.89″E
- Country: Latvia
- Municipality: Balvi
- Parish: Rugāji
- Founded: 1922

Population (2006)
  - Total: 547

Rugāji (Latvian: Rugāji; Latgalian: Ruguoji) is a village in Rugāji Parish, Balvi Municipality in the Latgale region of Latvia.
