= Baltinava Parish =

Parish of Latvia

Coordinates: 56°57′N 27°39′E

Baltinava Parish (Latvian: Baltinavas pagasts) is an administrative territorial entity of Balvi Municipality in the Latgale region of Latvia. The parish seat is Baltinava. The population in 2024 was 894.

Previously, it the parish was a part of the former Jaunlatgale (Abrene) county from 1920 to 1945, Viļaka county from 1945 to 1949, Kārsava district from 1949 to 1962 and Balvi district from 1962 to 2009. Following the administrative territorial reform of Latvia in 2009, it was reorganized into Baltinava Municipality, which was merged into Balvi Municipality in 2021.
