= Susāji Parish =

Parish of Latvia

- parish of Latvia
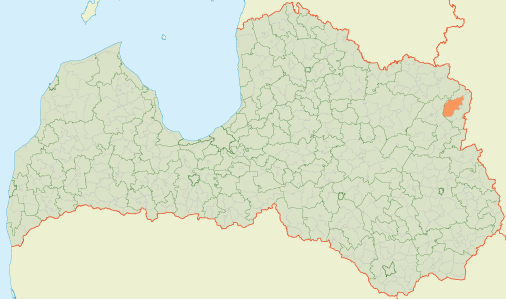
- Coordinates: 57°11′28″N 27°34′12″E
- Country: Latvia

Population (1 January 2026)
  - Total: 410

Susāji Parish (Latvian: Susāju pagasts) is an administrative unit of Balvi Municipality in the Latgale region of Latvia. From 1949 to 2009 it was part of Balvi district, and from 2009 to 2021 - of Viļaka Municipality.

== Towns, villages and settlements of Susāji Parish ==
- Viļaka - parish administrative center, located outside of the parish
- Susāji - village that serves as the namesake of the parish
