= Sild (surname) =

Family name

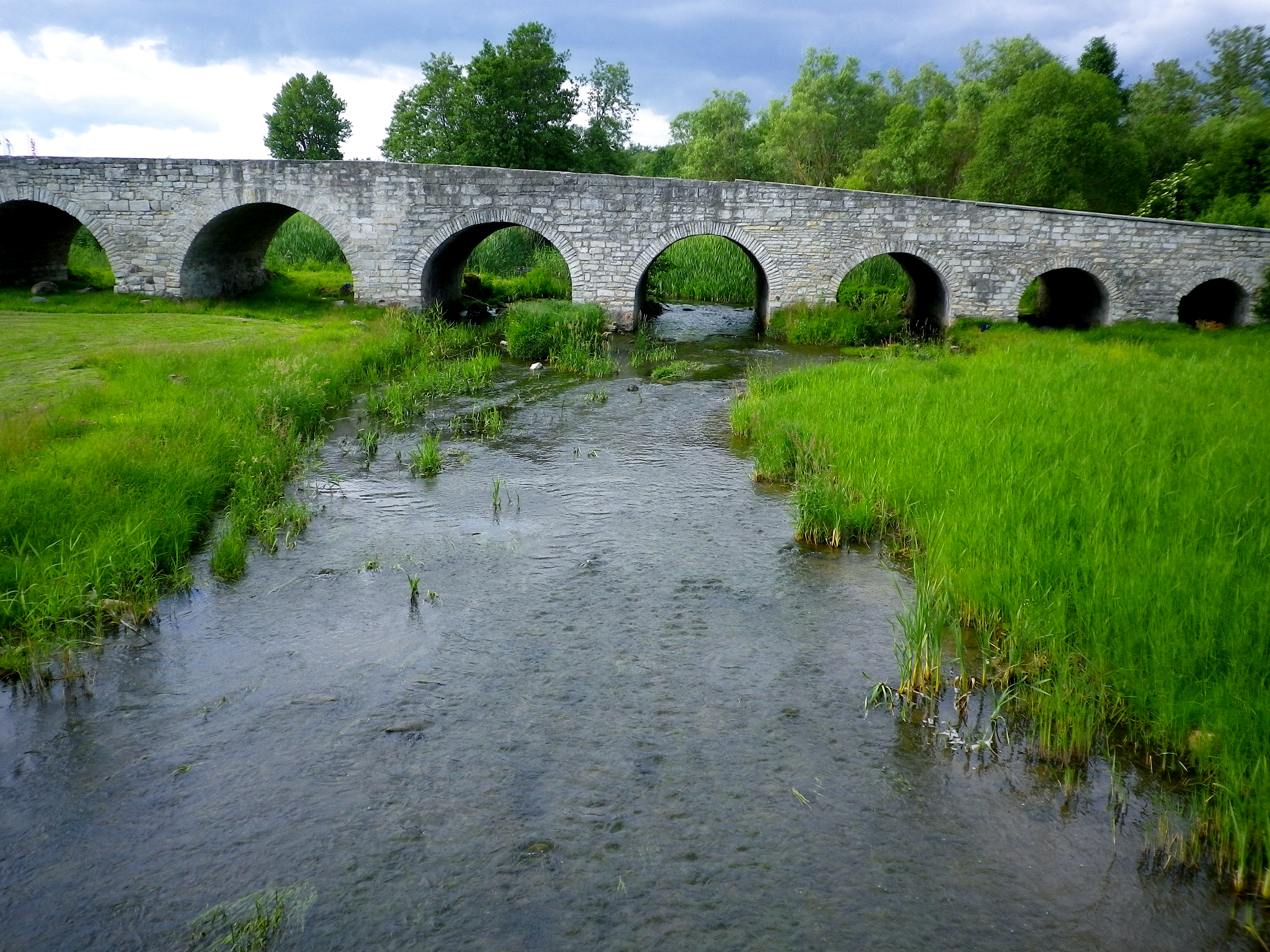
- Kuressaare suursild on the island of Saaremaa in Estonia

Origin
- Language: Estonian
- Meaning: "bridge"
- Region of origin: Estonia

Sild is an Estonian language surname meaning "bridge".

As of 1 January 2021, 524 men and 544 women in Estonia have the surname Sild. Sild is ranked the 65th most common surname for men in Estonia and 61st for women. The surname Sild is most common in Viljandi County, where 21.55 per 10,000 inhabitants of the county bear the surname.

Notable people bearing the surname Sild include:

- Arno Sild (born 1947), politician
- Eili Sild (1942–2026), actress
- Heino Sild (1944–2009), shot putter
- Lauri Sild (born 1990), orienteer
- Sixten Sild (born 1964), orienteer
- Timo Sild (born 1988), orienteer
