= Balvi =

Town and capital of Balvi Municipality, Latvia

Balvi Latgalian: Bolvi
- Town
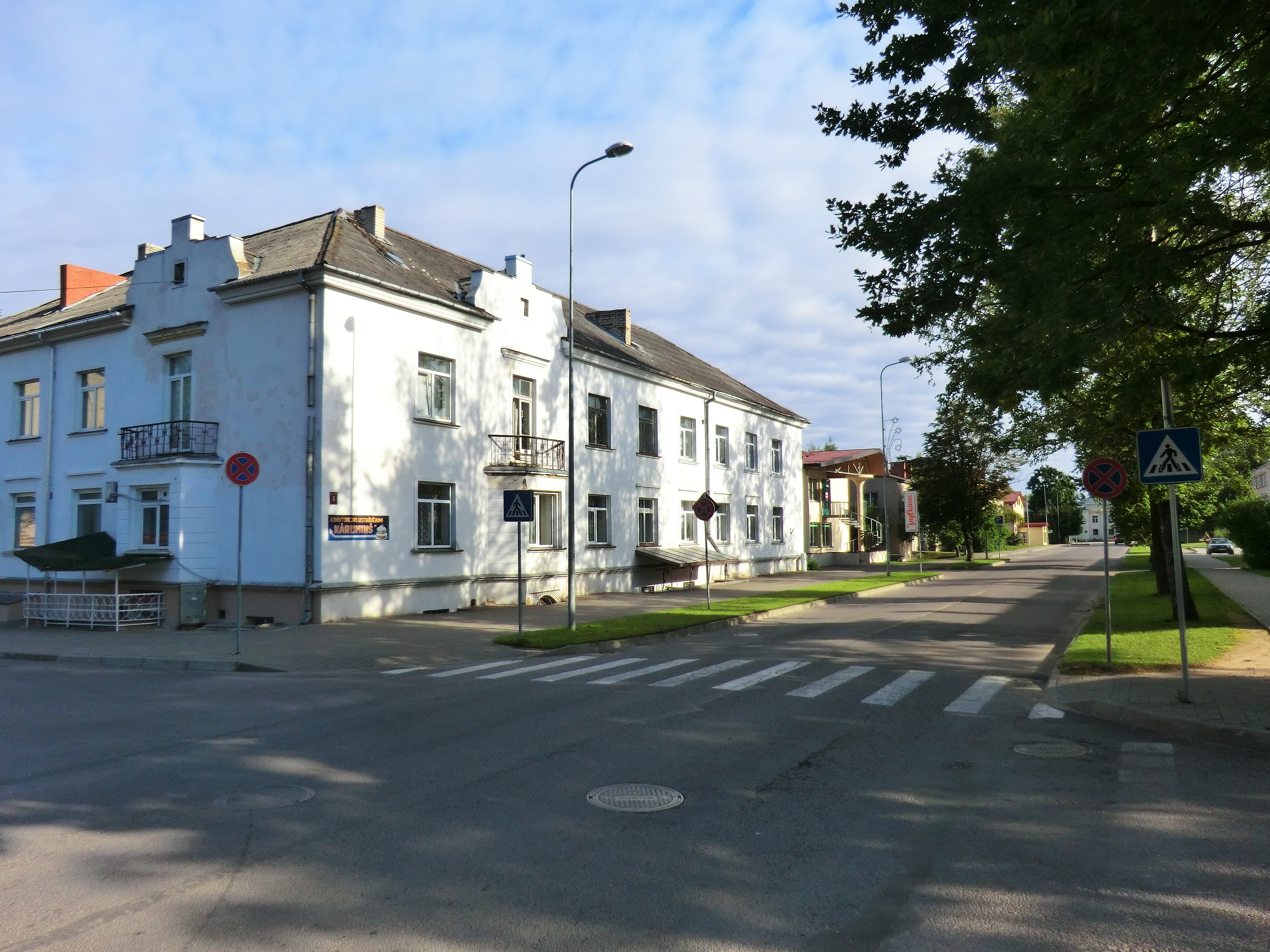
- Bērzpils street in Balvi

- Flag Coat of arms

- Location in Latvia
- Coordinates: 57°8′N 27°15′E
- Country: Latvia
- Municipality: Balvi Municipality
- Town rights: 1928

Area
  - Total: 5.07 km^{2} (1.96 sq mi)
  - Land: 4.97 km^{2} (1.92 sq mi)
  - Water: 0.1 km^{2} (0.039 sq mi)
- Elevation: 113 m (371 ft)

Population (2026)
  - Total: 5,500
  - Density: 1,100/km^{2} (2,900/sq mi)
- Time zone: UTC+2 (EET)
  - Summer (DST): UTC+3 (EEST)
- Postal code: LV-4501
- Calling code: +371 645
- Number of municipal council members: 15
- Website: www.balvi.lv

Balvi (Latgalian: Bolvi, Polish Bołowsk) is a town and the center of Balvi Municipality in the Latgale region of Latvia. It was the administrative seat of the district of the same name since 1949; prior to the occupation of Latvia, it was part of Abrene County. The name derives from the stream Bolupīte and the adjacent lake.

== History ==
The first mention of Balvi dates back to 1224. A small wooden church and manor were constructed on the estate of a Polish noblewoman Konstancija Hilsena at the site ca. 1765. When Latgale came under Russian rule in 1772, the estate was granted to the Yelagin family by Catherine II. In 1806, it was passed to the Horozhinsky family, and in 1876, the estate was purchased by the Baltic German Transehe-Roseneck family. The village was separated from the estate in 1915, and Balvi received town rights in 1928, ten years after Latvia proclaimed its independence.

Most of the town's Jews (around 21% of the population) perished in the Stahlecker phase of the Holocaust in August 1941. The retreating Germans set fire to Balvi in July 1944, and the town was rebuilt according to Soviet plans from 1945. Balvi was a center of the Singing Revolution and is vital to Latgalian culture today. The town library in particular is the focus of many cultural events.

== Demographics of Balvi ==
Demographics in Balvi
Latvians	75.26%
Russians	23.27%
Belarusians	1.16%
Ukrainians	1.7%
Poles	1.4%
Roma	0.4%
Germans	0.31%
Others	3.48%

== Notable people ==
- Mikhail Alexandrovich (1914 in Balvi Municipality – 2002), a Jewish tenor and cantor
- Juris Cibuļs (born 1951 in Viļaka Municipality), publicist, humanist, linguist and translator.
- Sarmite Sild (born 1962 in Kubuli Parish). a Latvian-Estonian orienteer.
- Jānis Bordāns (born 1967 in Balvi), politician, lawyer, Minister of Justice, 2019 – 2022.
- Inese Laizāne (1971 in Balvi - 2024), politician and actress
- Arvis Vilkaste (born 1989 in Balvi), bobsledder, team silver medallist at the 2014 Winter Olympics
