= Rugāji Municipality =

Municipality of Latvia

Coordinates: 57°00′03″N 27°07′47″E

Rugāji Municipality Rugāju novads
- Municipality
- Coat of arms

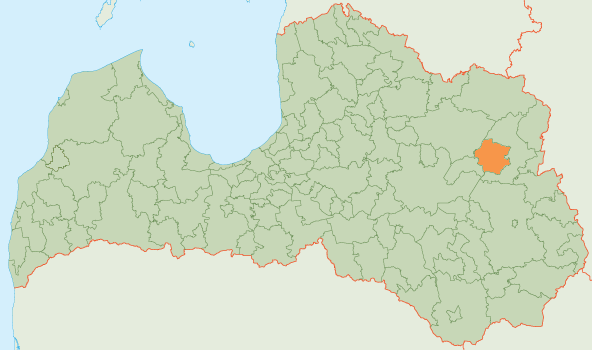
- Country: Latvia
- Formed: 2009
- Dissolved: 2021
- Centre: Rugāji

Government
  - Council Chair: Sandra Kapteine (United for the Municipality)

Area
  - Total: 514.88 km^{2} (198.80 sq mi)
  - Land: 504.56 km^{2} (194.81 sq mi)
  - Water: 10.32 km^{2} (3.98 sq mi)

Population (2021)
  - Total: 2,026
  - Density: 4.015/km^{2} (10.40/sq mi)
- Website: www.rugaji.lv

Rugāji Municipality (Latvian: Rugāju novads; Latgalian: Ruguoju nūvods) is a former municipality in Latgale, Latvia. The municipality was formed in 2009 by merging Rugāji Parish and Lazdukalns Parish, the administrative centre being Rugāji. The population in 2020 was 2,061.

On 1 July 2021, Rugāji Municipality ceased to exist and its territory was merged into Balvi Municipality.

== See also ==
- Administrative divisions of Latvia (2009)
