= Sarmite Sild =

Latvian-Estonian orienteer

Sarmite Sild (until 1987 Gabrane; born 11 January 1962) is a Latvian-Estonian orienteer.

She was born in Kubuļi, Latvia.

She started her orienteering exercising under the guidance of Arvids Šnepers. 1981-1983 she won two gold and one silver medal at Soviet Union Championships. She is 6-times Latvian champion and 2-times Estonian champion.

== Personal life ==
Her husband is orienteer Sixten Sild. She is a mother of orienteers Timo and Lauri Sild.
