= Baltinava =

Village in Latvia

- Village
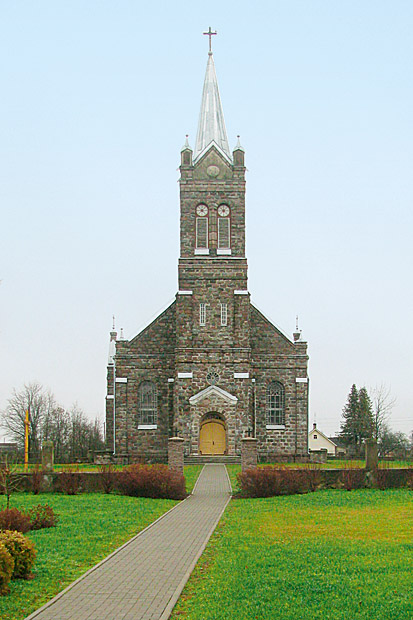
- Baltinava Catholic Church

- Baltinava's location in Latvia
- Coordinates: 56°56′42.68″N 27°38′45.73″E
- Country: Latvia
- Municipality: Balvi
- Parish: Baltinava Parish

Population (2021)
  - Total: 443

Baltinava is a village and the center of Baltinava Parish, Balvi Municipality in the Latgale region of Latvia. It is first mentioned in written sources in 1760 and formed around the Baltinava Manor. The population in 2021 was 443.
