= Lazduleja Parish =

Parish of Latvia

- parish of Latvia
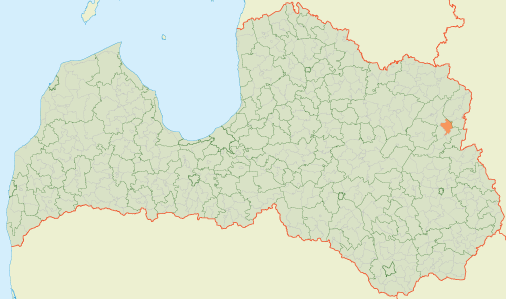
- 57°01′56″N 27°28′30″E

- Location within Latvia
- Country: Latvia

Area
  - Total: 86.92 km^{2} (33.56 sq mi)
  - Land: 83.94 km^{2} (32.41 sq mi)
  - Water: 2.98 km^{2} (1.15 sq mi)

Population (1 January 2026)
  - Total: 208
  - Density: 2.48/km^{2} (6.42/sq mi)

Lazduleja Parish (Latvian: Lazdulejas pagasts) is an administrative unit of Balvi Municipality in the Latgale region of Latvia. Prior to the 2009 administrative reform it was part of Balvi district.
