= Krišjāņi Parish =

Parish of Latvia

- parish of Latvia
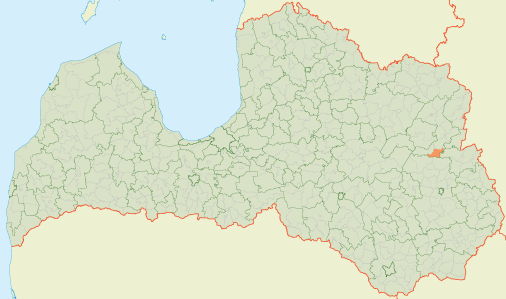
- 56°49′09″N 27°17′41″E
- Country: Latvia

Area
  - Total: 71.12 km^{2} (27.46 sq mi)
  - Land: 69.25 km^{2} (26.74 sq mi)
  - Water: 1.87 km^{2} (0.72 sq mi)

Population (1 January 2026)
  - Total: 287
  - Density: 4.14/km^{2} (10.7/sq mi)

Krišjāņi Parish (Latvian: Krišjāņu pagasts) is an administrative unit of Balvi Municipality in the Latgale region of Latvia (Prior to the 2009 reforms it was part of Balvi district).
