= Tilža Parish =

Parish of Latvia

- parish of Latvia
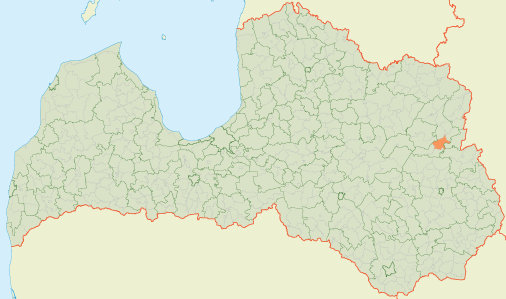
- 56°53′50″N 27°22′12″E
- Country: Latvia

Area
  - Total: 104.33 km^{2} (40.28 sq mi)
  - Land: 102.82 km^{2} (39.70 sq mi)
  - Water: 1.51 km^{2} (0.58 sq mi)

Population (1 January 2024)
  - Total: 799
  - Density: 7.7/km^{2} (20/sq mi)

Tilža Parish (Latvian: Tilžas pagasts) is an administrative unit of Balvi Municipality in the Latgale region of Latvia (Before the 2009 reforms it was in Balvi district).

Tilža (Latvia)
