= Briežuciems Parish =

Parish of Latvia

- parish of Latvia
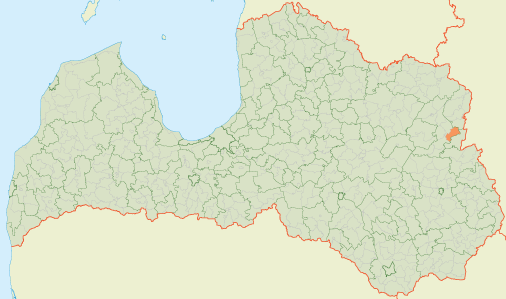
- 56°58′22″N 27°33′12″E
- Country: Latvia

Area
  - Total: 83.65 km^{2} (32.30 sq mi)
  - Land: 82.6 km^{2} (31.9 sq mi)
  - Water: 1.05 km^{2} (0.41 sq mi)

Population (1 January 2024)
  - Total: 431
  - Density: 5.2/km^{2} (13/sq mi)

Briežuciems Parish (Latvian: Briežuciema pagasts) is an administrative unit of Balvi Municipality in the Latgale region of Latvia (Prior to the 2009 administrative reforms it was part of Balvi district).
