= Vecumi Parish =

Parish of Latvia

- parish of Latvia
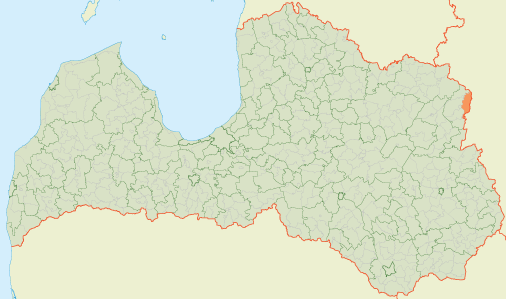
- Coordinates: 57°12′43″N 27°47′12″E
- Country: Latvia

Population (1 January 2026)
  - Total: 333
- Time zone: Eastern European Time

Vecumi Parish (Latvian: Vecumu pagasts) is an administrative unit of Balvi Municipality in the Latgale region of Latvia. Prior to 2009, it was part of the former Balvi district.

== Towns, villages and settlements of Vecumi Parish ==
- Borisova, Latvia -parish administrative center
