= Lazdukalns Parish =

Parish of Latvia

- parish of Latvia
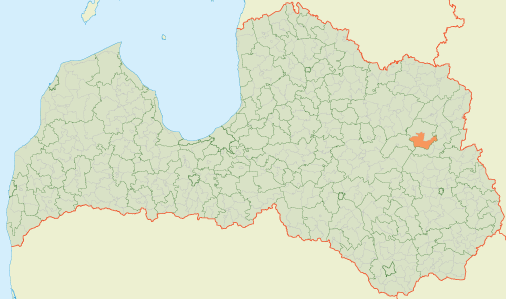
- Coordinates: 56°55′25″N 27°06′06″E
- Country: Latvia

Population (1 January 2026)
  - Total: 699

Lazdukalns Parish (Latvian: Lazdukalna pagasts) is an administrative unit of Balvi Municipality in the Latgale region of Latvia (Prior to the 2009 administrative reforms it was part of Balvi district).
