= Sylt (disambiguation) =

Sylt may refer to:

== Places ==
- Sylt, an island in the district of Nordfriesland, in Schleswig-Holstein, Germany
  - Sylt (municipality), a municipality on the island of Sylt in Germany
  - Sylt-Ost, a former municipality on the island of Sylt in Germany
  - Landschaft Sylt, an Amt ("collective municipality") in the district of Nordfriesland, in Schleswig-Holstein, Germany
  - Sylt Airport, in Westerland, the capital of the island of Sylt in Germany
- Lager Sylt, a Nazi concentration camp on the island of Alderney during the occupation of the Channel Islands during World War II

== Businesses ==
- Sylt Air, an airline based in Germany that operates flights to the island of Sylt

== Ships ==
- MV Sylt, a Kriegsmarine tanker
- SS Sylt, a German merchant (and later Kriegsmarine) coaster
