= Lauri Sild =

Estonian orienteer

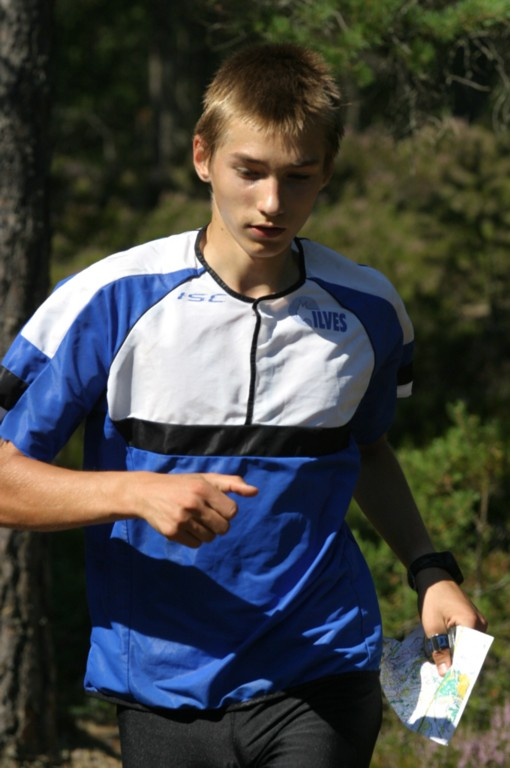
Lauri Sild in 2006

Lauri Sild (born 28 May 1990) is an Estonian orienteer.

He was born in Valga. His parents are orienteers Sixten Sild of Estonia and Sarmite Sild of Latvia, and his older brother is the orienteer Timo Sild. In 2014 he graduated from the University of Tartu's Institute of Physical Education.

He started his orienteering exercises in 1997, coached by his mother. Since 2009, his coach has been Tiit Tali. 2011-2021 he has competed in World Orienteering Championships; best place is 4th in relay (2017).

He is 20-times Estonian champion.

In 2013, he was named the Best Man Orienteer of Estonia.
