= Sixten Sild =

Estonian orienteer

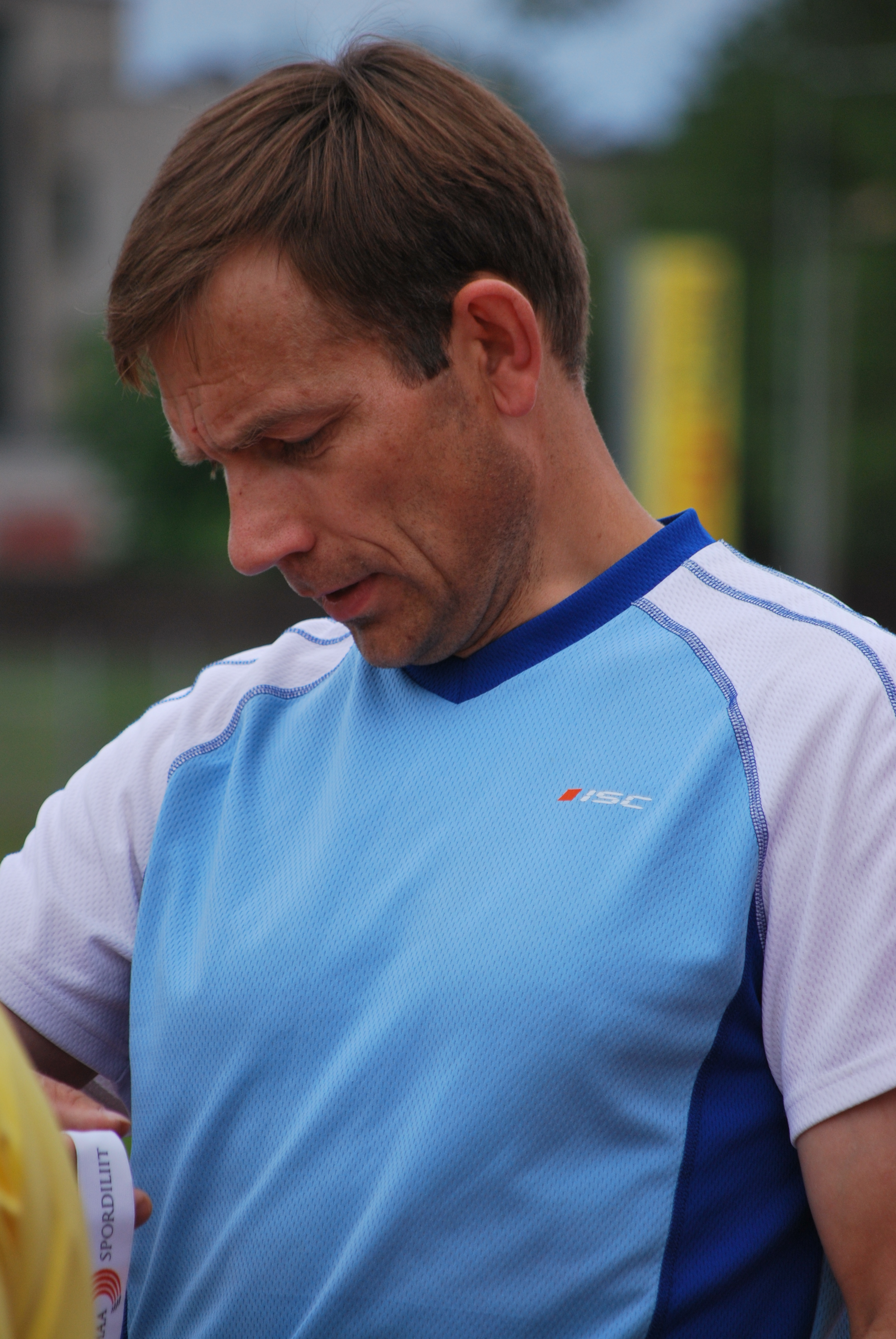

Medal record

Men's orienteering

Representing Soviet Union

World Championships
Bronze medal – third place	1991 Mariánské Lázně	Classic

Sixten Sild (born 19 June 1964, in Tartu) is an Estonian orienteering competitor, bronze medallist for the Soviet Union in the world championships, and later competing for Estonia.

He received a bronze medal in the classic course at the World Orienteering Championships in Mariánské Lázně in 1991. He finished 4th in the relay in 1989, and 5th in 1991 with the Soviet team.

Sild's best overall performance in the Orienteering World Cup was finishing 8th in 1996. Other World Cup overall results: 1990: 16th; 1992: 12th; 1994: 20th; 1998: 24th.

He is married to Latvian orienteer Sarmite Sild and his sons Timo Sild and Lauri Sild are also active orienteers and compete at an international level.

== See also ==
- Estonian orienteers
- List of orienteers
- List of orienteering events
