= Rugāji Parish =

Parish of Latvia

- parish of Latvia
- Coat of arms

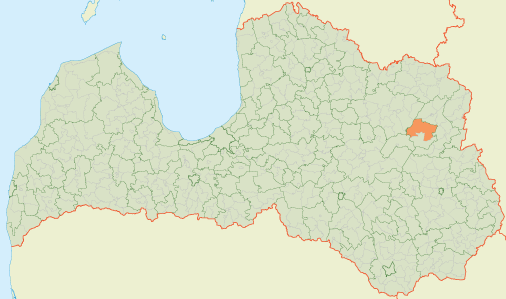
- Coordinates: 57°01′05″N 27°05′47″E
- Country: Latvia

Population (1 January 2026)
  - Total: 1,085

Rugāji Parish (Latvian: Rugāju pagasts; Latgalian: Ruguoju pogosts) is an administrative unit of Balvi Municipality in the Latgale region of Latvia. From 2009 to 2021 it was a part of Rugāji Municipality, but before the 2009 administrative reform – a part of Balvi district.
