= Kuprava Parish =

Parish of Latvia

- parish of Latvia
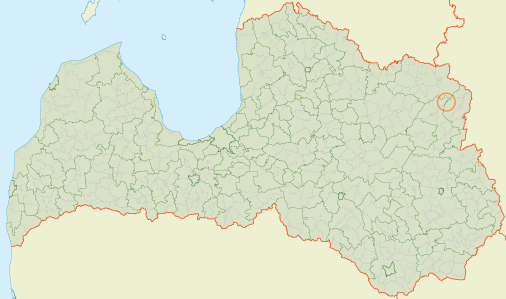
- Coordinates: 57°13′43″N 27°29′12″E
- Country: Latvia

Population (1 January 2026)
  - Total: 205

Kuprava Parish (Latvian: Kupravas pagasts) is an administrative unit of Balvi Municipality in the Latgale region of Latvia.
