= Šķilbēni Parish =

Parish of Latvia

- parish of Latvia
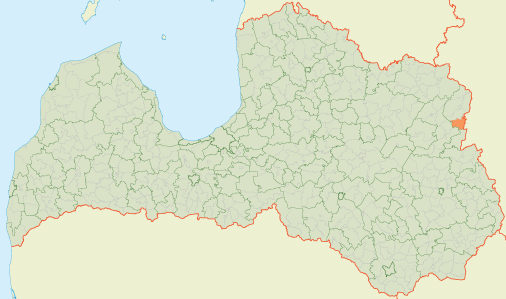
- Coordinates: 57°03′09″N 27°39′13″E
- Country: Latvia

Population (1 January 2026)
  - Total: 813
- Time zone: UTC+02:00

Šķilbēni Parish (Latvian: Šķilbēnu pagasts) is an administrative unit of Balvi Municipality in the Latgale region of Latvia.

== Towns, villages and settlements of Šķilbēni Parish ==
- Rekova - parish administrative center
- Ančipova
