= Žīguri Parish =

Parish of Latvia

- parish of Latvia
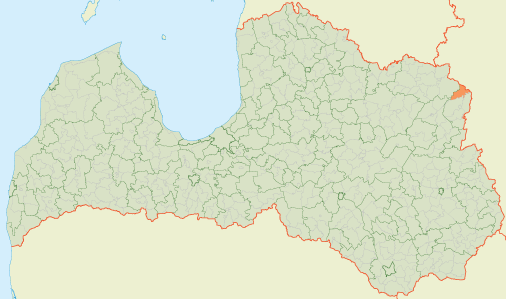
- Coordinates: 57°17′57″N 27°41′48″E
- Country: Latvia

Population (1 January 2026)
  - Total: 470

Žīguri Parish (Latvian: Žīguru pagasts) is an administrative unit of Balvi Municipality in the Latgale region of Latvia.
