= Bērzkalne Parish =

Parish of Latvia

- parish of Latvia
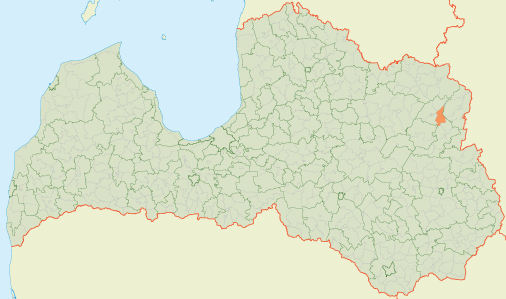
- 57°06′42″N 27°23′05″E
- Country: Latvia

Area
  - Total: 102.74 km^{2} (39.67 sq mi)
  - Land: 101 km^{2} (39 sq mi)
  - Water: 1.74 km^{2} (0.67 sq mi)

Population (1 January 2024)
  - Total: 399
  - Density: 3.9/km^{2} (10/sq mi)

Bērzkalne Parish (Latvian: Bērzkalnes pagasts) is an administrative unit of Balvi Municipality in the Latgale region of Latvia.
