= Balvi Parish =

Parish of Latvia

- parish of Latvia
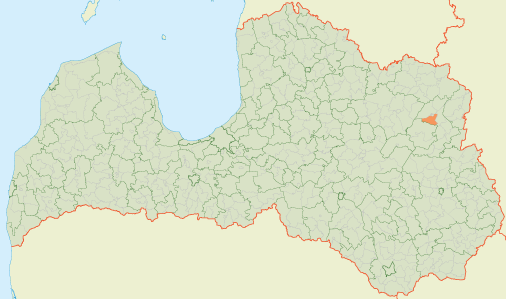
- 57°05′33″N 27°14′19″E
- Country: Latvia

Area
  - Total: 82.78 km^{2} (31.96 sq mi)
  - Land: 81.35 km^{2} (31.41 sq mi)
  - Water: 1.43 km^{2} (0.55 sq mi)

Population (1 January 2024)
  - Total: 631
  - Density: 7.6/km^{2} (20/sq mi)

Balvi Parish (Latvian: Balvu pagasts) is an administrative unit of Balvi Municipality in the Latgale region of Latvia.
