= Vīksna Parish =

Parish of Latvia

- parish of Latvia
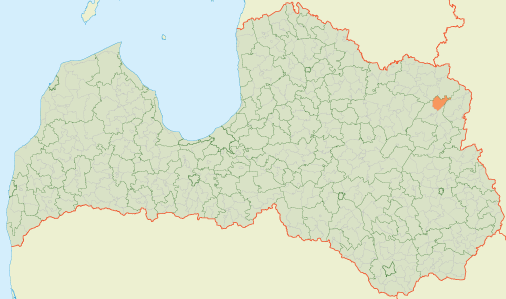
- 57°13′42″N 27°22′56″E
- Country: Latvia

Area
  - Total: 122.04 km^{2} (47.12 sq mi)
  - Land: 119.48 km^{2} (46.13 sq mi)
  - Water: 2.56 km^{2} (0.99 sq mi)

Population (1 January 2025)
  - Total: 496
  - Density: 4.15/km^{2} (10.8/sq mi)

Vīksna Parish (Latvian: Vīksnas pagasts) is an administrative unit of Balvi Municipality in the Latgale region of Latvia.

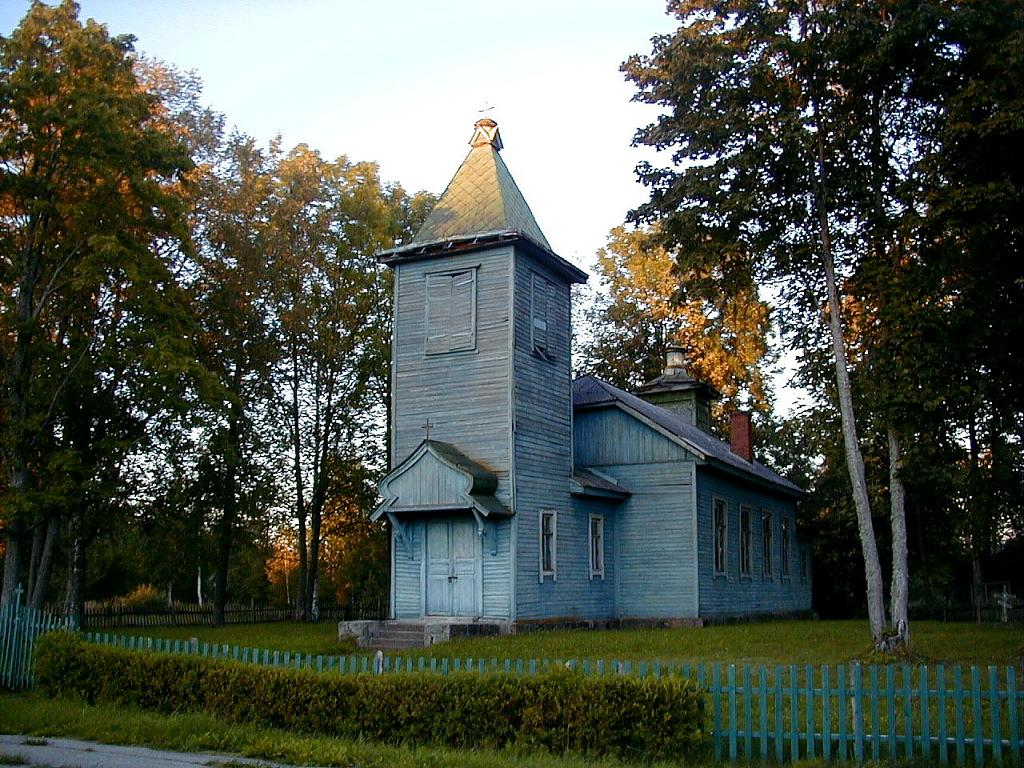
Wooden orthodox church in Vīksna village
