= Bērzpils Parish =

Parish of Latvia

- parish of Latvia
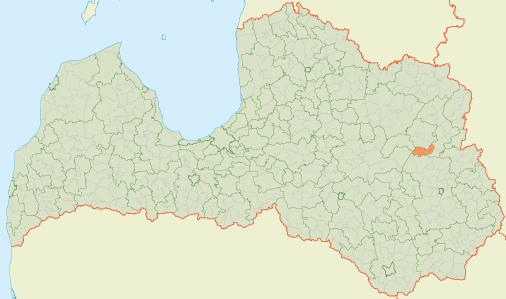
- 56°50′36″N 27°06′37″E
- Country: Latvia

Area
  - Total: 127.75 km^{2} (49.32 sq mi)
  - Land: 124.58 km^{2} (48.10 sq mi)
  - Water: 3.17 km^{2} (1.22 sq mi)

Population (1 January 2024)
  - Total: 581
  - Density: 4.5/km^{2} (12/sq mi)

Bērzpils Parish (Latvian: Bērzpils pagasts) is an administrative unit of Balvi Municipality in the Latgale region of Latvia.
