= Vectilža Parish =

Parish of Latvia

- parish of Latvia
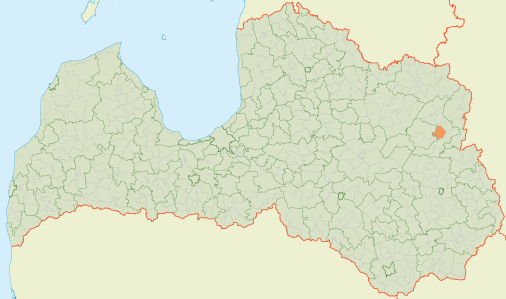
- 56°59′03″N 27°21′34″E
- Country: Latvia

Area
  - Total: 90.96 km^{2} (35.12 sq mi)
  - Land: 89.7 km^{2} (34.6 sq mi)
  - Water: 1.26 km^{2} (0.49 sq mi)

Population (1 January 2025)
  - Total: 357
  - Density: 3.98/km^{2} (10.3/sq mi)

Vectilža Parish (Latvian: Vectilžas pagasts) is an administrative unit of Balvi Municipality in the Latgale region of Latvia.
