= Medņeva Parish =

Parish of Latvia

- parish of Latvia
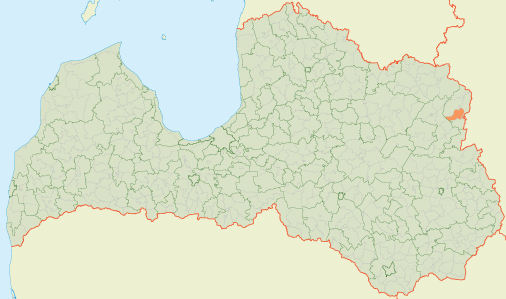
- Coordinates: 57°07′15″N 27°37′24″E
- Country: Latvia

Population (1 January 2026)
  - Total: 492

Medņeva Parish (Latvian: Medņevas pagasts) is an administrative unit of Balvi Municipality in the Latgale region of Latvia.

== Towns, villages and settlements of Medņeva parish ==
- Semenova, Latvia – parish administrative center.
