= Kubuli Parish =

Parish of Latvia

- parish of Latvia
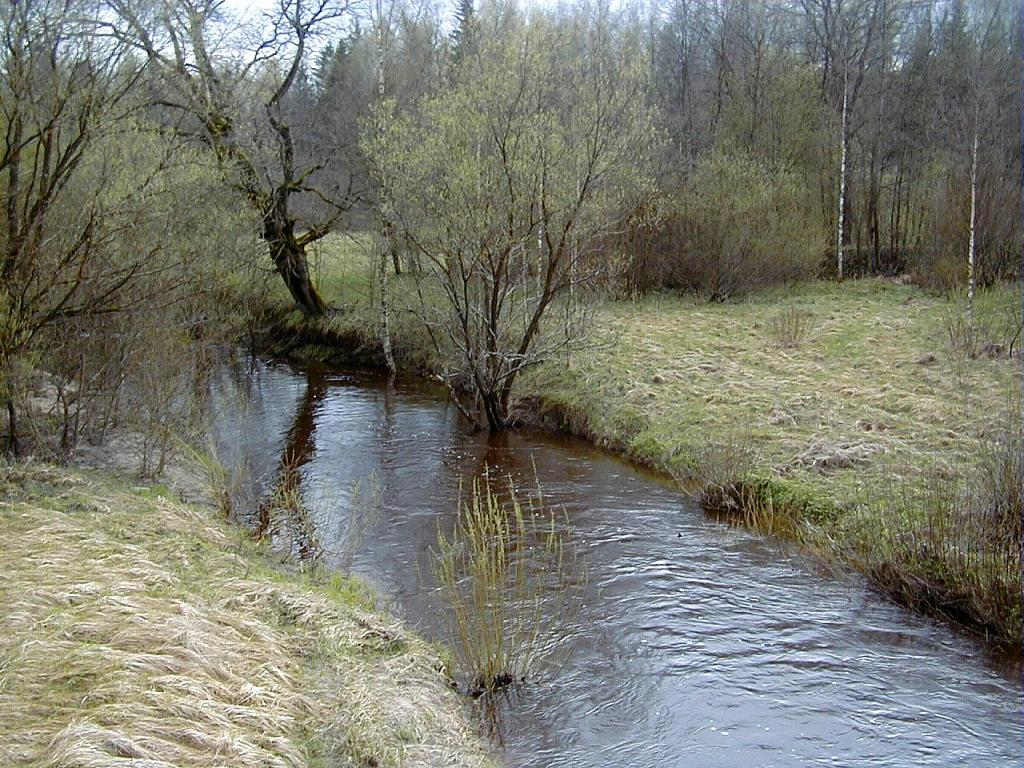

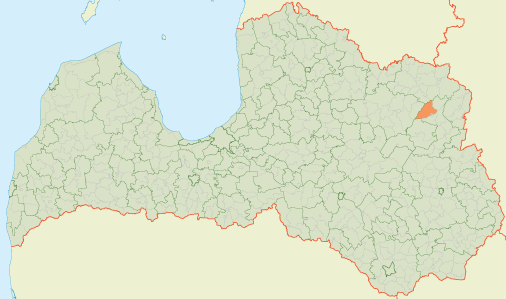
- 57°09′57″N 27°11′00″E
- Country: Latvia

Area
  - Total: 167.67 km^{2} (64.74 sq mi)
  - Land: 161.54 km^{2} (62.37 sq mi)
  - Water: 6.13 km^{2} (2.37 sq mi)

Population (1 January 2025)
  - Total: 1,208
  - Density: 7.478/km^{2} (19.37/sq mi)

Kubuli Parish (Latvian: Kubulu pagasts; until 2011 officially known as Kubuļi parish) is an administrative unit of Balvi Municipality in the Latgale region of Latvia.

== Villages of Kubuli Parish ==
- Kubuli (parish centre)

== See also ==
- Administrative divisions of Latvia (2009)
