= Viļaka =

Town in Balvi Municipality, Latvia

Viļaka Latgalian: Vileks
- Town
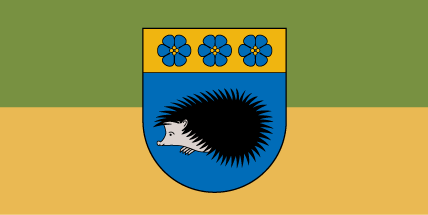
- Flag Coat of arms

- Location in Latvia
- Coordinates: 57°10′N 27°40′E
- Country: Latvia
- Municipality: Balvi Municipality
- Town rights: 1945

Government
  - Mayor: Regīna Brokāne

Area
  - Total: 6.23 km^{2} (2.41 sq mi)
  - Land: 4.79 km^{2} (1.85 sq mi)
  - Water: 1.44 km^{2} (0.56 sq mi)

Population (2026)
  - Total: 1,116
  - Density: 233/km^{2} (603/sq mi)
- Time zone: UTC+2 (EET)
  - Summer (DST): UTC+3 (EEST)
- Postal code: LV-4583
- Calling code: +371 645
- Website: http://www.vilaka.lv

Viļaka (Latvian: Viļaka,; Latgalian: Vileks; German: Marienhausen; Polish: Marienhauz; Russian: Виляка, Vilyaka; Yiddish: ויליאקי, Vilyaki) is a town in Balvi Municipality in the Latgale region of Latvia. The population in 2020 was 1,223. Viļaka is located 246 km from Riga, and 8 km from the border with Russia.

It hosts the power grid interconnector between the Baltic states and Russia, which was disconnected in February 2025.

== See also ==
- List of cities and towns in Latvia
- Viļaka Castle
