= Balvi Municipality =

Municipality of Latvia

Coordinates: 57°08′N 27°15′E

Balvi Municipality Balvu novads Latgalian: Bolvu nūvods
- Municipality
- Flag Coat of arms

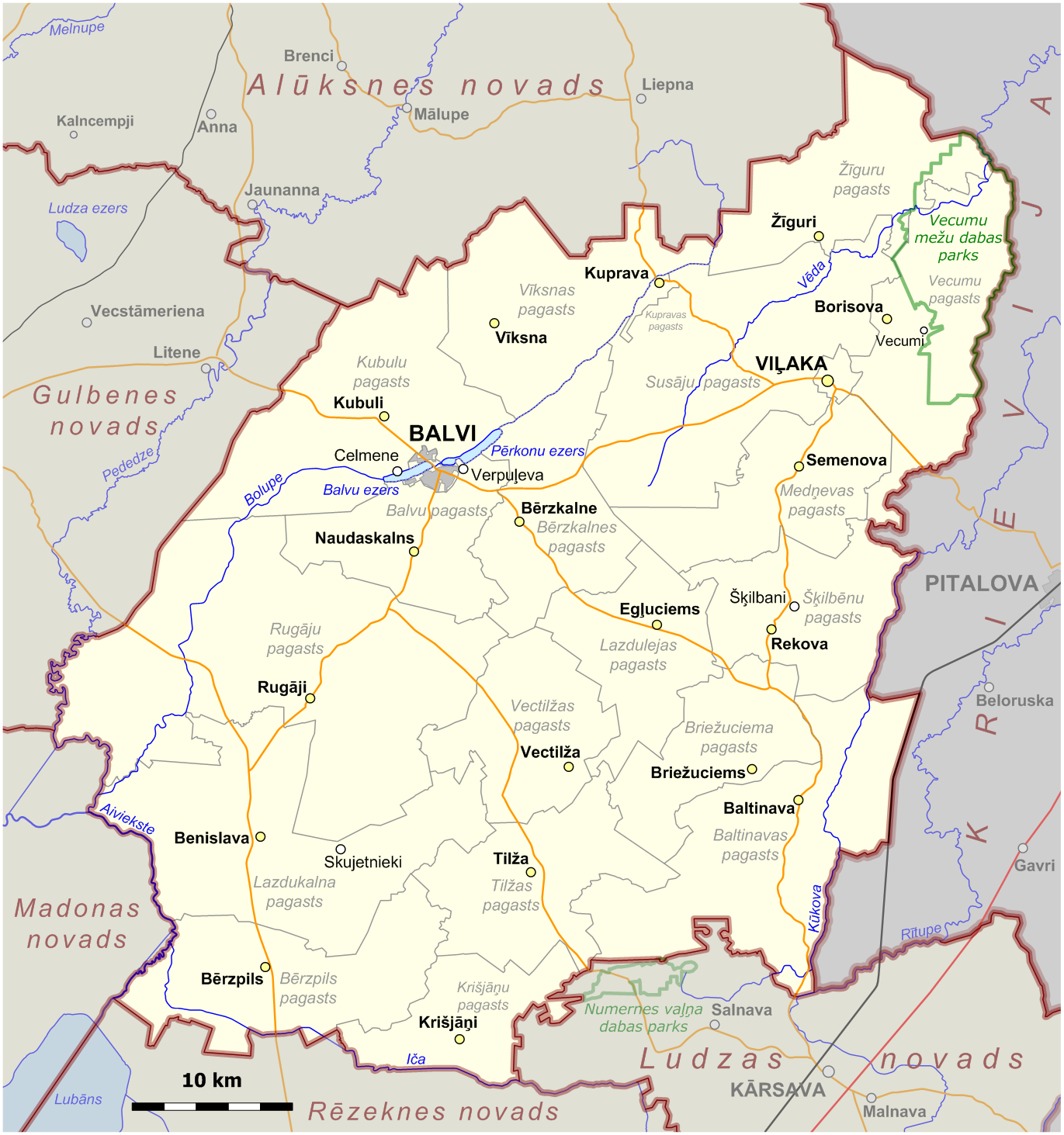
- Country: Latvia
- Formed: 2009
- Reformed: 2021
- Centre: Balvi

Government
  - Council Chair: Sergejs Maksimovs (Latgales partija)

Area
  - Total: 2,386.29 km^{2} (921.35 sq mi)
  - Land: 2,319.39 km^{2} (895.52 sq mi)

Population (2026)
  - Total: 17,163
  - Density: 7.3998/km^{2} (19.165/sq mi)
- Website: www.balvi.lv

Balvi Municipality (Latvian: Balvu novads, Latgalian: Bolvu nūvods) is a municipality in northern Latgale, Latvia. The municipality was formed in 2009 from parts of the Balvi district, by merging Balvi parish, Bērzkalne parish, Bērzpils parish, Briežuciems parish, Krišjāņi parish, Kubuļi parish, Lazduleja parish, Tilža parish, Vectilža parish, Vīksna parish and the town of Balvi, which became the administrative center.

As a part of the 2021 Latvian administrative reform, the municipalities of Balvi, Baltinava, Rugāji and Viļaka were merged into the new Balvi Municipality. Coincidentally, the new municipality shares the same borders as the former Balvi district.

== Images ==
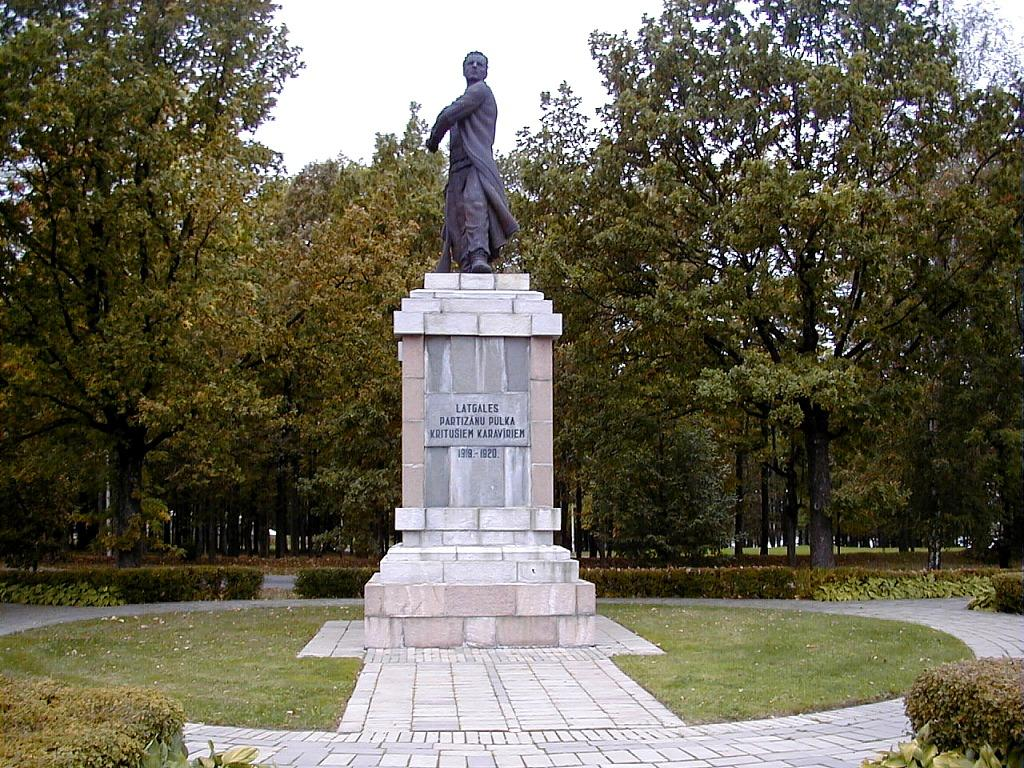
Monument to the Latgale Partisan Regiment of the Latvian War of Independence, Balvi

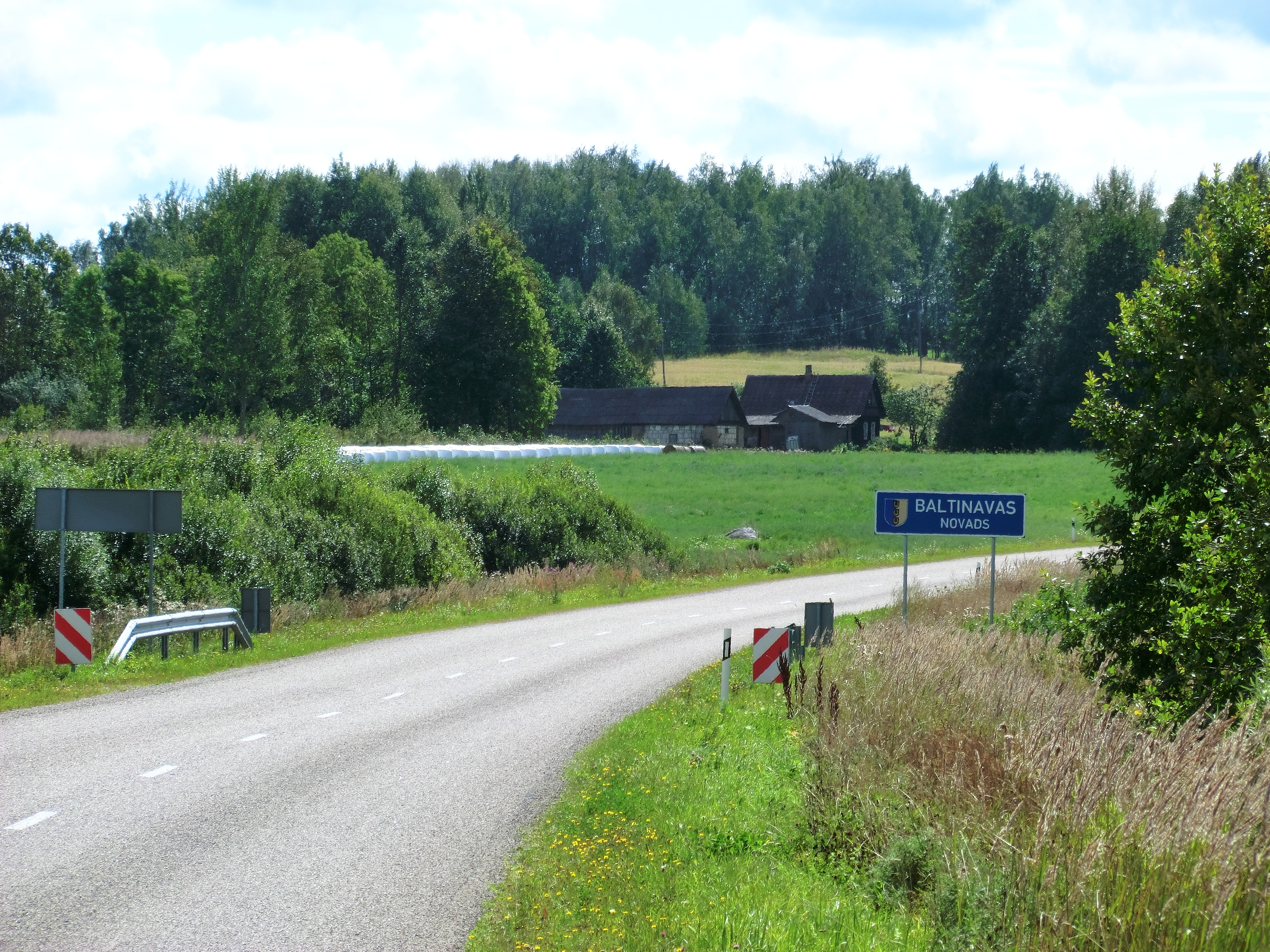
Border of the former Baltinava Municipality

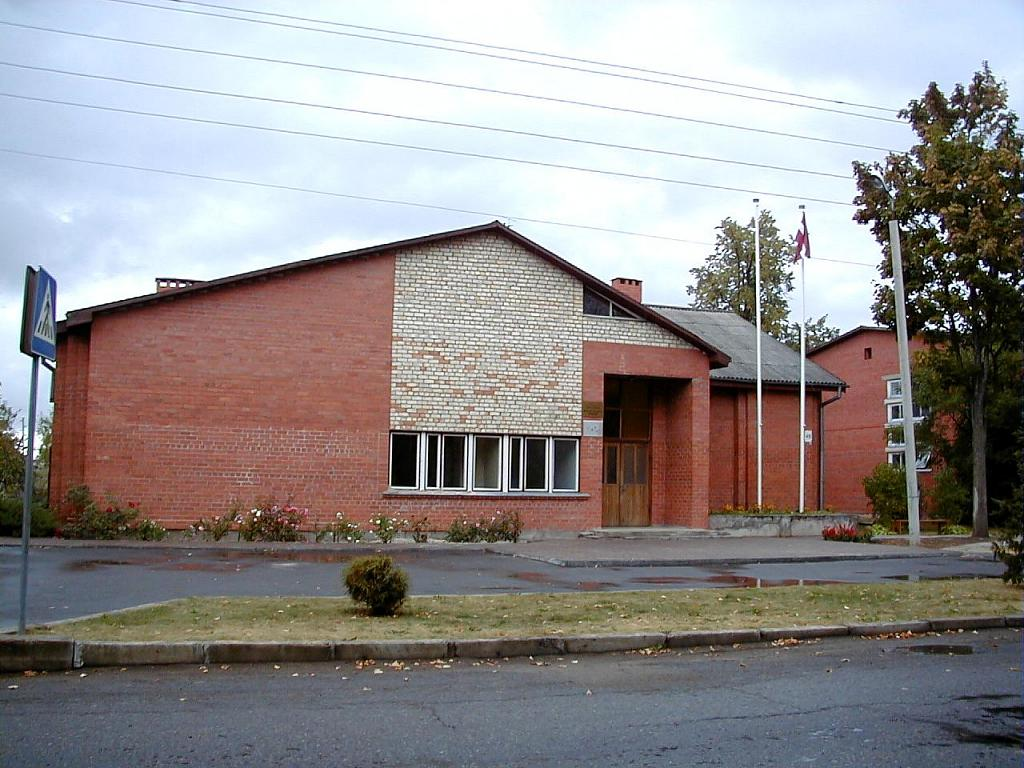
Rugāji Parish Council Building

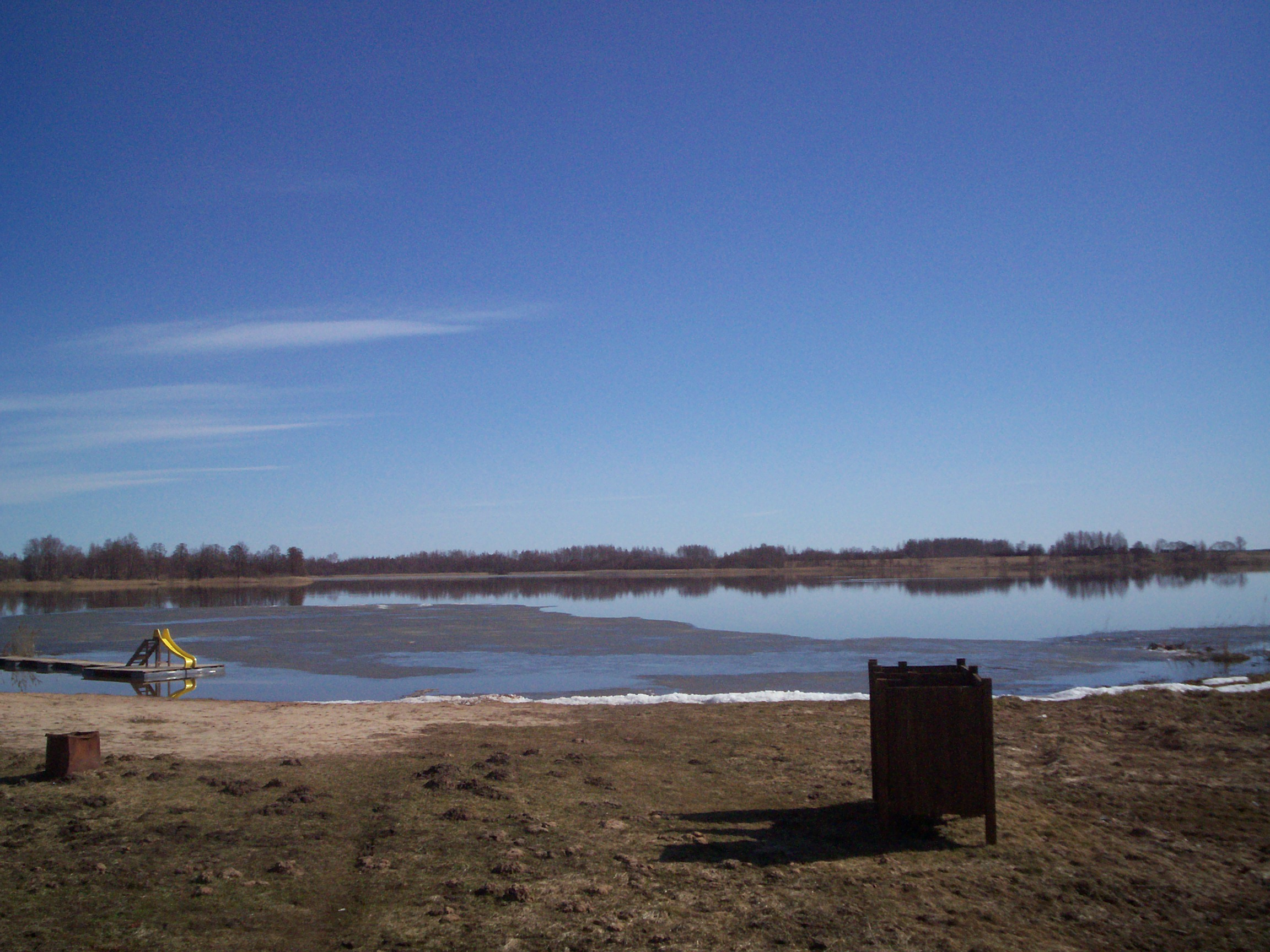
Viļaka Lake

== See also ==
- Administrative divisions of Latvia (2009)
- Balvi#Notable people
