= Viļķene Parish =

Parish of Latvia

- parish of Latvia
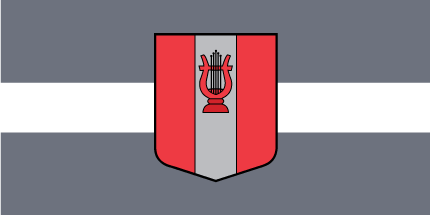
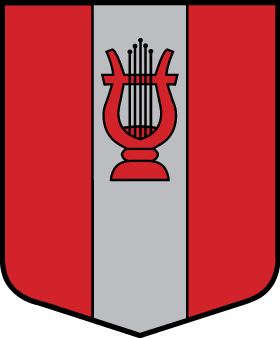
- Flag Coat of arms

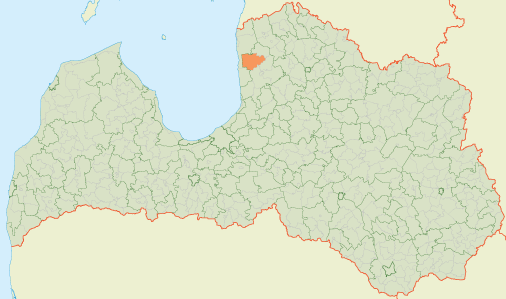
- Coordinates: 57°36′18″N 24°36′15″E
- Country: Latvia

Population (1 January 2026)
  - Total: 1,080

Viļķene Parish (Latvian: Viļķenes pagasts) is an administrative unit of Limbaži Municipality in the Vidzeme region of Latvia.

It borders with Pāle, Katvari, Limbaži, Liepupe and Salacgrīva parishes. The center of the parish is in Viļķene.

Area: 224.5 km²

Population: 1,253 (2011)

== Towns, villages and settlements of Viļķene Parish ==
- Viļķene - parish administrative center

== Notable residents ==
- Kārlis Baumanis (May 11, 1835 – January 10, 1905), composer of the Latvian national anthem, "Dievs, svētī Latviju!", was born in Viļķene.
