= Salacgrīva Municipality =

Municipality of Latvia

Coordinates: 57.7681°N 24.3631°E

Salacgrīva Municipality Salacgrīvas novads
- Municipality
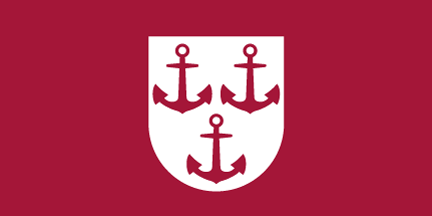
- Flag Coat of arms

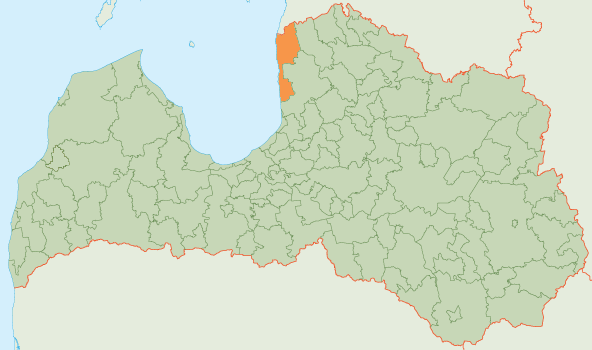
- Country: Latvia
- Formed: 2009
- Centre: Salacgrīva

Government
  - Council Chair: Dagnis Straubergs (LRA)

Area
  - Total: 638.24 km^{2} (246.43 sq mi)
  - Land: 626.91 km^{2} (242.05 sq mi)
  - Water: 11.33 km^{2} (4.37 sq mi)

Population (2021)
  - Total: 7,282
  - Density: 11.62/km^{2} (30.08/sq mi)
- Website: www.salacgriva.lv

Salacgrīva Municipality (Latvian: Salacgrīvas novads) is a former municipality of Latvia. It was created as a result of the territorial reform in 2009, which united several former parts of Limbaži region - Salacgrīva town with its rural areas, Ainaži town with its rural territory and Liepupe Parish. Salacgrīva municipality is bordered by Aloja and Limbaži municipalities and Estonian Pärnu circuit. The centre of the municipality was Salacgrīva. The population in 2020 was 7,152.

On 1 July 2021, Salacgrīva Municipality ceased to exist and its territory was merged into Limbaži Municipality.

== Nature ==
4 species of shellfish can be found in the coastal municipality of Salacgrīva: soft-shell clam (Mya arenaria), Baltic clam (Macoma Baltica), lagoon cockle (Cerastoderma glaucum), and the bay mussel (Mytilus trossulus). Aforetime locals used shellfish as a feed for chicken, as such diet provided stronger egg shells. Salacgrīva district is a part of the North Vidzeme Biosphere Reserve, and a nature reserve "Vidzemes akmeņainā jūrmala" (Rocky Seashore of Vidzeme) lies within the area of the municipality. The size of this nature reserve is 3370 ha and it takes up 12 km of the sea cost of Vidzeme. Very rare and protected habitats, which are not present elsewhere in Latvian, are abundant in this area. The beaches are covered with stones and pebbles, meadows, foredunes or white dunes. Between beaches and forests an unusual habitat - Grey dunes – is hidden. Sandstone outcrops can be seen on the sea shore. Typical as well as rare and protected species and habitats can be found on the Stony beach. The boulders, which are located on the underwater part of the water level, serve as "brakes" during strong winds and storms, protecting the shore and forelands from erosion. The sandstone which can be seen in the outcrops of "Vidzemes akmeņainajā jūrmalā" (rocky seashore of Vidzeme) has formed over 350 million years ago. The largest outcrop on Vidzeme coast is the Veczemju cliffs.

== History ==
An axe from the Stone Age has been found in the area of the current Salacgrīva rural area, suggesting very ancient settlements in this area. It is, however, clearly known that Salaca region has historically been inhabited by Livs. The Livonian chronicle of Henry mentions times when the area in Salacgrīva municipality was owned by Metsepole County, where, already in 1205, the priest Alobrand - a Catholic priest and one of the first missionaries in Livonia – established a church and took up a Christian preaching mission. Archaeological works by Juris Urtāns in 1973 confirmed that during the 14th century there had been ancient places of worship and sacrifice on the right bank of Svētupe River, near Kuiķuļi. The area hosts two ancient Liv sacrificial caves, whose rocks have been formed as a geological object during the middle Devonian period about 400 million years ago. The smaller cave is low and narrow, 46 m long, but the largest one – 19.5 m long and up to 2 metres high. On the walls of the cave ancient drawings, traditional Latvian signs have been discovered – such as Jumis, Lietuvēna cross and others. In the anteroom hall of the cave, 628 coins, 35 antiques, and organic stem donations were found. Already during the 13th century Salacgrīva became a centre for shipping and trade of Bishop Albert, since the geographical situation of Salacgrīva allowed the goods to be delivered both by water and by road, consequently developing the whole area. A necessity for a traffic network from Salacgrīva to Limbaži emerged. Due to development of trade, Salaca region became one of the most intense areas in traffic intensity in Latvia in the 14th century. In 1908 a ferroconcrete bridge over Salaca was built in Vecsalaca, which was opened a year later, on 13 June. At that time concrete was a new construction material, which was introduced here before other provinces of Russian empire due to German Construction Company “Wayss and Freytag A.G.”, which was very active in Latvia at that time. Annasmuiža Ferroconcrete Bridge is one of two bridges on gravel roads of Latvia that have been conserved fragmentarily from the beginning of the era of ferroconcrete. After the declaration of independence, the current area of Salacgrīva municipality was divided between parishes of Salaca and Svētciems. 2 primary schools operated in Salaca parish - Ausekļu 1.degree school and Korģenes 6 year school. Seven teachers worked in these schools, teaching 231 student. In 1937, there were 2520 inhabitants in Salaca parish, 129 old farms, 145 new farms and 66 small farms. At the same time, 1750 people lived in Svētciems parish; there were 56 old farms, 163 new farms and 27 small farms. One six-year school operated in the parish with 3 teachers who taught 86 students. In 1928 the Ministry of Agriculture created a horse farm in Svētciems, where Hannover horses were raised. In 1937 the description of agricultural lands was adverse, as two unfavourable types of soil predominated – sand and tough clay. The main income, however, was provided by agriculture. Locals provided for themselves also through fishing in the sea and river, cutting forests in winter and flooding trees in spring. After the establishment of Soviet rule, parishes were gradually eliminated, forming three villages instead of Salaca and Svētciems parishes – Zonepe, Korģene and Salaca village.

=== Administrative division ===
Salacgrīva district was divided into 5 territorial units: Ainaži town, Salacgrīva town, Salacgrīva, Ainaži and Liepupe parishes.

=== Populated areas ===
The largest populated areas in Salacgrīva district were as follows: Salacgrīva, Ainaži, Dunte, Dunte school, Mustkalni, Liepupe, Jelgavkrasti, Lembuži, Prinkas, Tūjasmuiža, Tūja, Mežciems, Ķumrags, Meleki, Vitrupe, Šķirstciems, Lāņi, Svētciems, Vecsalaca, Korģene, Kuiviži and Mērnieki.

=== Population dynamics ===
Judging of the data of citizenship and migration, on 1 January 2015, there were 8685 inhabitants in Salacgrīva municipality.

== Local government ==
The council of Salacgrīva municipality consists of 15 elected members: Dagnis Straubergs, Ilona Balode, Dace Martinsone, Skaidrīte Eglīte, Lija Jokste, Andris Zunde, Aija Kirhenšteina, Jānis Cīrulis, Māris Trankalis, Sanita Šlekona, Gints Šmits, Normunds Tiesnesis, Inga Čekaļina, Aleksandrs Rozenšteins who represent the political party Reģionu Alianse, and Alda Ansberga, who represents the political party Visu Latvijai-Tēvzemei un Brīvībai/LNNK.

== Education ==
On the 17th century a parish school was established in Jaunsalaca district. In the beginning, it had 7 students. Literacy spread rather quickly and already in 1788, there were 144 boys, and 102 girls, 125 men and 68 women, studying in Jaunsalaca parish school. In the 19th century this school developed even further, offering a 2-3 year course and accepting only parish school graduates, who were 14–16 years old. Education has a price, therefore the parents who wanted to have their children educated, had to pay 6-7 roubles a year for the school. This meant that only the richest landlords and they children had the chance to get education. By the end of the 20th century there were xxx students and a teacher received a salary of 504 roubles a month.

In the middle of the 19th century, a massive switch to orthodoxy was characteristic in the poor seashore areas, as the Russian Tsar had promised to grant lands to people who would accept orthodoxy. In relation to this, in 1805 an orthodox parish school was opened in Salacgrīva, while special schools with a single teacher working there, were established in Vecsalaca and Svētciems. Currently there are secondary schools in Salacgrīva and Liepupe and primary schools in Ainaži and Korģene.

== Sports ==
The municipality of Salacgrīva and municipality of Limbaži have jointly established a sports school - Limbaži and Salacgrīva municipality Sports school.

Most popular sport in Salacgrīva is basketball. Basketball club Salacgrīva is the main organization that develops basketball. The Senior team is BK Salacgrīva that is participating in Latvian basketball league third division. The club consists of four teams - BK Salacgrīva, Grīva, Kopturis-A, Salacgrīvas vidusskola.

Main organized events are "Beach streetball" in Salacgrīva seashore, "Salacgrīvas Krastu mačs" where the river Salaca divides teams in two - one team represents the left side of the municipality, the other the right side.

Basketball klub Salacgrīva is the champions of Latvian basketball league third division in 2014

== Culture ==
Ainaži culture house. The cultural association of Ainaži was established in 1926, with a dance group and a choir that were active at that time. The culture house was built in 1928, with 2 men - Jānis Asars and Remberts Rungainis donating large funds for its construction. The culture house has been built after the project of P. Kundziņš and it has been granted the status of Cultural Heritage of Europe since 1966. Since the construction of this building, it has been exclusively used only as a culture house. Independence Day, as well as other holidays and events are regularly celebrated here. Currently 6 interest groups of folklore and art are based here: mixed choir Krasts, youth dance collective Randiņš, adult and student amateur theatre, children folk dance collective Zvirgzdiņi and Jūrmalnieks.

Liepupe parish culture house. The building for the culture house was constructed in 1907 for the interest of the parish administration and culture house.

- Mixed choir Pernigele is one of the oldest choirs in Latvia – it was established in 1904 as the choir of association of singing of Liepupe. It takes a very active part in the local culture life, performs in many events and many churches of Latvia. Since 1926, the choir has been taking part in The general Latvian Song and Dance Festival. In recent years it has participated in several festivals and competitions abroad.
- With goal to popularize theatre art and promote to general public, the amateur theatre was established on 1 December 2006. The participants of this collective are very active and talented.
- Medium generation dance collective Ulubelle
- Youth dance collective „Liepupīte”
- Men ensemble – it was established in 2007. Musically very gifted men from Dunte, Liepupe, Tūja and Salacgrīva take part in this phonic vocal instrumental ensemble.
- Ethnic tradition collective „Skale”, which was established in 2010 with an aim to introduce today's youth with our traditional folk and cultural heritage. They organize traditional events annually.
- Valdis Andersons folk band. Valdis Andersons, who is an inhabitant of Tūja, started this chapel after gathering a lovely collection of ancient musical instruments and hand harmonica. This is a place that welcomes every person that is keen on playing ancient musical instruments.
- Lauvu culture house - the culture house in Lauvas operates in the largest building in the whole village. The society “Svētupes Lauva” also are based here. Cultural events, concerts and gatherings take place here.

== Tourism ==
Tourist information about Salacgrīva municipality can be found in Salacgrīva tourist information centre in Salacgrīva, Rīgas str.10a and Ainaži tourist information point in Ainaži, Valdemāra str.50a as well as online –

== Local events ==
- In May, two events of the importance of cultural history take place in Salacgrīva municipality: The Museum Night and Raftsmen Festival, where each person can learn the skills of raft binding using raftsmen tools.
- June is the time for Acoustic Music Festival. Its main idea is to popularize acoustic music traditions. During the festival there are ancient musical instrument workshops and seminars.
- On the second Saturday of July, the traditional Sea Festival takes place in Salacgrīva.
- Classical Music Festival takes place in Salacgrīva municipality at the end of July, organizing many high quality classical music concerts.
- In August, the North Livonian Festival is celebrated in Ainaži. All day and night, various activities take place – craftsmen market, concerts, creative workshops and sports competitions with it all resulting in a wonderful open-air ball.

== Religion ==
Sv. Arsenius’s orthodox church - 1889, in an orthodox church was established in Ainaži. The number of Russian-speakers was very little, therefore the Russian tsar promised land to people who would accept orthodox Christianity. As a result, in 1894-1895 the congregation was wealthy enough to be able to build a church. During the Second World War the German troops removed the bell of the Orthodox Church in order to melt it into s-curve cannon. During the Soviet rule the activities of the church had ceased, and it returned only in 1995. Evangelical Lutheran church of Liepupe Church - the church was built in 1784, but it turned into ashes in 1970. It was restored in 1995 and it has a very unconventional design and layout: the altar is located in the middle, with the pulpit located above the altar.

== Famous people of Salacgrīva municipality ==
- Jānis Kalniņš - born in 1867 in „Jesperu” home. He was a general in Sloka and Babīte marshes and the Death island, where he ran the 3rd battalion of Kurzeme. He has been rewarded with Lāčplēša order.
- Anete Kociņa – Silver medallist in the European Junior Championship 2015.
- Anita Emse - a poet; one of the last people who speak the Vidzeme liv dialect.
- Agra Jēgere – a senior woman who has received the award of “The Pride of Latvia” in 2012 in the nomination „Aid for fellow human beings”. Her hand-made woollen stockings reach poor families and old people all around Latvia.

== See also ==
- Administrative divisions of Latvia
