= Limbaži Airfield =

General aviation airfield in Latvia

Limbaži Airfield Limbažu lidlauks
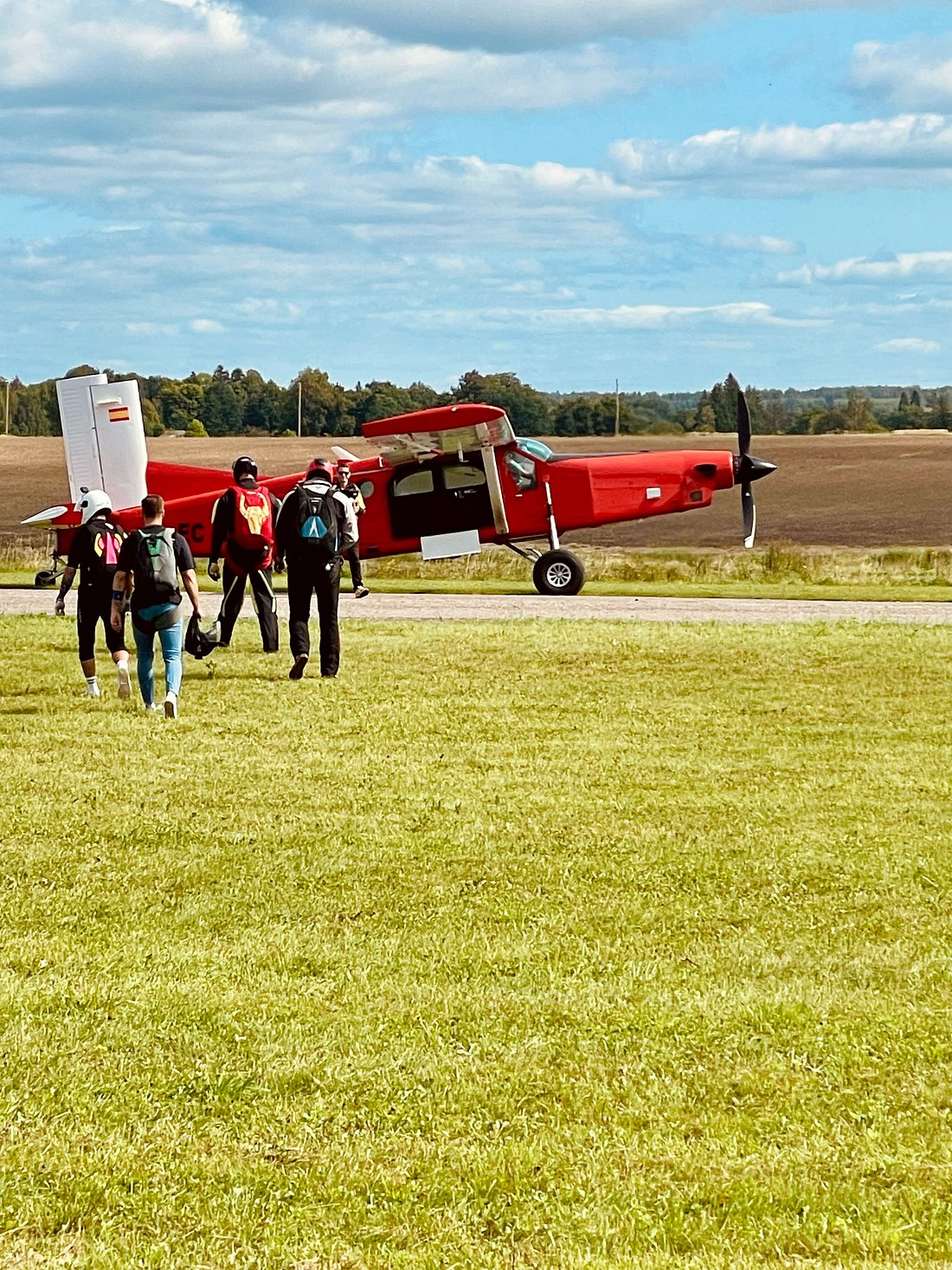
- A Pilatus PC-6 at Limbaži Airfield
- IATA: none; ICAO: EVLI

Summary
- Operator: SIA "Vidrižu Atvari"
- Serves: Limbaži
- Location: Limbaži Parish, Limbaži Municipality, Latvia
- Elevation AMSL: 211 ft (64 m)
- Coordinates: 57°29′06″N 24°40′20″E

Map
- Interactive map of Limbaži Airfield

Runways
Direction	Length		Surface
Direction	m	ft	Surface
16/34	760	2,493	Grass
- Current classification: Latvian AIP and Civil Aviation Agency. Detailed aerodrome data: 2021 AIP edition.

Limbaži Airfield (Latvian: Limbažu lidlauks; ICAO airport code: EVLI), historically also known as Langači Airfield, is a general aviation airfield in Limbaži Parish, Limbaži Municipality, Latvia. It is located 2.2 nautical miles (4.1 kilometres) south-west of Limbaži. The current Latvian AIP index classifies EVLI as a national aerodrome for visual flight rules general aviation, and the Latvian Civil Aviation Agency lists it among the country's general aviation aerodromes.

== History ==
A 1995 Latvian government order listed Langači among the airfields retained in state ownership under the Ministry of Defence. On 9 January 2002, the government authorised the Ministry of Defence to transfer the Langači airfield property without compensation to Limbaži Parish municipality. A companion order removed Langači from the list of aerodromes covered by the 1992 protection and status decision.

The municipal profile of Limbaži Parish describes the site as a former agricultural airfield redeveloped by aviation enthusiast Gunārs Līcītis around the beginning of the 2000s. It states that the airfield was certified in 2006 and appeared on European aviation charts from 2009. In October 2001, the regional newspaper Auseklis reported that Līcītis landed at the airfield after completing a solo flight from Chicago to Limbaži across the Atlantic Ocean.

A 2009 report in Auseklis described continuing redevelopment at Langači, including two new buildings, and identified the airfield as a unit of the parquet manufacturer SIA "Vidrižu Atvari".

== Facilities and operations ==
The 2021 AIP edition listed the airfield elevation as 211 feet (64 m), and its grass runway 16/34 as 760 metres (2,493 ft) long and 30 metres (98 ft) wide, with a maximum permitted aircraft take-off mass of 5.7 tonnes. The same edition listed a 142 metres (466 ft) by 35 metres (115 ft) asphalt apron, a 9 metres (30 ft)-wide asphalt taxiway, daytime VFR operations and hangar space for visiting aircraft.

The airfield hosted the inaugural Fly In Limbaži aviation event in August 2020. A municipal report described the 2022 event as the third edition and stated that the programme opened with parachutists from Skydive Latvia. The 2023 event included aircraft and helicopter demonstrations and aerobatic flying, and received coverage from Latvian television news and Xinhua News Agency.

== 2024 aircraft accident ==
On 19 June 2024, a Pilatus PC-6/B2-H4 registered YL-YEA was operating parachuting flights from Limbaži when worsening weather prevented a landing after two attempts. The pilot diverted towards Riga International Airport, but the aircraft made an emergency landing about 3 miles (5 km) from the airport. The aircraft sustained substantial damage to its forward fuselage; the pilot was uninjured and the passenger, a parachutist, sustained moderate injuries.
