= Aloja =

Aloja may refer to:

- Aloja, Latvia, a town in Latvia
  - Aloja Parish
  - Aloja Municipality
- Aloja (mythology), mythical creatures in Catalan legends
