= Auseklis (disambiguation) =

Auseklis was a pre-Christian Latvian god. A Latvian national symbol dedicated to the deity is also called an auseklis or auseklītis.

Auseklis may also refer to:

- Auseklis Baušķenieks (1910–2007), Latvian painter
- Auseklis Ozols (1941–2025), Latvian-born American painter and fine arts educator
- A pen name for Latvian poet and author Miķelis Krogzemis (1850–1879)
- Auseklis Limbaži Theatre, an amateur theatre in Limbaži, Latvia
