= Aloja Municipality =

Former municipality of Latvia

Aloja Municipality Alojas novads
- Former municipality
- Coat of arms

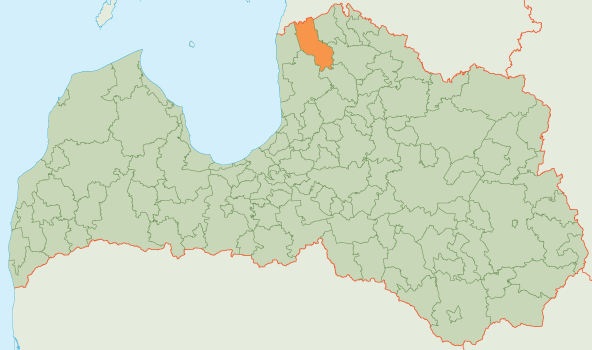
- Coordinates: 57°46′56″N 24°49′48″E
- Country: Latvia
- Formed: 2009
- Dissolved: 2021
- Centre: Aloja, Latvia

Government
  - Council Chairman (last): Valdis Bārda (LZS)

Area
  - Total: 631.41 km^{2} (243.79 sq mi)
  - Land: 618.89 km^{2} (238.95 sq mi)
  - Water: 12.52 km^{2} (4.83 sq mi)

Population (2021)
  - Total: 4,520
  - Density: 7.30/km^{2} (18.9/sq mi)
- Website: www.aloja.lv

Aloja Municipality (Latvian: Alojas novads) was a municipality in Latvia. The administrative center was Aloja.

The municipality was formed in 2009 by merging the former subdivisions of Limbaži district: Aloja town with its countryside (rural) territory, Staicele town with its countryside territory, Braslava Parish and Brīvzemnieki Parish. In 2010 Aloja Parish was created from the countryside territory of Aloja town and Staicele Parish was created from the countryside territory of Staicele town.

On 1 July 2021, Aloja Municipality ceased to exist and its territory was merged into Limbaži Municipality.

Aloja Municipality was located in the territory of the North Vidzeme Biosphere Reserve and previously had a rich Liv (Livonian) cultural heritage area, centered around the Salaca area. Aloja and Staicele were two of the towns of the municipality that featured historical buildings of the end of the 19th century and the beginning of the 20th century, especially wooden architecture.

== See also ==
- Administrative divisions of Latvia
