= First Latvian National Awakening =

Cultural and national revival movement between 1850 and 1880

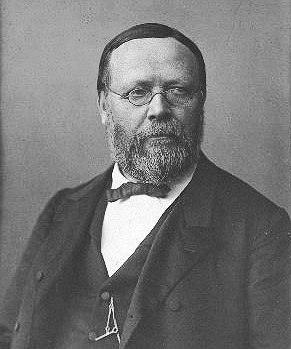
Krišjānis Valdemārs

Dievs, svētī Latviju!, the national anthem of Latvia

The First Latvian National Awakening or the First Awakening (Latvian: Pirmā atmoda) was a cultural and national revival movement between 1850 and 1880 among the Young Latvians, a group of well-educated Latvians, who, opposed to the Baltic German dominance in Livonia and Courland Governorates, created the basis for the modern Latvian nation state. It was influenced by the European romantic nationalism movements of Young Germans and Czech National Revival. Most of their efforts were spent on educating Latvians, criticizing Germans and removing the stigma from Latvian language, traditions and culture.

The movement started after 1850 in the University of Tartu, which then was the highest place of education in Livonian Governorate and was attended by around 30 ethnic Latvian students. Krišjānis Valdemārs, a student from Courland, posted in his dorm room a note identifying himself as a Latvian, which was unheard of at the time. Very soon a group of 10-13 students grew around him; they organized “Latvian evenings”, during which they debated about the condition of German-oppressed Latvians. Juris Alunāns and Krišjānis Barons soon became leading members.

They established the newspapers Mājas Viesis and Pēterburgas Avīzes. The movement initially was supported by Russian authorities, who saw it as a tool against the German-dominated Baltic provinces.

In 1868, Young Latvian Fricis Brīvzemnieks began gathering Latvian folk songs known as dainas. His work was continued by Krišjānis Barons, who in 1894 published the first book of dainas and eventually become known as the Father of Dainas (Dainutēvs).

Another literary activist was teacher Atis Kronvalds, who discovered mention of a red-white-red flag in the 13th-century Livonian Rhymed Chronicle. These colors eventually became the flag of Latvia. Kronvalds worked tirelessly on promoting education among Latvians, and modernized the Latvian language by creating many new words.

In 1868, initially, as a charity organization for helping victims of Estonian crop failure, the Riga Latvian Society was established, which organized Latvian cultural life in Riga and regions. The first Latvian theatre troupe led by Ādolfs Alunāns was established here, which led to the birth of playwriting in Latvian.

In 1873, the first Latvian singing festival was held in Riga, during which most of the songs were Latvian folk songs. Of the new songs performed there, one of them, composed by Baumaņu Kārlis, later became the national anthem of Latvia. Fearing the growth of nationalism, its original name of “God, bless Latvia!” was changed by Russian censors to “God, bless the Baltics!”.

In 1888, the national epic Lāčplēsis, written by Andrejs Pumpurs, was first published.

The First Awakening was a cultural movement mostly among the well-educated classes and soon ran out of momentum as Latvian society became more mature and interested in new political and scientific ideas. Many of the leading Young Latvians died early or worked in Russia, away from their home. Latvians also experienced a wave of Russianization during which use of Latvian in schools was prohibited.

The First Awakening was followed by the New Current (Jaunā strāva) movement, which was much more political and led to the establishment of the Social Democratic Party.

The First Awakening's interest in folklore was carried on by the Baltic neopagan movement Dievturība, which was created in the 1920s by Ernests Brastiņš and Kārlis Marovskis-Bregžis.

== See also ==
- Latvian national awakening
- History of Latvia
