= Adam Bruno Wikszemski =

Polish anatomist

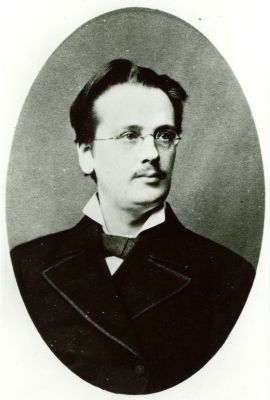
- Born: 18 October 1847; Nyasvizh
- Died: 10 February 1890 (aged 42); Berlin
- Education: University of Dorpat
- Known for: Pioneer of phonographic recording
- Scientific career
- Fields: Anatomy, medicine
- Workplaces: University of Dorpat

Signature
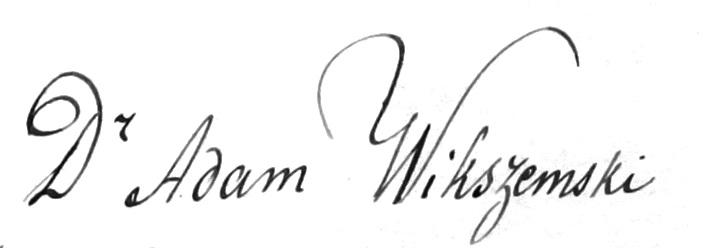

Adam Bruno Wikszemski (18 October 1847 – 10 February 1890) was a Polish physician, anatomist, and pioneer of phonographic recording.

== Biography ==
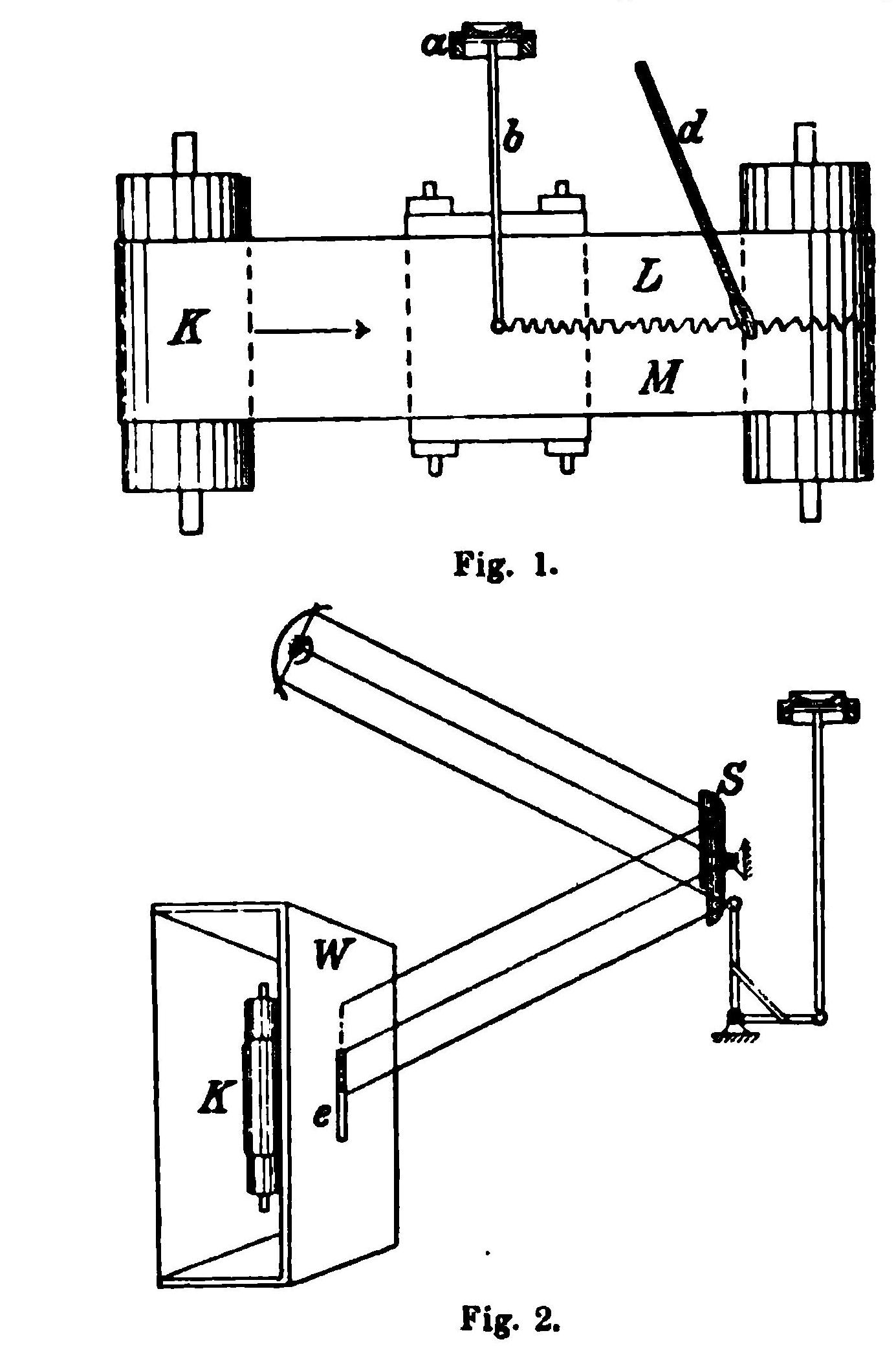
Diagram showing Wikszemski's phonograph

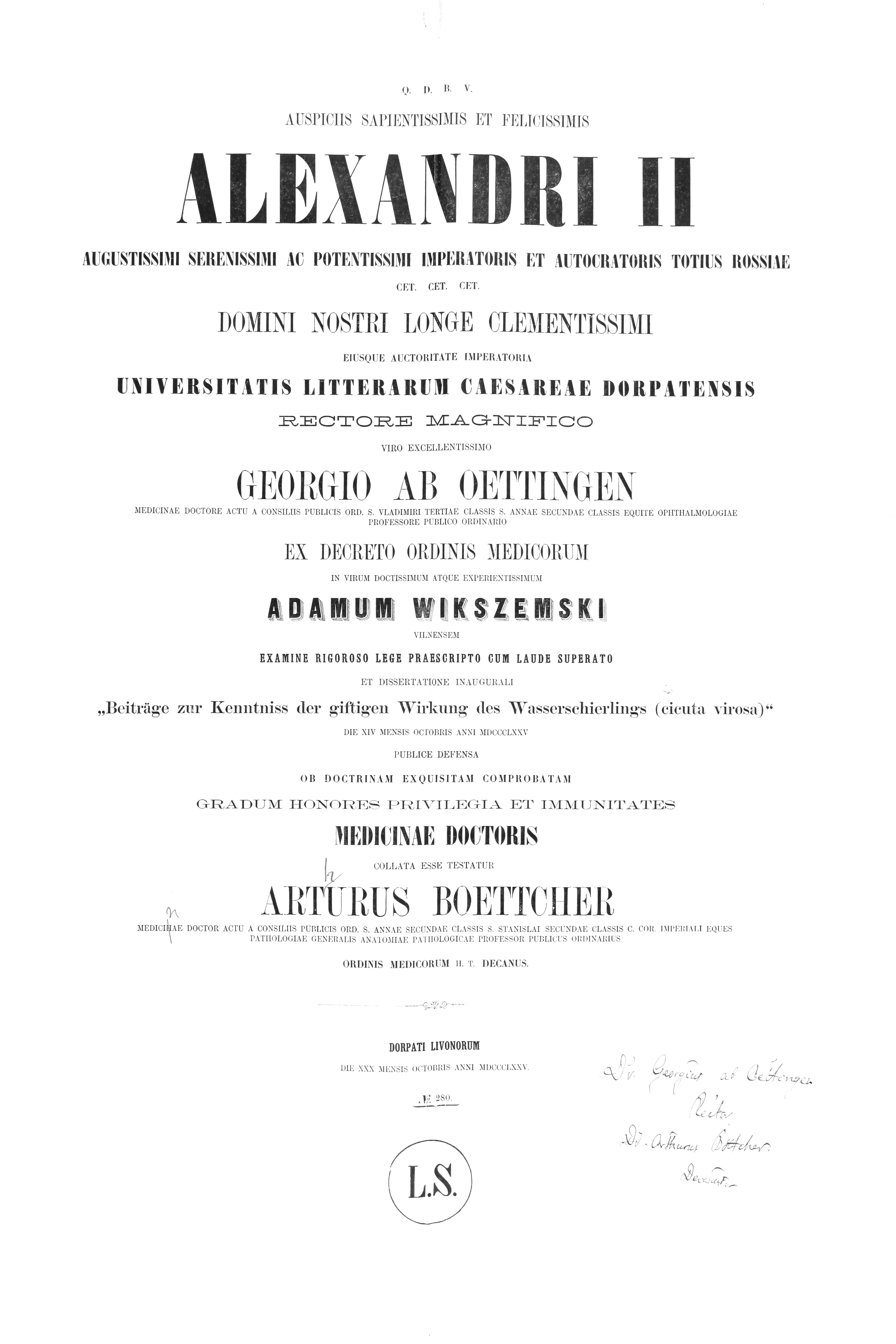
Wikszemski's university diploma

He was the son of Franciszek (d. 1883 in Dorpat) and nephew of Stanisław (1807–1875), physicians from Vilnius. The noble Wikszemski family used the Jelita coat of arms. Adam's grandfather, Gabriel, owned an estate in Baranivka in the Zhytomyr district.

Adam Wikszemski graduated from gymnasium in Vitebsk in 1865 (according to other sources in Vilnius) and began his studies at the University of Dorpat, first in the chemistry department, then in the medical department. During his studies he was a member of Konwent Polonia. He obtained his doctorate in medical sciences in 1875 based on a dissertation on the properties of cowbane. He subsequently became a supernumerary prosector at the Anatomical Institute and assistant to Ludwig Stieda. He was as prosector from 1887 to 1889. After Stieda's departure from Dorpat to Königsberg, he taught anatomy until the chair was taken over by August Rauber. During the Russo-Turkish War, he ran the surgical clinic on behalf of Ernst von Bergmann, and simultaneously maintained his own medical practice. He held the rank of Collegiate Councillor. He was a member of the Estonian Naturalists' Society. Due to university policy, forced by the Tsarist authorities, he did not receive a docentship, despite the patronage of Professor Stieda. Benedykt Dybowski wrote about this in his memoirs:

As for Dorpat itself, Professors Bidder, Flor and Schwarz informed me when I visited them in Dorpat that the university would not nominate any Pole for a tenured docentship, as a confidential notification had arrived from the ministry that no such nomination would be approved. For example, Professor Stieda had nominated his assistant Dr. Wikszemski for a tenured prosector position and anatomy docent, but the medical faculty did not approve this nomination, unwilling to go against the wishes of the ministry of education.

On 6 November 1889, Wikszemski patented an invention in the Berlin patent office for a "device for phonographic recording of sound vibrations". The device consisted of a rotating cylinder winding photographic paper, and a system of mirrors reflecting light rays onto the surface of the housing in which the cylinder was enclosed. One of the mirrors was connected to a membrane that vibrated under the influence of sound waves, which could be registered on the photographic paper in the form of a graph. The invention was recognized as pioneering in the work of Parfentiev, and an article was devoted to it in the Phonographic Review. According to the authors of these works, the device designed by Wikszemski enabled one-sided lateral sound recording, for which reading however required the invention of the phototube.

Mykola Vasylenko wrote about the "pale, sickly" Polish docent Wikszemski in his memoirs. On 21 November 1889, Wikszemski submitted his resignation, writing that he was suffering from pyelonephritis and required surgery. He died three months later in Berlin, where he had gone for treatment. The funeral was organized by Professor Bergmann. His death was announced by the St. Petersburg newspaper Kraj and the medical press: Gazeta Lekarska, Medycyna, and Przegląd Lekarski.

== Works ==
- Beiträge zur Kenntniss der giftigen Wirkung des Wasserschierlings [Contributions to the Knowledge of the Toxic Effect of Water Hemlock] (in German). Dorpat: C. Mattiesen. 1875. pp. 1–58.
- "Eine Modification der von Pansch empfohlenen kalten Injection mit Kleistermasse" [A Modification of the Cold Injection with Paste Mass Recommended by Pansch]. Archiv für Anatomie und Entwickelungsgeschichte (in German). 6: 232–234. 1880.
- "Verfahren zur Herstellung der Phonogrammen. Erben des verstorbenen Dr. A. Wikszemski in Dorpat, Rusland. Nr. 53641 vom 6. November 1889. Kl. 42" [Process for the Production of Phonograms. Heirs of the Late Dr. A. Wikszemski in Dorpat, Russia. No. 53641 of 6 November 1889. Class 42]. Zeitschrift für Instrumentenkunde (in German). 11 (1): 110. 1891.
- "Verfahren zur Wiedergabe von Lauten oder Tönen mittels bandförmiger Phonogramme. Erben des Dr. A. Wikszemski in Dorpat. Nr. 53944 vom 6. November 1889. Kl. 42" [Process for the Reproduction of Sounds or Tones by Means of Band-Shaped Phonograms. Heirs of Dr. A. Wikszemski in Dorpat. No. 53944 of 6 November 1889. Class 42]. Zeitschrift für Instrumentenkunde (in German). 11 (1): 110. 1891.
