= Auseklis Limbaži Theatre =

Amateur theatre in Limbaži, Latvia

- Formation: 1884
- Type: Theatre group
- Purpose: Amateur theatre
- Location: Limbaži, Latvia
- Website: avatarrepertorytheater.org/home

Auseklis Limbaži Theatre (Latvian: Ausekļa Limbažu teātris), founded in 1884, is one of the oldest amateur theatres in Latvia. It is based in the city of Limbaži and is named after the pen name of Latvian poet Miķelis Krogzemis.

In 1884 under the wing of the Community Club a troupe came together and on December 16, 1884, performed two short plays. But already in the summer of 1887 they did Ādolfs Alunāns' John Neiland. At that time the Theatre would stage two or three plays each year, they did open-air shows, theatrical parades with approximately a hundred participants. Theatre shows were a significant event in the town and the nearest parishes. The Theatre had such professional directors as Kristaps Linde, Vilis Abrams, Augusts Gulbis.

During the time prior to World War II the directors were focusing mostly on Latvian drama, they staged about four large scale productions every year. They toured around the neighbouring parishes. The theatre would go to do their shows if the organisers covered the travel and few other basic costs, therefore some communities gained a good profit. With their large supply of costumes and stage props the Theatre would also support schools and other community organisations. The troupe was aided by the Culture Fund with their annual grants, Limbazi municipality had liberated the Theatre from the Entertainment Tax.

Until 1982 the theatre was led by director Dailonis Vanags who had become a professional in his own ensemble. At that time the Theatre's scenographer was Uldis Pauzers and costume designer—Larisa Brauna. Since 1984—after graduating Schukin's Institute in Moscow, Inta Kalnina took to the management of Auseklis Limbazi Theatre. With the lapse of time there has grown strong ensemble capable of playing any classics or contemporary drama no matter whether on small indoor or large open-air stages.

The theatre participates in many festivals and contests and nowadays is one of the most renowned amateur groups in Latvia. Starting with 1997, Auseklis Limbazi Theatre has been participating in international festivals. Production of Friedrich Dürrenmatt's Play Strindberg went to Belgium, Estonia and Lithuania, Sławomir Mrożek's At Sea travelled to Denmark, Iceland and Lithuania, Inga Abele's Dzelzzāle (Iron Weed) had its premiere in Copenhagen, Denmark.

Theatre takes part in all the major events of Limbaži town and biannually holds the International Contemporary Drama Festival Spēlesprieks where churches, abandoned factories, cellars, town squares, castle ruins and other extraordinary locations are used as stages.
