= Miķelis Krogzemis =

Latvian poet

Auseklis
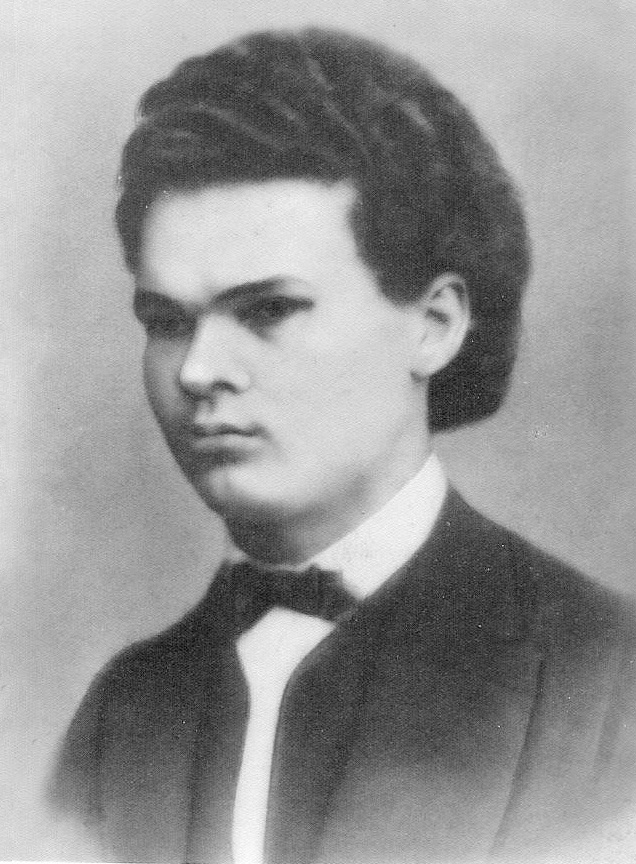
- Born: 18 September 1850; Ungurpils Parish, Kreis Wolmar, Governorate of Livonia, Russian Empire (Now Limbaži Municipality Latvia)
- Died: 6 February 1879 (aged 28); St. Petersburg, Russian Empire (Now Russia)
- Occupations: Poet, Teacher
- Movement: Young Latvians

Miķelis Krogzemis (18 September 1850, Ungurpils – 6 February 1879, Saint Petersburg, Russia), better known by his pen name Auseklis was a Latvian poet who wrote in Latvian and prominent member of the Young Latvians movement.

== Biography ==
Miķelis Krogzemis was born in Sīpoli, Ungurpils to a peasant family. He attended parochial school in Aloja and later in Ērgļi. In Ērgļi, he met members of the Jurjāni family, who got him in touch with the Young Latvian movement. In 1868, he was admitted to the teachers' seminary in Valka under the leadership of Latvian composer Jānis Cimze. While in Valka, he studied European literature and philosophy of the Age of Enlightenment.

After graduating in 1871, Krogzemis begin his teaching career in Jaunpiebalga, but was soon forced to leave the school due to conflicts with the local pastor. He then taught briefly in Cēsis before moving to Lielvārde to teach. In Lielvārde, he became active in the local cultural life. He organised theater and choir, and in 1873, participated in the first Latvian song festival in Riga. However, due to these activities and his anticlerical poetry, he soon found himself in conflict with the local pastor and was forced to leave.

Krogzemis moved to Vecpiebalga where he lived and worked with Atis Kronvalds, but their collaboration proved unsuccessful. He subsequently moved to Riga to seek employment. In 1874, he left for St. Petersburg where he taught in several schools and wrote literature. In St. Petersburg, he became close friends with Latvian composer Baumaņu Kārlis and contributed to the satirical magazine Dunduri.

In 1879, Krogzemis became ill with typhus and died on February 6. His funeral ceremony in Aloja attracted national attention.

== Literature ==
Miķelis Krogzemis is better known by his pen name Auseklis. His first publication was in the newspaper Baltijas Vēstnesis in 1872. In his poetry, he richly used motives of folklore and became one of the leading voices of the First Latvian National Awakening in poetry. In his satirical poems, he stood against Baltic German landowners, germanisation and obscurantism.
