= Maija Einfelde =

Latvian composer (born 1939)

Maija Einfelde (born 2 January 1939) is a Latvian composer.

== Biography ==
Maija Einfelde was born in Valmiera, Latvia, and began her music studies with her mother, who was a church organist. She continued her education at Alfrēds Kalniņš Music School in Cēsis, at Jāzeps Mediņš Music College in Riga, and then entered the Conservatoire of Latvia in 1966, studying composition with Jānis Ivanovs. After graduating, she has taught music theory and composition at Alfrēds Kalniņš Music School in Cēsis, Emīls Dārziņš Music College and Jāzeps Mediņš Music College. She has one son, writer Jānis Einfelds.

Einfelde's works have been performed internationally, including performances by the MDR Rundfunkchor at the Berliner Philharmonie, Brigham Young University Choir, the Vancouver Chamber Choir, the Kansas City Chorale in USA, the Radio Choir of the Netherlands, and at Carnegie Hall, New York City.

== Honors and awards ==
- First Prize, Barlow Endowment for Music Competition, 1997
- Grand Music Prize of Latvia, 1997
- Award of the Ministry of Culture of the Republic of Latvia, 1999

== Works ==
Einfelde composes mainly choral, organ and chamber music. Selected works include:

- 1982 Sonāte meditācija (Sonata-Meditation) for viola and piano
- 1985 Second Sonata for violin and piano
- 1989 Crucifixus for solo organ
- 1990 Lullaby, for women's choir
- 1993 String Quartet for two violin, viola and violoncello
- 1994 Ave Maria for organ
- 1994 Adagio for violin, cello, and piano
- 1994 Pirms saules rieta (Before the Sunset) for clarinet, viola and piano
- 1995 Ave Maria for woman's choir and organ
- 1996 Pie zemes tālās... (At the Edge of the Earth...), chamber oratorio for mixed choir
- 1998 Ave Maria for mixed choir and organ
- 1998 Psalm 15 for mixed choir
- 1999 Sanctus for solo organ
- 1999 Prelūdija (Prelude) for oboe and viola
- 2000 Skerco (Scherzo) for solo violoncello
- 2002 Noktirne (Nocturne) for harp
- 2003 Cikls ar Friča Bārdas dzeju (Three Poems by Fricis Bārda) for mixed choir
- 2006 Divas mīlas dziemsas (Two Love Songs) 12 voices
- 2002 Symphony

Her compositions have been recorded and issued on CD including:

- No Tevis (From You) // Female Choir Dzintars – 1995, Riga Recording Studio
- Ave Maria // Female Choir Dzintars – [1996/97]
- Trīs jūras dziesmas (Three Songs of the Sea) for oboe, French horn, and string orchestra // Rīgas kamermūziķi [Compilation of 20th Century Latvian music] – 1998, BRIZE
- Gloria for piccolo trumpet and organ / mit Edwart H. Tarr, Irmtraud Krüger, 1998, KREUZ PLUS: MUSIK, BEST. NR. 1627
- Pie zemes tālās... (At the Edge of the Earth…) / Latvian Radio Chamber Singers, Conductor Kaspars Putniņš – [Author CD] – 1999
- 15th Psalm / Latvian Radio Choir, Conductor Sigvards Kļava – 8'49" / Latviešu mūzika Rīgā – 1999
- Maija balāde (May Ballad) // Latvian Millennium Classics – 2000, UPE CLASSICS
- Noktirne (Nocturne) / Divejāda saule tek. Latvian New Music – 2003, LR CD 043
- Monologs (Monologue) for cello and piano // Spēlē Māris Villerušs CD 1 – 2003
- Dramatiskais dialogs // Negaidīta atklāsme (Unexpected Inspiration) – 2003, Riga Recording Company
- Sirēnu sala (The Isle of the Sirens) / Vocal ensemble Putni, artistic leader Antra Dreģe // Vokālais ansamblis Putni. Pamošanās – 2003, PUTNI
- Sonata for Violin and Organ / Jānis Bulavs and Larisa Bulava // Latvian New Music. Latviešu jaunā mūzika – 2004, Jānis Bulavs [recorded in Canada] // Saules lēkts – 2005, LMIC& Latvian Radio Choir, LMIC CD-2005-3
- Ave Maria // Latvian String Quartets. Latviešu stīgu kvarteti – 2008
