= Braslava Parish =

Parish of Latvia

- parish of Latvia
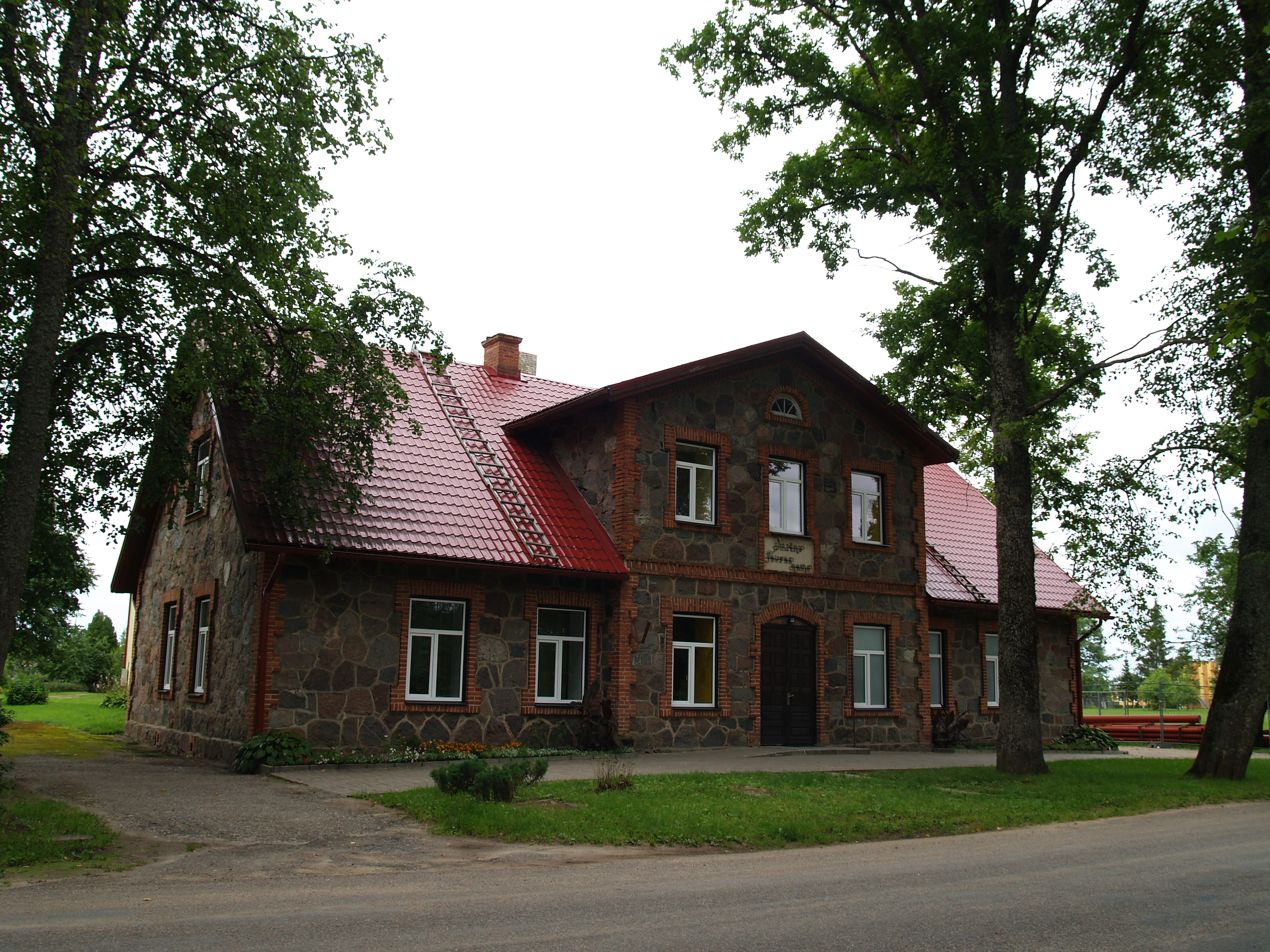

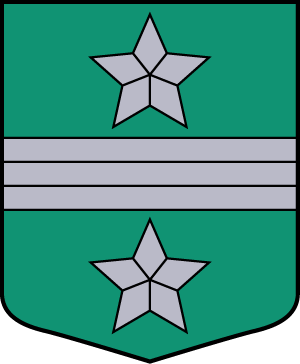
- Coat of arms

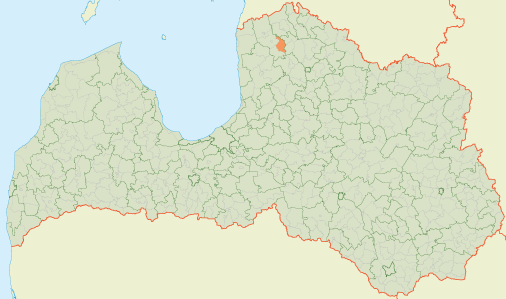
- 57°44′21″N 25°01′08″E
- Country: Latvia

Area
  - Total: 82.69 km^{2} (31.93 sq mi)
  - Land: 81.28 km^{2} (31.38 sq mi)
  - Water: 1.41 km^{2} (0.54 sq mi)

Population (1 January 2026)
  - Total: 531
  - Density: 6.53/km^{2} (16.9/sq mi)

Braslava Parish (Latvian: Braslavas pagasts) is an administrative unit of Limbaži Municipality, Latvia. It was an administrative unit of Limbaži district. The administrative center is Vilzēni village.

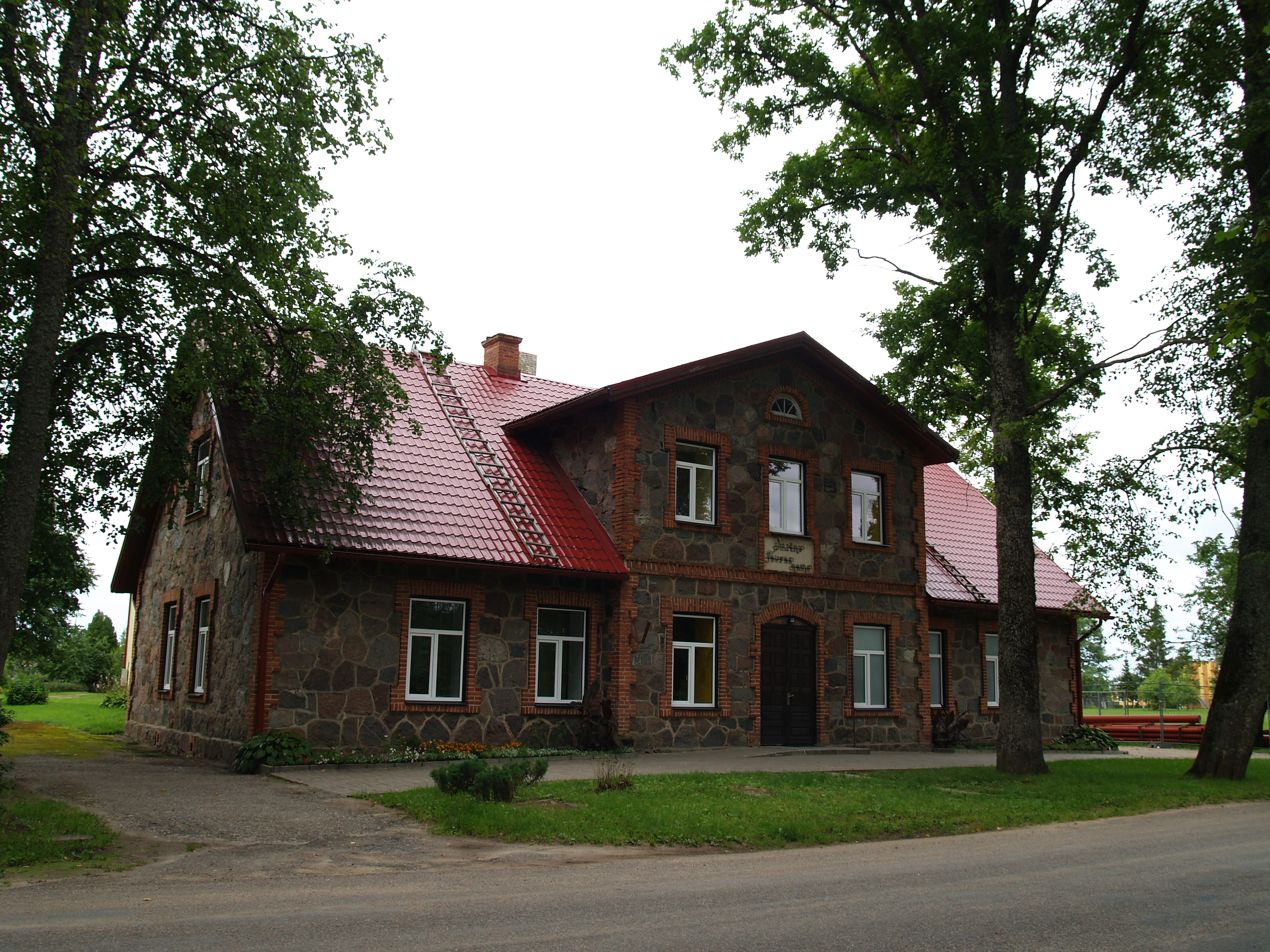
Cultural centre in Vilzēni village

== Towns, villages and settlements of Braslava parish ==
- Braslava
- Klāmaņi
- Urga
- Vilzēni
- Vilzēnmuiža
