= Staicele Parish =

Parish of Latvia

- parish of Latvia
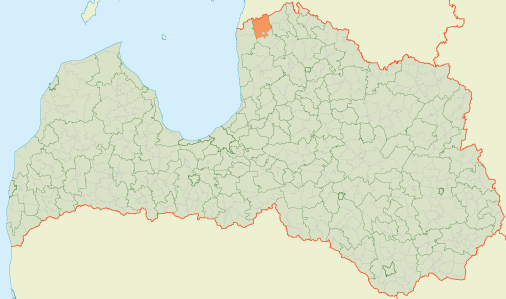
- 57°53′24″N 24°43′56″E
- Country: Latvia

Area
  - Total: 257.94 km^{2} (99.59 sq mi)
  - Land: 252.49 km^{2} (97.49 sq mi)
  - Water: 5.45 km^{2} (2.10 sq mi)

Population (1 January 2024)
  - Total: 486
  - Density: 1.9/km^{2} (4.9/sq mi)

Staicele parish (Latvian: Staiceles pagasts) is an administrative unit of Limbaži Municipality, Latvia. It was created in 2010 from the countryside territory of Staicele town. At the beginning of 2014, the population of the parish was 621.

== Towns, villages and settlements of Staicele parish ==
- Karogi
- Mārciemi
- Puršēni
- Rozēni
- Vīķi
