= Umurga Parish =

Parish of Latvia

- parish of Latvia
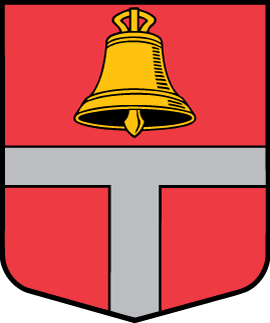
- Coat of arms

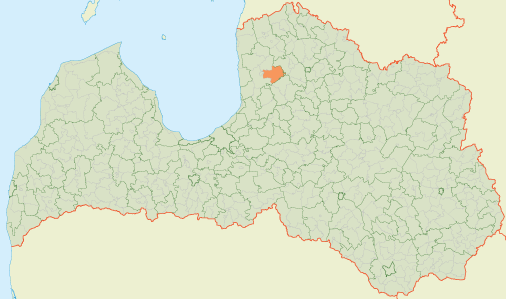
- Coordinates: 57°30′14″N 24°54′39″E
- Country: Latvia

Population (1 January 2026)
  - Total: 994

Umurga Parish (Latvian: Umurgas pagasts) is an administrative unit of Limbaži Municipality, Latvia. Its center is the village of Umurga.

== Villages and settlements ==
- Umurga (parish center)
- Augstrozes muiža
- Dārzciems
- Iesalkāja
- Ķītas
- Lidlauka ciems
- Mežaciems
- Oliņi
- Piķi
- Roperbeķi
- Serkuļi
- Slavenes
- Svētais ciems
- Vainiži
