= Limbaži Municipality =

Municipality of Latvia

Coordinates: 57°31′N 24°43′E

Limbaži Municipality Limbažu novads
- Municipality
- Flag Coat of arms

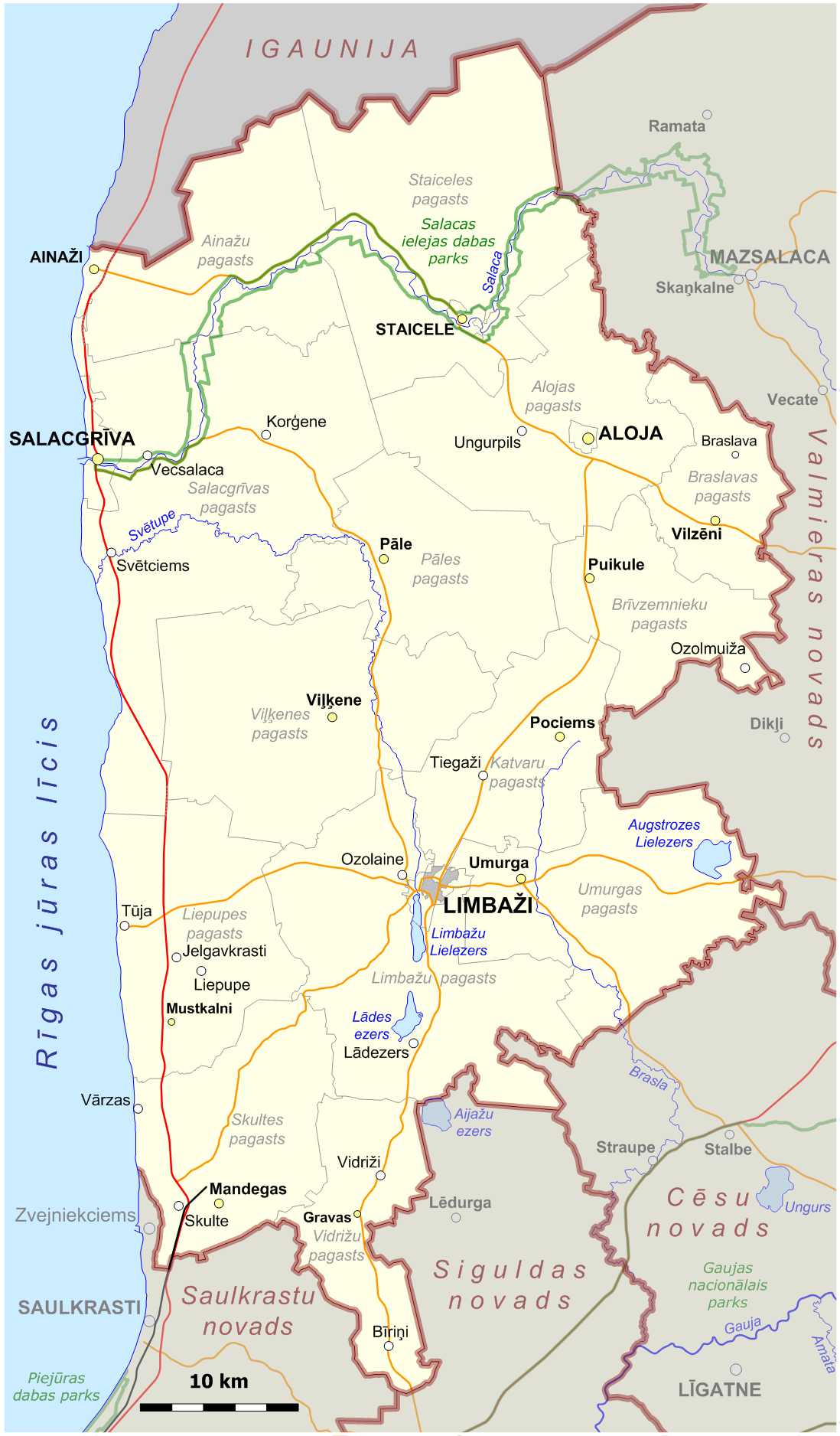
- Country: Latvia
- Formed: 2009
- Reformed: 2021
- Centre: Limbaži

Government
  - Council Chair: Sigita Upmale (Vidzeme Party)

Area
  - Total: 2,440.95 km^{2} (942.46 sq mi)
  - Land: 2,363.13 km^{2} (912.41 sq mi)

Population (2026)
  - Total: 27,276
  - Density: 11.542/km^{2} (29.894/sq mi)
- Website: www.limbazi.lv

Limbaži Municipality (Latvian: Limbažu novads) is a municipality in Vidzeme, Latvia. The municipality was formed in 2009 by merging Katvari Parish, Limbaži Parish, Pāle Parish, Skulte Parish, Umurga Parish, Vidriži Parish, Viļķene Parish and Limbaži town, with the administrative centre being Limbaži.

On 1 July 2021, Limbaži Municipality was enlarged when Aloja Municipality and Salacgrīva Municipality were merged into it. Since that date, Limbaži Municipality consists of the following administrative units: Ainaži Parish, Ainaži town, Aloja Parish, Aloja town, Braslava Parish, Brīvzemnieki Parish, Katvari Parish, Liepupe Parish, Limbaži Parish, Limbaži town, Pāle Parish, Salacgrīva Parish, Salacgrīva town, Skulte Parish, Staicele Parish, Staicele town, Umurga Parish, Vidriži Parish and Viļķene Parish. Latvian law defines the entire territory of Limbaži Municipality as a part of the region of Vidzeme. It borders Estonia.

== Population ==
More than 17,000 inhabitants live in Limbaži municipality.

Territorial unit	Population (year)
Katvari parish	1199 (2018)
Limbaži	7475 (2018)
Limbaži Parish	2205 (2018)
Pāle Parish	708 (2018)
Skulte Parish	2138 (2018)
Umurga Parish	1071 (2018)
Vidriži Parish	1370 (2018)
Viļķene Parish	1204 (2018)

== Twin towns — sister cities ==
Limbaži is twinned with:

- Anklam, Germany
- Klippan, Sweden
- Luninets, Belarus
- Panevėžys Municipality, Lithuania
- Pärnu, Estonia
- Radøy, Norway
- Sande, Norway
- Viljandi, Estonia
- Volkhov, Russia

== Notable people ==
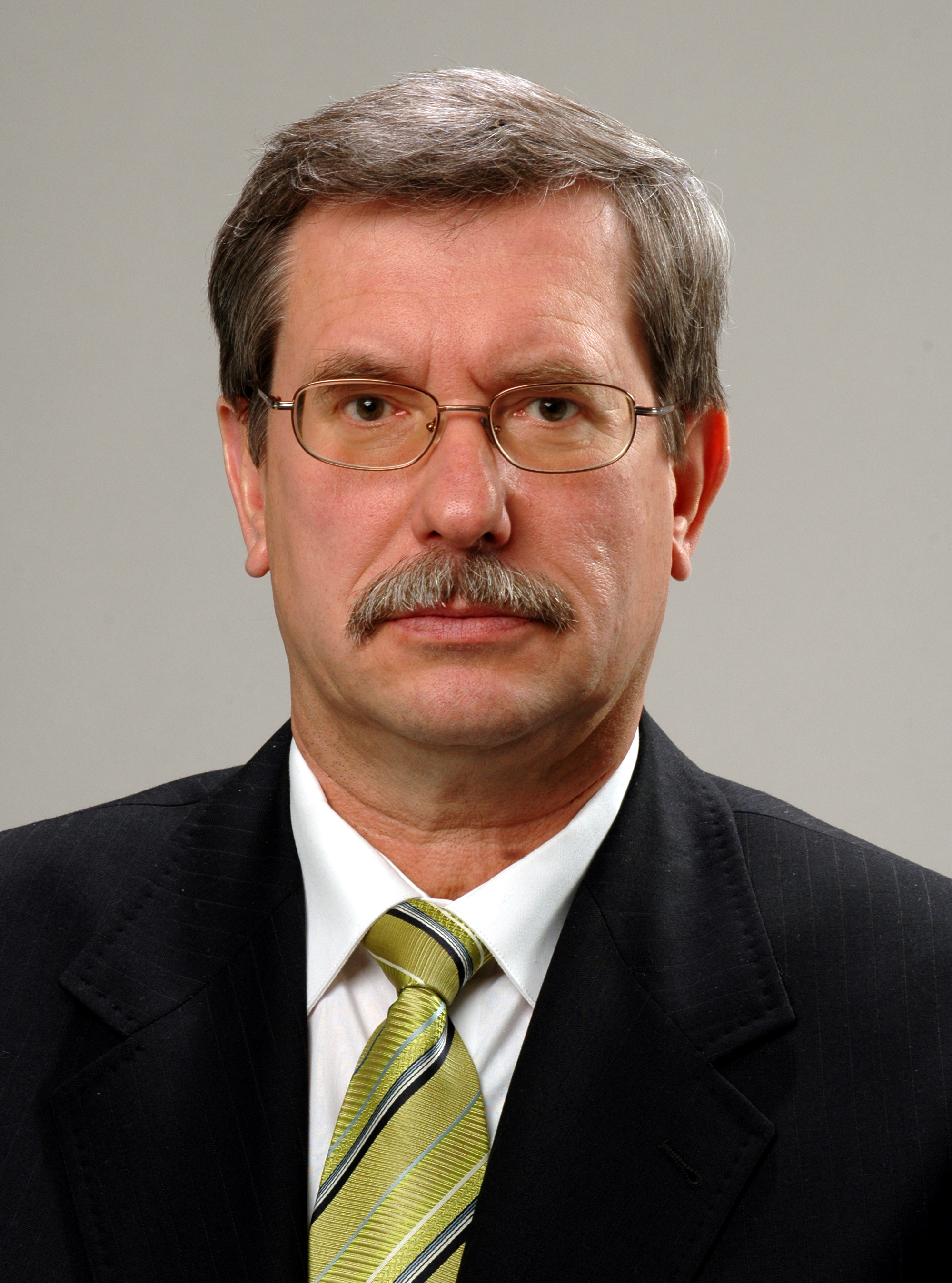
Indulis Emsis, 2004

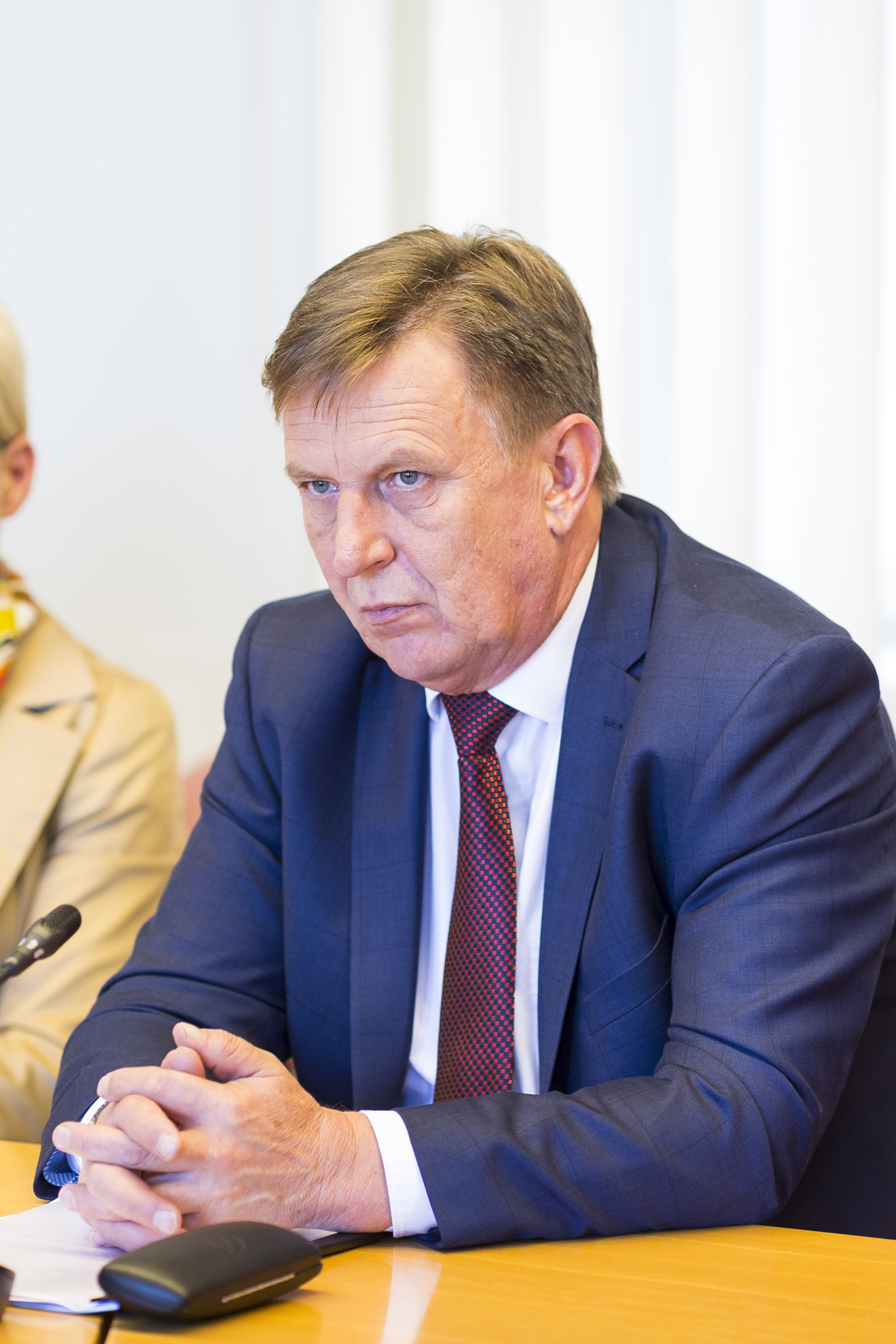
Māris Kučinskis, 2016

(see also Aloja, Latvia#Notable people)

- Gustav Flor (1829 in Vecsalaca – 1883), a Baltic German zoologist from Livonia.
- Kārlis Baumanis (1835 in Viļķene Parish – 1905), composer, author of the lyrics and music of Dievs, svētī Latviju! (“God bless Latvia!”), the national anthem of Latvia.
- Miķelis Krogzemis (1850 in Ungurpils – 1879), pen name Auseklis, a poet who wrote in Latvian and prominent member of the Young Latvians movement.
- Jānis Drēziņš (born 1868 Puntūzis – 1948), sea captain and the long-time head of the lighthouse system of Riga and Daugavgrīva
- Emilis Melngailis (1874 in Igate – 1954), composer, folklorist, and a master of choral songs
- Fricis Bārda (1880 in Pociems – 1919), poet, interested in philosophical and pantheistic themes
- Voldemārs Bastjānis (1884 in Pociems - 1975), politician, Minister of Finance, 1926 to 1927.
- Arvīds Brastiņš (1893 – 1984), sculptor, writer and neopagan leader
- Jānis Polis (1893 in Burtnieki – 1953), wrestler, he competed at the 1912 and 1924 Summer Olympics
- Ernests Blanks (1894 in Braslava Parish – 1972), writer and publicist; early public advocate of Latvia's independence in 1917.
- John Garklāvs (1898 in Umurga Parish – 1982), Archbishop of Chicago and the Midwest, 1957 to 1978.
- Kārlis Irbītis (1904 in Limbaži Parish –1997, a Latvian aeroplane designer.
- Arvīds Grigulis (1906 in Limbaži Parish – 1989), a Soviet writer, poet, playwright and literary scholar
- Lucia Peka (1912 in Umurga Parish – 1991), a Latvian-American artist, a painter of landscapes, figures, and still life
- Indulis Emsis (born 1952 in Salacgrīva), biologist and politician; Prime Minister of Latvia in 2004
- Māris Kučinskis (born 1961), politician, the 22nd Prime Minister of Latvia, from 2016 to 2019.

== Images ==
Coat of arms (2011–2021, interim 2021–2023)

== See also ==
- Administrative divisions of Latvia
