= Fricis Bārda =

Latvian poet (1880–1919)

- Fricis Bārda (1910)
- Born: January 25, 1880; Pociems (now Limbaži Municipality), Kreis Wolmar, Governorate of Livonia, Russian Empire
- Died: March 13, 1919 (aged 39); Rīga, Latvia
- Occupations: Teacher, school inspector
- Spouse(s): Paulīna Bārda (born Puskalne; 1890–1983)
- Relatives: Brother Antons Bārda (1891–1981)
- Writing career
- Language: Latvian
- Period: 1902–1919
- Genre: Poetry
- Notable works: Zemes dēls (Son of the Land), Dziesmas un lūgšanas Dzīvības Kokam (Songs and Prayers to the Tree of Life)
- Literary movement: Romanticism

Fricis Bārda (25 January 1880 – 13 March 1919) was a Latvian poet, particularly noted for his interest in philosophical and pantheistic themes.

== Biography ==
Fricis Bārda was born in the Pociema district, on the rural estate of Rumbiņi. He studied at the local school in Pociems, in Umurga, and at the Limbaži city school. From 1898 to 1901 he attended the Valka teachers seminary, then located in Rīga.

From 1901 he worked as an assistant teacher in Katlakalns's school, but in 1906 traveled to Vienna. There he studied philosophy, and followed concepts of idealism, and gained an enthusiasm for German Romantic writers.

After a year he returned to Latvia, and worked as a teacher at the Atis Ķeniņš's school in Rīga. During this period he contributed to the magazines "Stari" and "Zalktis", he met and associated with the composer Emīls Dārziņš, and the painter Janis Rozentāls. He also attended the drama lectures of Jēkabs Duburs.

In 1917 Bārda was a teacher at the high school he instituted in Valmiera, and later became a school inspector. He also became Reader in Latvian language and literature at the Baltic Technical Institute.

During most of latter part of the First World War, Bārda was a refugee in Russia. He returned to Latvia in 1918, but died in 1919 of a kidney disease he had been suffering from since his time in Vienna.

== Main works ==
In 1911 he published his first collection of poems, Zemes dēls (Son of the Land), and his only collection to be published during his lifetime. His other major collection, Dziesmas un lūgšanas Dzīvības Kokam (Songs and Prayers for the Tree of Life), was published in 1919.

Bārda is considered an exponent of romantic poetry, reacting to the prevalent realism of the preceding years. His treatments of traditional poetic themes – one's home land, love, nature, life, death, the soul, and eternity – are given original imagery and rhythms, and presented in philosophical generalisations.

His poems have been translated into Russian, English, German and Polish. Some of his poems have also been set to music.
