= Pāle Parish =

Parish of Latvia

- parish of Latvia
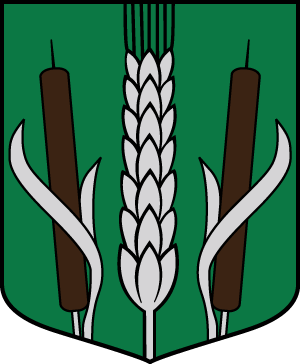
- Coat of arms

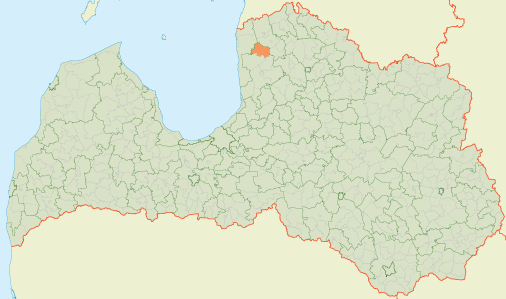
- Coordinates: 57°41′41″N 24°42′56″E
- Country: Latvia

Population (1 January 2026)
  - Total: 594

Pāle Parish (Latvian: Pāles pagasts) is an administrative unit of Limbaži and previously part of Limbaži district, Latvia.
