= Limbaži district =

Former district of Latvia

Coordinates: 57°31′N 24°43′E

Limbaži
- District
- Coat of arms

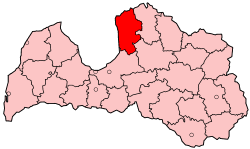
- Country: Latvia
- First established: 1949
- Dissolved: 2009
- Center: Limbaži

Area
  - Total: 2,580 km^{2} (1,000 sq mi)

Population
  - Total: 38,012
  - Density: 14.7/km^{2} (38.2/sq mi)
- Website: limbazi.lv/

Limbaži district (Latvian: Limbažu rajons) was an administrative division of Latvia, located in Vidzeme region, in the country's north-east, on the shore of the Baltic Sea. It bordered Estonia in the north, the former districts of Riga in the south and Valmiera in the east, and the Gulf of Riga in the west. It covered the territory of the medieval Livonian county of Metsepole. The main city in the district was Limbaži. About 50% of the Limbaži region consists of forest lands.

Districts were eliminated during the administrative-territorial reform in 2009. Limbaži district was split between Limbaži Municipality, Aloja Municipality, Krimulda Municipality and Salacgrīva Municipality.
