= Vidriži Parish =

Parish of Latvia

- parish of Latvia
- Coat of arms

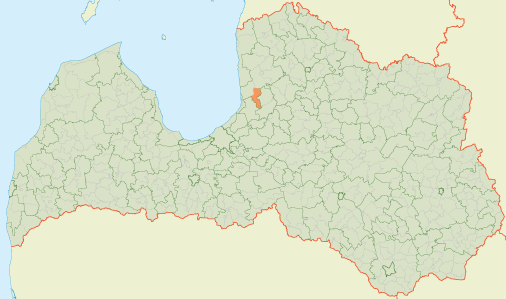
- Coordinates: 57°18′57″N 24°38′52″E
- Country: Latvia

Population (1 January 2026)
  - Total: 1,161
- Time zone: Eastern European Time

Vidriži Parish (Latvian: Vidrižu pagasts) is an administrative unit of Limbaži Municipality, in the Vidzeme region of Latvia.

== Towns, villages and settlements of Vidriži Parish ==
- Gravas (Limbaži Municipality), Latvia - parish administrative center
