= Staicele =

Town in Limbaži Municipality, Latvia

- Town
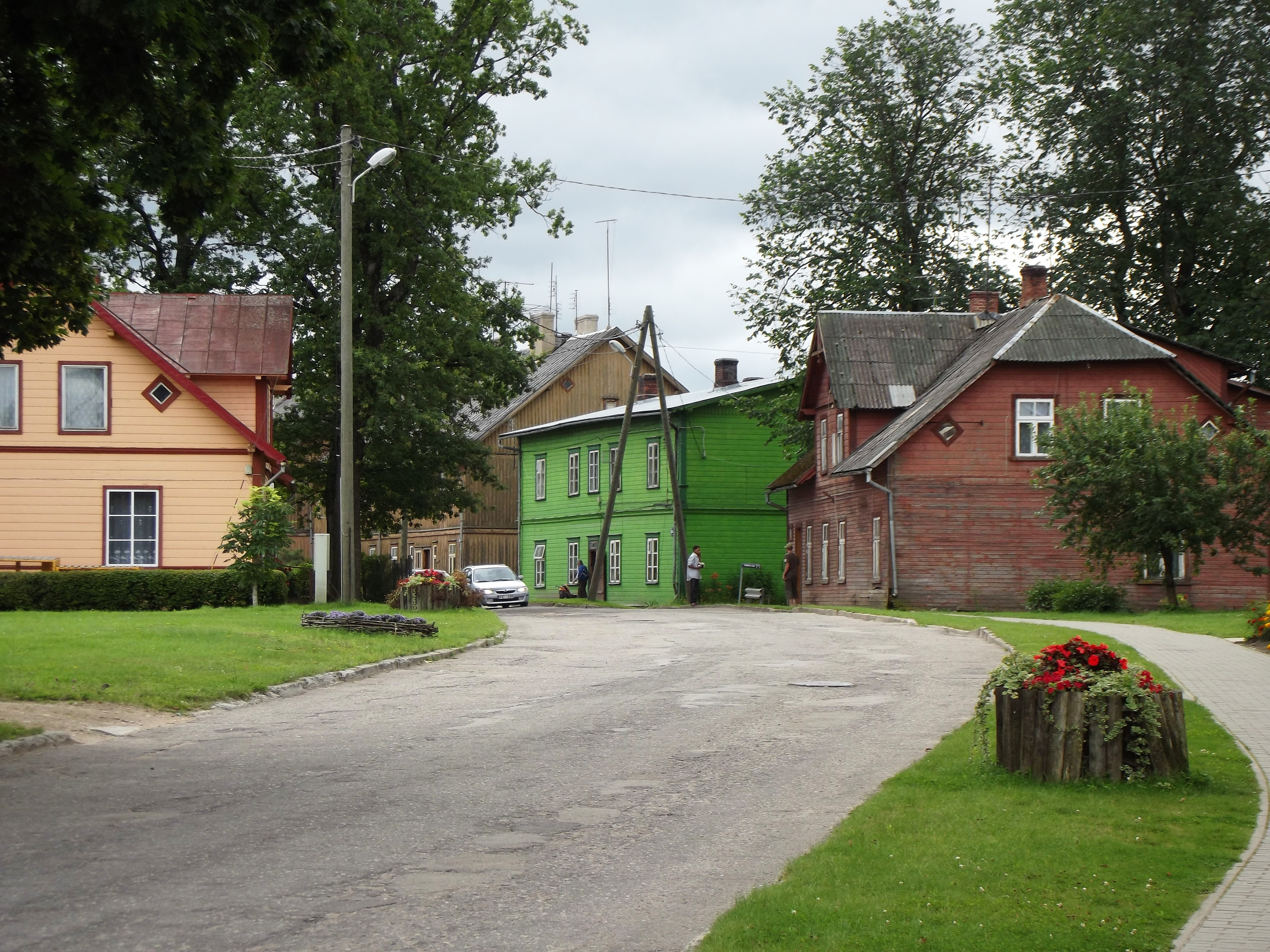
- Street in the Staicele

- Flag Coat of arms

- Location in Latvia
- Coordinates: 57°50′N 24°44′E
- Country: Latvia
- District: Limbaži Municipality
- Town rights: 1992

Area
  - Total: 4.04 km^{2} (1.56 sq mi)
  - Land: 3.86 km^{2} (1.49 sq mi)
  - Water: 0.18 km^{2} (0.069 sq mi)

Population (2026)
  - Total: 737
  - Density: 191/km^{2} (495/sq mi)
- Time zone: UTC+2 (EET)
  - Summer (DST): UTC+3 (EEST)
- Postal code: LV-4043
- Calling code: +371 640
- Website: http://www.staicele.lv/eng.php

Staicele (German: Staizel; Livonian: Staitsõl) is a town in Limbaži Municipality, in the Vidzeme region of Latvia. It is the birthplace of Latvian conductor Jānis Zirnis.

The area of Staicele has been inhabited only since the 19th century when a tavern and ferryman's house on the banks of Salaca river are mentioned. In 1887 the owners of Rozēni and Ungura manors built a bridge over Salaca in that place. In 1897 a paper mill was built and a larger settlement started to grow around it. In 1913 a narrow gauge railway line was built to the factory.

After the First World War Staicele became the centre of the Rozēni Parish. It received village status in 1925.

In the Latvian SSR, Staicele became an Urban-type settlement in 1950. It received town rights in 1992. From 2009 until 2021, Staicele town was part of the former Aloja Municipality.

== See also ==
- List of cities in Latvia
