= Gustav Flor =

Baltic German naturalist (1829–1883)

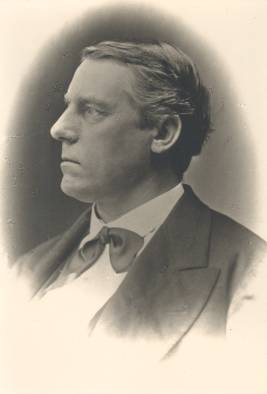
- Gustav Flor
- Born: 13 August [O.S. 1] 1829; Alt-Salis, Kreis Wolmar, Governorate of Livonia, Russian Empire (present-day Vecsalaca, Limbaži Municipality, Latvia)
- Died: 13 May [O.S. 1] 1883 (aged 53); Dorpat, Kreis Dorpat, Governorate of Livonia, Russian Empire (present-day Tartu, Tartu County, Estonia)
- Scientific career
- Fields: Zoology
- Institutions: Imperial University of Dorpat

Gustav August Adam Flor (13 August [O.S. 1 August] 1829 – 13 May [O.S. 1 May] 1883) was a Baltic German zoologist from Livonia.

== Life and career ==
Flor studied medicine and natural science at the Imperial University of Dorpat, later becoming a professor of zoology. In 1860, he became director of the zoological cabinet, which he remained until his death in 1883 (the zoological cabinet was the predecessor of the Zoology Museum at the University of Tartu, where his 11,815-specimen entomological collection still resides).

He is best known for his studies of Hemiptera, especially the two-volume work Die Rhynchoten Livlands in systematischer Folge beschrieben ("The Hemiptera of Livonia, Described In Systematic Order").

== Works ==
- Rhynchotorum Livonicorum descriptio Flor's 1856 thesis (Latin:"Description of Livonian Hemiptera")
- Die Rhynchoten Livlands in systematischer Folge beschrieben, v.1 (1860) (German)
- Die Rhynchoten Livlands in systematischer Folge beschrieben, v.2 (1861) (German)

== See also ==
- List of Baltic German scientists

== Sources ==
- "Флор, Густав" . Brockhaus and Efron Encyclopedic Dictionary (in Russian). 1906.
