= Ainaži Parish =

Parish in Limbaži Municipality, Latvia

- parish of Latvia
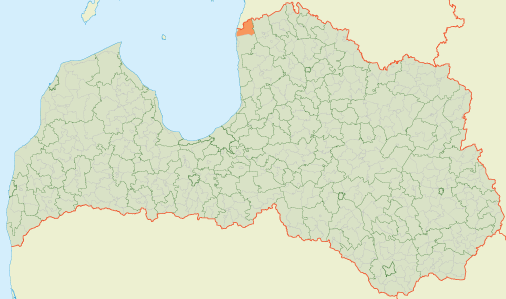
- 57°52′15″N 24°30′06″E
- Country: Latvia

Area
  - Total: 149.28 km^{2} (57.64 sq mi)
  - Land: 145.27 km^{2} (56.09 sq mi)
  - Water: 4.01 km^{2} (1.55 sq mi)

Population (1 January 2026)
  - Total: 381
  - Density: 2.62/km^{2} (6.79/sq mi)

Ainaži Parish (Latvian: Ainažu pagasts) is an administrative unit of Limbaži Municipality in the Vidzeme region of Latvia. It was created in 2010 from the countryside territory of Ainaži town, which serves as the extra-territorial centre of Ainaži Parish.

The population in 2025 was 381. At the beginning of 2014, the population of the parish was 527. At the beginning of 2019, the population of the parish was 663.

== Villages and settlements of Ainaži Parish ==
- Lampuži
- Mailīšciems
- Mērnieki
