= Katvari Parish =

Parish of Latvia

- parish of Latvia
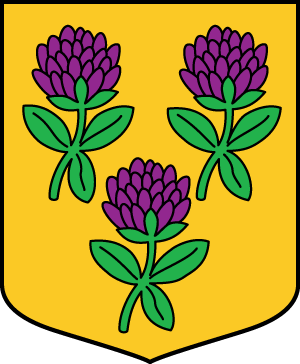
- Coat of arms

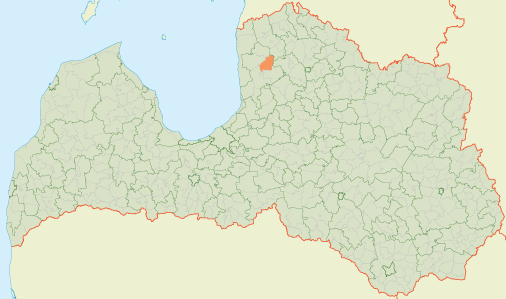
- Coordinates: 57°35′13″N 24°48′44″E
- Country: Latvia

Population (1 January 2026)
  - Total: 993

Katvari Parish (Latvian: Katvaru pagasts) is an administrative unit of Limbaži Municipality, Latvia.
