= Limbaži Parish =

Parish in Limbaži Municipality, Latvia

- parish of Latvia
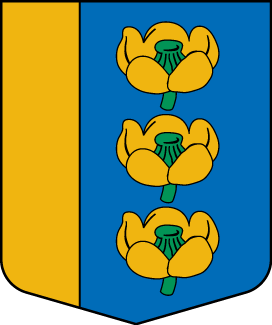
- Coat of arms

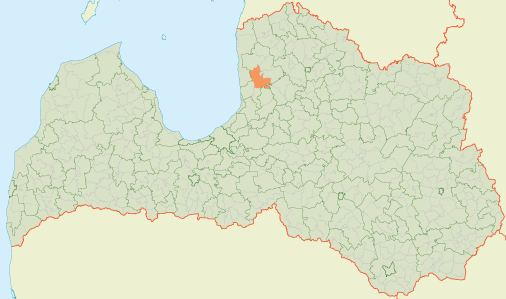
- Coordinates: 57°27′57″N 24°41′30″E
- Country: Latvia

Population (1 January 2026)
  - Total: 1,920

Limbaži Parish (Latvian: Limbažu pagasts) is an administrative unit of Limbaži Municipality, Latvia. The administrative center is the adjacent town of Limbaži, which is outside of the borders of the parish.

== Villages and settlements of Limbaži Parish ==
- Inte
- Jumpravmuiža
- Kaijciems
- Lāde
- Lādezers
- Langači
- Muižkalni
- Nabe
- Ozolaine
- Pelodas
- Stūrīši
