= Salacgrīva Parish =

Parish of Latvia

- parish of Latvia
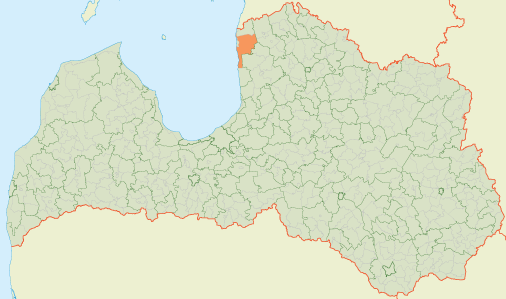
- Coordinates: 57°43′48″N 24°28′57″E
- Country: Latvia

Population (1 January 2026)
  - Total: 1,691

Salacgrīva parish (Latvian: Salacgrīvas pagasts) is an administrative unit of Limbaži Municipality in the Vidzeme region of Latvia. It was created in 2010 from the countryside territory of Salacgrīva town. At the beginning of 2014, the population of the parish was 2275.

== Towns, villages and settlements of Salacgrīva parish ==
- Salacgrīva – parish administrative center
- Korģene
- Kuiviži
- Lāņi
- Lauvas
- Svētciems
- Vecsalaca
- Zonepe
