= Ādolfs Alunāns =

Latvian actor, writer and playwright

- Born: 11 October 1848 Jelgava, Russian Empire (currently Latvia)
- Died: 5 July 1912 Jelgava, Russian Empire (currently Latvia)
- Occupations: Playwright, actor, director
- Spouses: Karolīne Klau, Angelika Buhta
- Children: Artūrs, Marija, Pēteris, Kolmārs, Elza, Zuzanna, Paula, Valda Valeska, Emīlija, Oļģerts
- Parents: Peter Allunans (father); Otīlija Alunāne (mother)

Adolfs Alunāns (11 October 1848 – 5 July 1912) was a Latvian actor, director and playwright. For his efforts and hard work in progressing Latvian Dramaturgy he received the title "father of Latvian theater". In 1968, the Jelgava's Adolf Alunans memorial museum was built.

== Childhood ==
Adolfs Alunāns was born in Jelgava, a town in Russian Empire (in present-day Latvia). His parents were Peter Alunāns, a well-known Latvian journalist, and Otilia Alunāne, daughter of the mayor of Jelgava. In youth Alunāns went to the Academia Petrina gymnasium and in his free time was strictly schooled by his uncle Juris Alunāns (a famous Latvian poet). After finishing the gymnasium, he was very well educated. He often went to the city theater with his grandfather Julius Felcke, who was a big theater admirer. These theater attendances gave Alunāns a big interest in theater art, that he will be driven by his whole life.

== Career ==
From 1866, he started working as an actor in German theater in Reval (now Tallinn) until 1870, when he was invited to lead the Latvian theater in Riga. While working in the Latvian theater he translated German plays to Latvian language and wrote his own, searched for new actors and organized their learning. In 1885, Alunāns stepped down and returned to live in his hometown Jelgava, where he continued to work as an actor, writer and journalist. In 1896, he created his own theater, which successfully worked until 1904, when his health got worse.

The artist died on 5 July 1912, in Jelgava where he was buried in cemeteries Jāņa Kapi (today Park d'Alunāns). In 1913, a monument was erected on its burial. Stolen twice in the time of independent Latvia, the bronze bas-relief executed by the sculptor Burkards Dzenis, the twice was found by the police in the spinning of scraps.

=== Most notable plays ===
- "Pašu audzināts" (1869)
- "Priekos un bēdās" (1871)
- "Mucenieks un muceniece" (1872)
- "Icigs Mozes" (1874)
- "Džons Neilands" (1881)
- "Kas tie tādi, kas dziedāja" (1888)
- "Lielpils pagasta vecākie" (1888)
- "Seši mazi bundzenieki" (1889)
- "Visi mani radi raud" (1891)
- "Pārticībā un nabadzībā" (1893)
- "Mūsu senči" (1905)
- "Draudzes bazārs" (1911)

=== Other works ===
- "Zobgala kalendārs" (1892—1912)
- "Ievērojami latvieši" (1–2, 1887–1890)
- "Jura Alunāna dzīve" (1910)
- "Atmiņas par latviešu teātra izcelšanos" (1924)
