= Aloja, Latvia =

Town in Limbaži Municipality, Latvia

Aloja
- Town
- Flag Coat of arms

- Location in Latvia
- Coordinates: 57°46′01″N 24°52′58″E
- Country: Latvia
- Municipality: Limbaži Municipality
- Town rights: 1992

Government
  - Mayor: Valdis Bārda

Area
  - Total: 2.65 km^{2} (1.02 sq mi)
  - Land: 2.64 km^{2} (1.02 sq mi)
  - Water: 0.01 km^{2} (0.0039 sq mi)
- Elevation: 217 m (712 ft)

Population (2026)
  - Total: 1,024
  - Density: 388/km^{2} (1,000/sq mi)
- Time zone: UTC+2 (EET)
  - Summer (DST): UTC+3 (EEST)
- Postal code: LV-40(64-65)
- Calling code: 640
- Website: www.aloja.lv

Aloja (German: Allendorf) is a town in Limbaži Municipality in the Vidzeme region of Latvia, situated close to the border with Estonia.

Aloja as a settlement was first mentioned in written sources in 1449. Aloja saw rapid development after Latvian agrarian reforms in 1920. In 1925, Aloja was granted a status of a village, and it also became a centre of the parish. In 1936, the new Rīga- Rūjiena railway line was constructed through Aloja. In 1992, Aloja was granted town rights. It was a part of Limbaži district until 2009. From 2009 until 2021, Aloja was the administrative center of the former Aloja Municipality.

Aloja is also the extra-territorial centre of the adjacent Aloja Parish, which until 2010 was the rural territory of the town of Aloja.

== Notable people ==
(see also Limbaži Municipality#Notable people)

- Ivar Smilga (1892 – 1937), a Bolshevik leader, Soviet politician and economist.
- Pāvils Dreijmanis (1895, in Aloja – 1953), architect
- Lauris Dzelzītis, (LV Wiki), (born 1978 in Aloja) actor

== Gallery ==
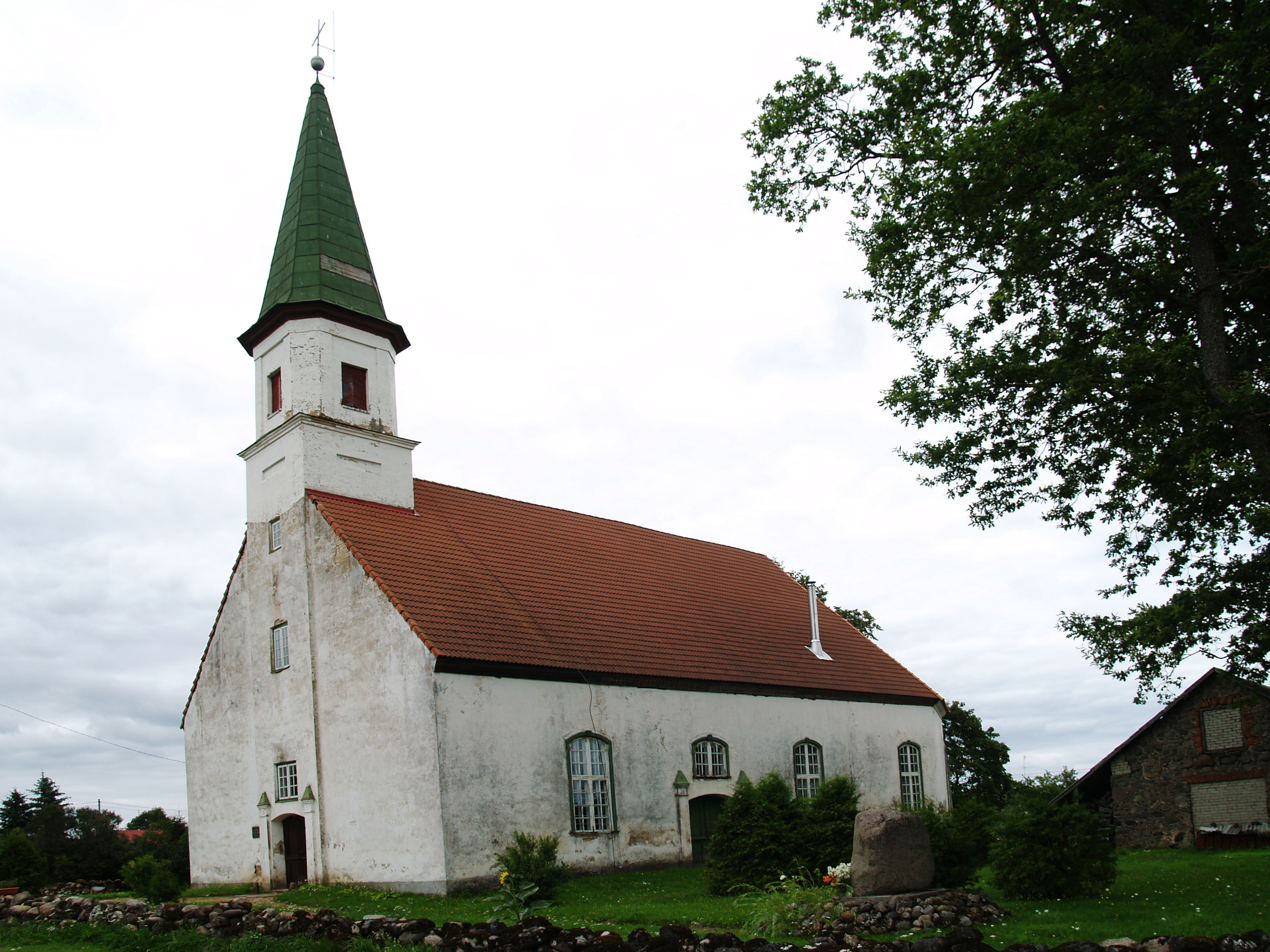
Aloja Lutheran church

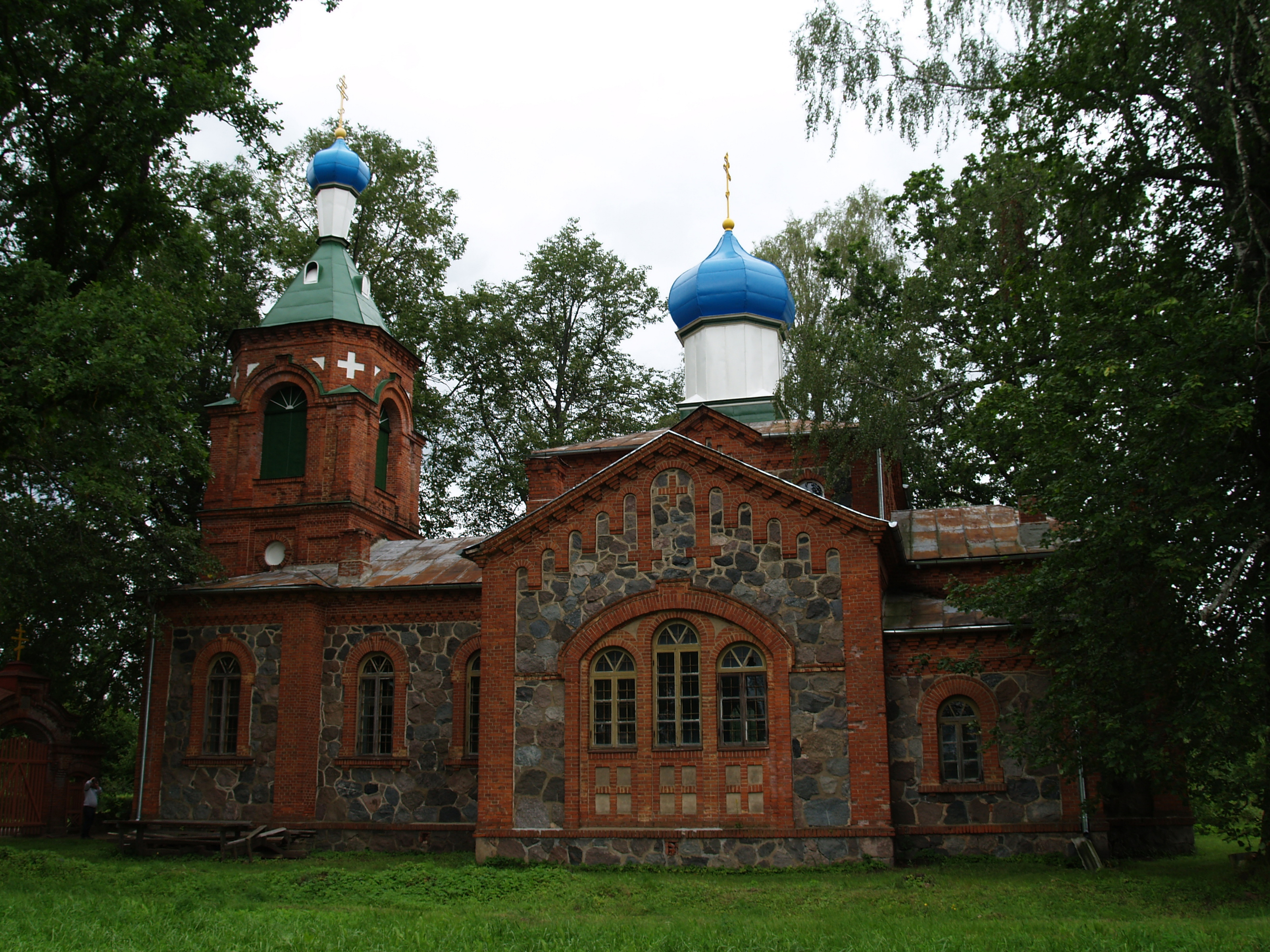
Aloja Orthodox church

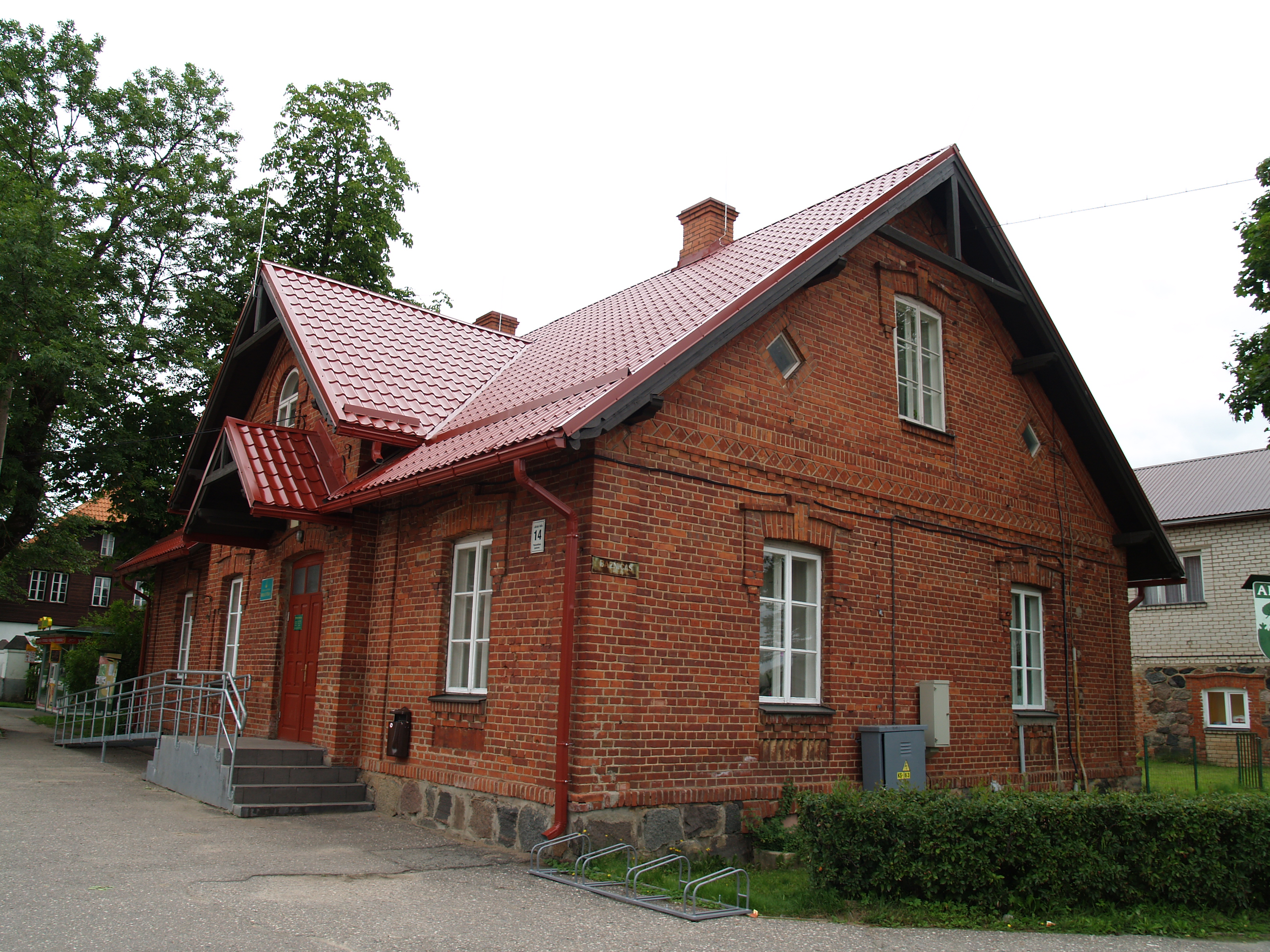
Aloja library

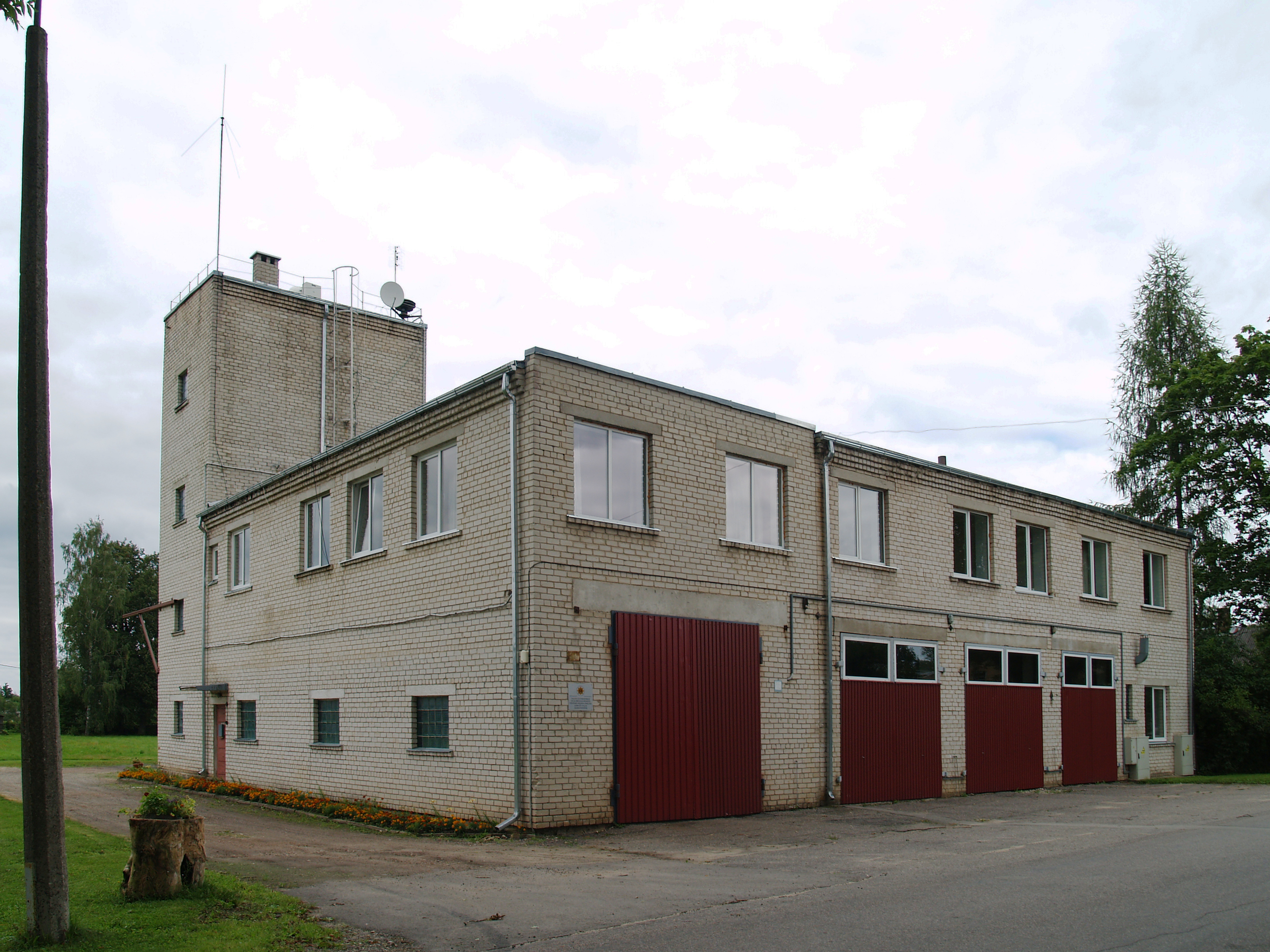
Aloja fire station
