= Aloja Parish =

Parish in Limbaži Municipality, Latvia

- parish of Latvia
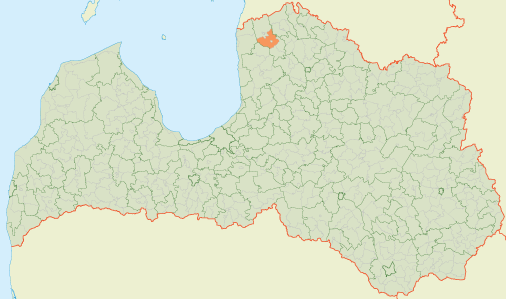
- 57°46′40″N 24°50′07″E
- Country: Latvia

Area
  - Total: 175.24 km^{2} (67.66 sq mi)
  - Land: 175.24 km^{2} (67.66 sq mi)
  - Water: 3.83 km^{2} (1.48 sq mi)

Population (1 January 2025)
  - Total: 673
  - Density: 3.84/km^{2} (9.95/sq mi)
- Website: www.aloja.lv

Aloja Parish (Latvian: Alojas pagasts) is an administrative unit of Limbaži Municipality, Latvia. It was created in 2010 from the countryside territory of Aloja town. Its center is located in the town of Aloja, which is not a part of the parish.

At the beginning of 2014, the population of the parish was 923.

== Villages and settlements of Aloja parish ==
- Nikšas
- Smilgas
- Stābeģi
- Ungurpils
