= Kārlis Baumanis =

Latvian composer

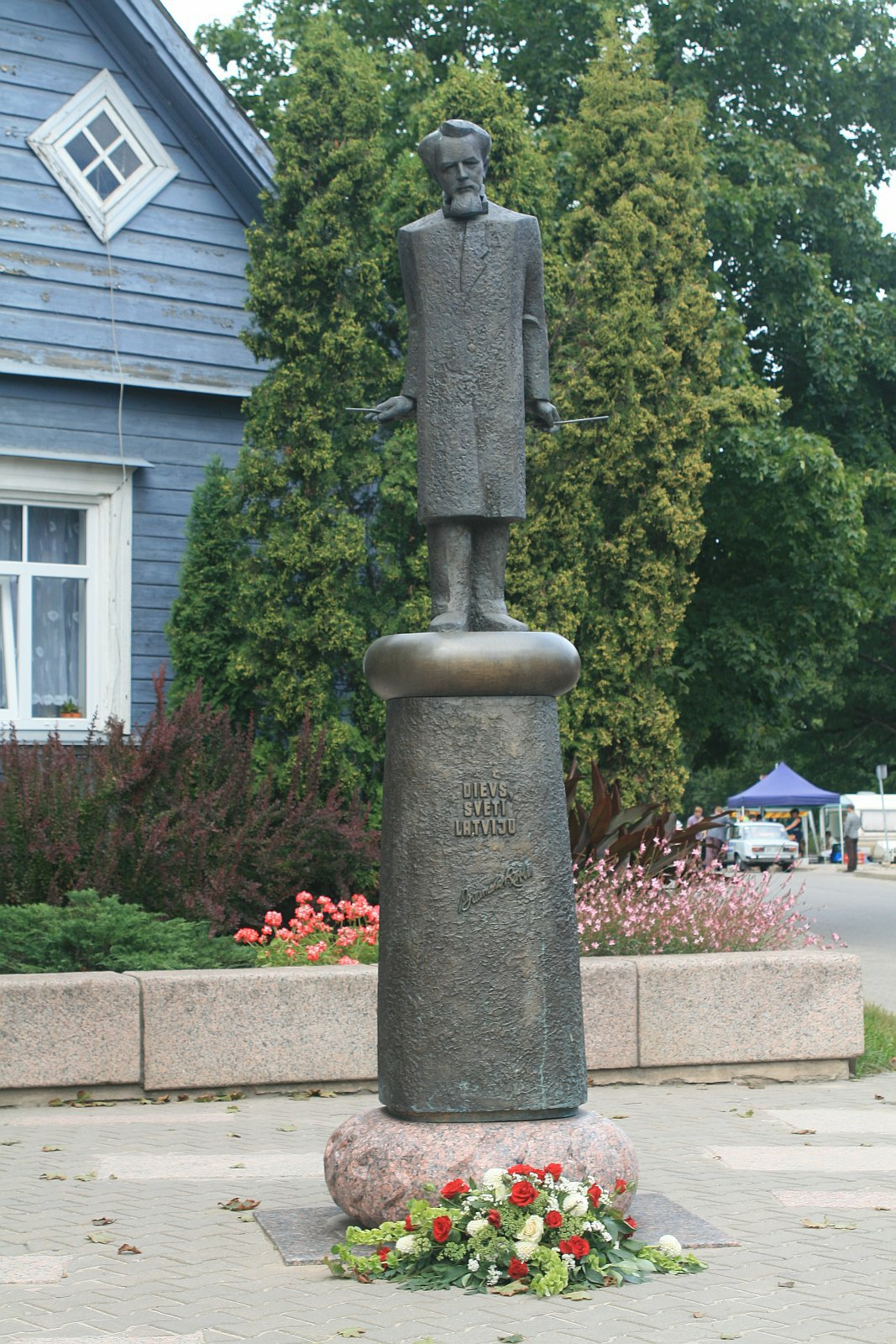
Monument of Kārlis Baumanis in Limbaži, Latvia

Kārlis Baumanis (11 May 1835 – 10 January 1905), better known as Baumaņu Kārlis, was an ethnic Latvian composer in the Russian Empire. He is the author of the lyrics and music of Dievs, svētī Latviju! (“God bless Latvia!”), the national anthem of Latvia.

Kārlis Baumanis was the first composer to use the word “Latvia” in the lyrics of a song, in the 19th century, when Latvia was still a part of the Russian Empire.

== Biography ==
Kārlis Baumanis was born on 11 May 1835, in Viļķene (Wilkenhof), in the family of peasants Jekab and Anna Baumanis. He wrote and composed the Latvian national anthem "God bless Latvia" in 1870. He lived and worked in Limbaži (Lemsal) as a teacher and a journalist. One of the most significant milestones of his lifetime was his election as the Speaker of Riga, Latvia, and becoming a Member of the Singing Commission in 1870, in which he played a tremendous role in preparing the First General Latvian Singing Festival. In the same year, he married Marija Carolini Elizabeth, the daughter of Ferdinand von Vite, the tenant of Sāra manor, and was a German teacher at the prestigious Smolny Institute of Exotic Nursery.

In 1871, he completed the composition studies with the Czech musician Voiceha Hlavach. On November 14, 1872, his daughter, Lilia Elizabeth, was born. In 1873, he was rewarded for his success in pedagogical work by the Holy Spirit. Anna's Order. Kārlis Baumanis died on 11 January 1905, in Limbaži at the age of 69.
