= Dievs, svētī Latviju! =

National anthem of Latvia

Dievs, svētī Latviju
English: 'God Bless Latvia'
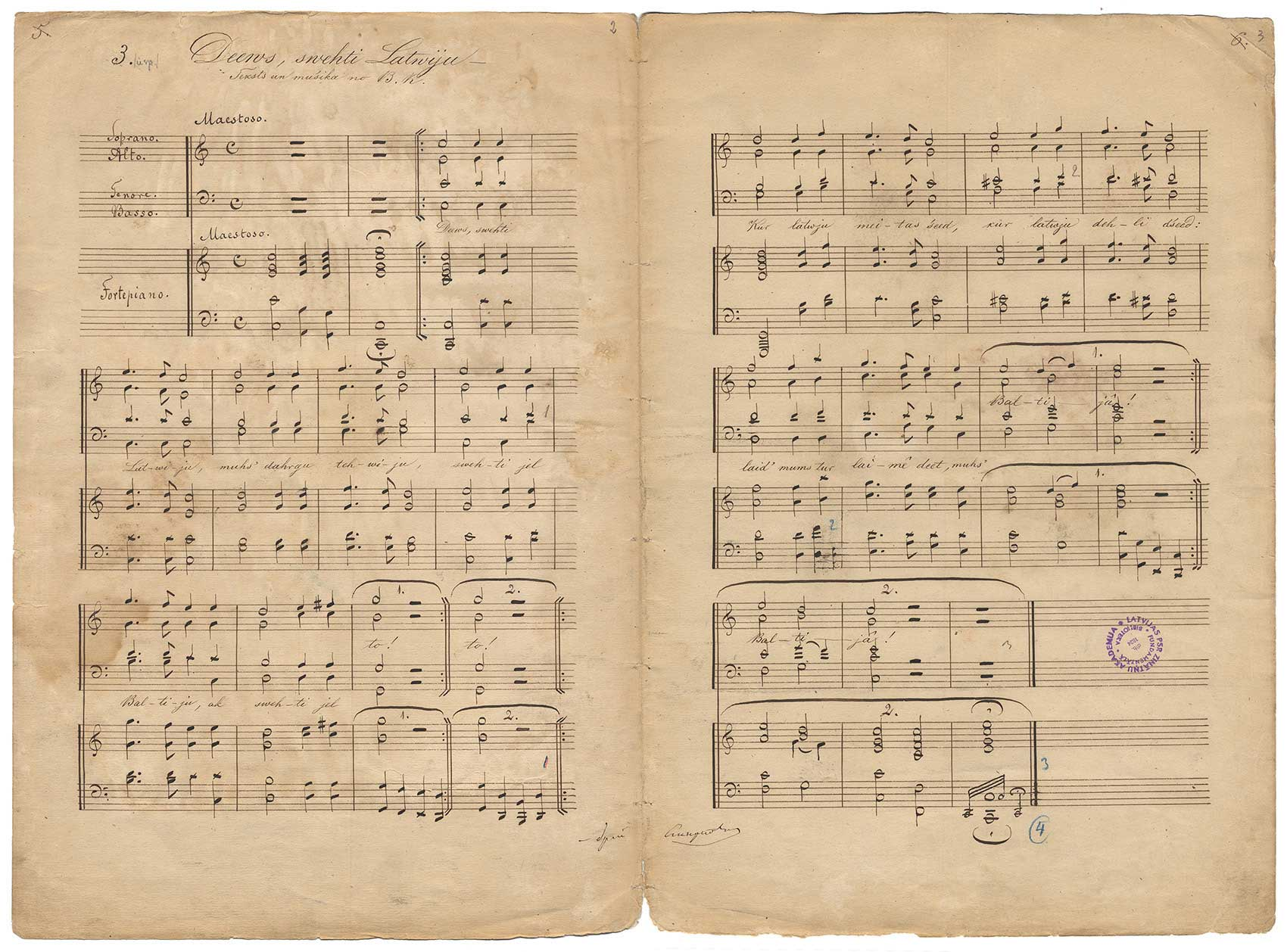
- Sheet music for the national anthem of Latvia in the handwriting of Kārlis Baumanis
- National anthem of Latvia
- Lyrics: Kārlis Baumanis, 1873
- Music: Kārlis Baumanis, 1873
- Adopted: June 7, 1920; 106 years ago
- Readopted: February 15, 1990; 36 years ago
- Relinquished: 1940; 86 years ago

Audio sample
- U.S. Navy Band instrumental rendition in B-flat major: file; help

1994 instrumental recording of Dievs, svētī Latviju!
Performed by the Latvian Army Orchestra.

"Dievs, svētī Latviju" (Note: Latvian pronunciation: [dʲiəʊ̯s ˈsvʲæːtʲiː ˈlˠɐtvʲɪjʊ]; lit. 'God Bless Latvia') is the national anthem of Latvia. Created in 1873 as a patriotic song, it did not gain official status until 1920.

== History ==
The music and lyrics were written in 1873 by Kārlis Baumanis, a teacher who was part of the Young Latvian nationalist movement. According to an article published in 1915 by Andrejs Stērste, a friend of Baumanis, he was trying to create competing version to a then popular song that began with the words "Dievs, svētī Kurzemi/Vidzemi" (lit. 'God Bless Kurzeme/Vidzeme') in order to create a song that would unite Latvians without requiring changes to the lyrics depending on the region where it was performed in. The earlier song had otherwise entirely different lyrics written by Frīdrihs Mālberģis, who published it in 1855 with an indiction that it was to be performed to the tune of "Heil dir im Siegerkranz" (which was one of several anthems that adopted the melody of the British anthem "God Save the King").

Baumanis's original lyrics were different from the modern ones: he used the term "Baltics" synonymously and interchangeably with "Latvia" and "Latvians", so "Latvia" was actually mentioned only at the beginning of the first verse. Later, the term "Latvia" was removed and replaced with "Baltics" to avoid a ban on the song. This has led to the misapprehension that the term "Latvia" was not part of the song until it was chosen as national anthem on June 7, 1920, and the word "Baltics" was replaced with "Latvia".

During the occupation of Latvia by the Soviet Union, the singing of "Dievs, svētī Latviju" was banned. The subsequently-established Latvian Soviet Socialist Republic had its own anthem. "Dievs, svētī Latviju" was restored as the state anthem of Latvia on February 15, 1990 – shortly before independence on May 4.

== Performance ==
The anthem's tune was modernized with a new F-major version that has been used since 2014; formerly, a G-major version was used on LTV's sign-on and sign-offs daily from 2011 to 2013. However, the G-major version was still played on any occasion (especially and notably, during times of mourning). The current version played on LTV for their sign-on and sign-offs daily is in the key of B-flat major.

== Lyrics ==
=== Current official ===
Latvian original

𝄆 Dievs, svētī Latviju!
Mūs' dārgo tēviju
Svētī jel Latviju
Ak, svētī jel to! 𝄇

𝄆 Kur latvju meitas zied
Kur latvju dēli dzied
Laid mums tur laimē diet
Mūs' Latvijā! 𝄇

IPA transcription (Note: See Help:IPA/Latvian and Latvian phonology.)

𝄆 [diæʊ̯s | ˈsvɛː.tiː ˈlɑt.vi.ju ‖]
[muːs‿ˈdɑːr.guɔ̯ ˈtɛː.vi.ju]
[ˈsvɛː.tiː jɛl ˈlɑt.vi.ju]
[ɑk | ˈsvɛː.tiː jɛl tuɔ̯ ‖] 𝄇

𝄆 [kur lɑt.vju ˈmɛi̯.tɑs‿zi̯æd]
[kur ˈlɑt.vju ˈdɛː.li dzi̯æd]
[lɑi̯d mums tur ˈlɑi̯.mɛː di̯æt]
[muːs‿ˈlɑt.vi.jɑː ‖] 𝄇

English translation

𝄆 God bless Latvia!
Our beloved fatherland,
Do bless Latvia,
O do bless it! 𝄇

𝄆 Where Latvian daughters bloom,
Where Latvian sons sing,
Let us dance in happiness there,
In our Latvia! 𝄇

== Other uses ==
- The Viesturdārzs park of Riga have a monument to Kārlis Baumanis with the music sheet of Dievs, svētī Latviju! on it.
- Latvian 2 euro coins bear the inscription DIEVS SVĒTĪ LATVIJU around the edge.

== See also ==
- Flag of Latvia
- Coat of arms of Latvia
