= Limbaži =

Town and capital of Limbaži Municipality, Latvia

- Town
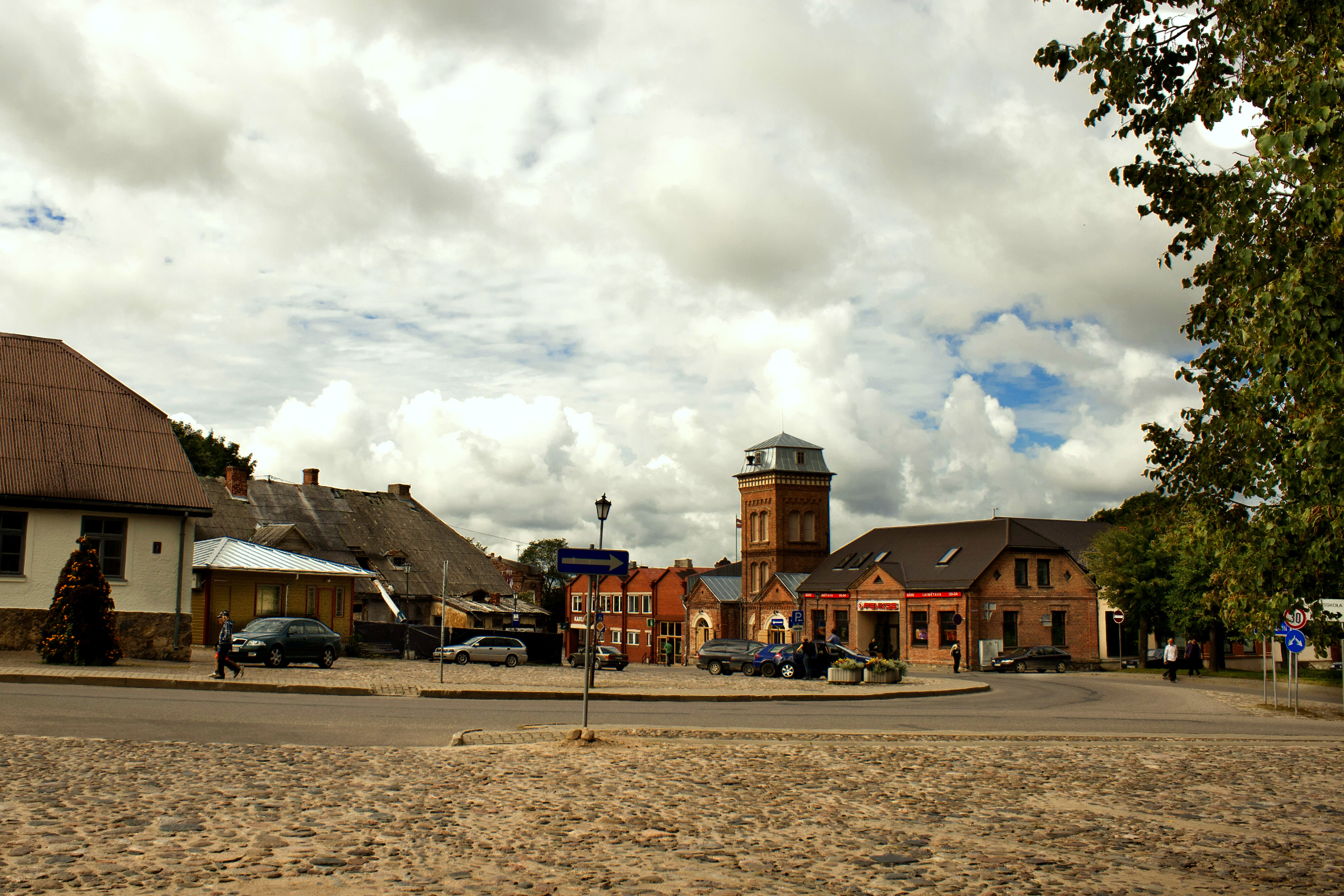
- Limbaži old town

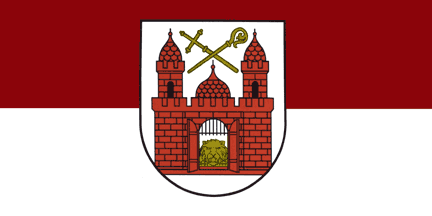
- Flag Coat of arms

- Location in Latvia
- Coordinates: 57°31′N 24°43′E
- Country: Latvia
- District: Limbaži municipality
- City status: 1385

Government
  - Mayor: Sigita Upmale

Area
  - Total: 9.29 km^{2} (3.59 sq mi)
  - Land: 8.29 km^{2} (3.20 sq mi)
  - Water: 1 km^{2} (0.39 sq mi)

Population (2026)
  - Total: 6,410
  - Density: 773/km^{2} (2,000/sq mi)
- Time zone: UTC+2 (EET)
  - Summer (DST): UTC+3 (EEST)
- Postal code: LV-4001
- Calling code: 640
- Website: http://www.limbazi.lv

Limbaži (Estonian: Lemsalu, German: Lemsal, Livonian: Limbaž) is a town and the center of Limbaži Municipality in the Vidzeme region of northern Latvia, with a population of 6,888. Limbaži is located 90 km northeast of the capital Riga. During the Middle Ages, as part of Livonia, Limbaži was a fortified town with stone walls, second in importance only to Riga.

== Etymology ==
The name is believed to be a Latvianised version (hence the -aži ending) of the Livonian word Lembsel (Lemesel) meaning "wide isle in a forest swamp". The German Lemsahl (Lemsal) is derived from the Livonian name.

According to folk etymology, the name Limbaži originated sometime in the 17th century. A recently arrived Swedish minister overheard the words "Limba" and "āži" (Latvian for 'male goats'). Mistakenly, he assumed this was the name of the place, and so the town was called "Limbaži".

== History ==
In ancient times, Limbaži was a Livonian settlement known as Lemisele, part of Metsepole. In the early 13th century, Bishop Albert and the Teutonic knights destroyed the village while conquering Metsepole, and built a castle, around which formed the new city, Lemsahl.

=== Medieval Limbaži ===
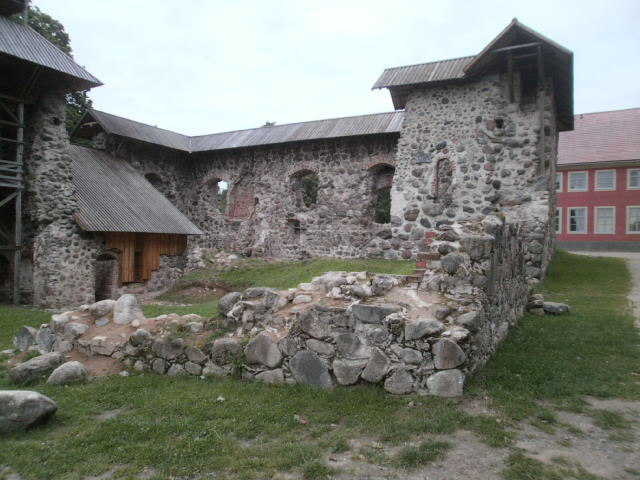
Limbaži Medieval Castle Ruins

Until the beginning of the 16th century, Lemsahl could be reached by seagoing vessels travelling up the Svētupe. Ships came from as far as Lübeck and Copenhagen to trade for honey, wax, lumber, grain, and furs. The small trading camp surrounding the castle grew into a large town, and was admitted to the Hanseatic League. Each year, Lemsahl hosted a conference attended by barons from all over Livonia, and the city hosted at least three other fairs throughout the year as well. During these fairs, the town may have held as many as 20,000 people at once. In addition, the Archbishops of Riga made Lemsahl his spring residence, which became a walled city to protect both the bishop and the trading center. At the time, in population Lemsahl was second only to Riga. The Limbaži Castle is one of the oldest fortified buildings in Latvia.

By 1500, however, the Svētupe became too shallow to navigate. Goods were sent elsewhere, and Lemsahl began a century long decline. During the Livonian War, Ivan the Terrible's forces burned down Lemsahl in 1558, while its residents fled to the nearby forests and marshes for shelter. The city was burned down by the Swedes in 1567, and again by the Russians in 1575. In 1602, the Swedes and Poles fought yet again for the city, completely demolishing its fortifications and walls. By the time the wars had ended, the city was so demolished, only three houses and a handful of residents remained.

=== 18th and 19th centuries ===
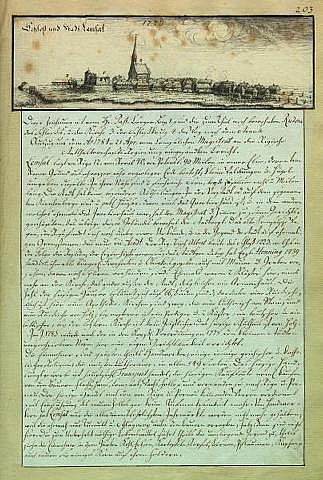
Panorama of Limbaži after the great fire of 1747

While under Swedish rule, the village was renamed Limbaži sometime in the 17th century. During the Great Northern War, Vidzeme was totally ravaged by Peter the Great's forces. But, as the story goes, while searching for Limbaži, the Russian army got lost in a heavy fog. After repeatedly going around in circles, the soldiers began to believe such a village may not exist after all, and moved on. Limbaži survived the war unscathed.

The city completely burned down again in 1747, after which today's city layout began to develop. In the 19th century, the city began to grow again. In 1821 there were 674 inhabitants, but by 1900 there were about 2000. In 1876, hat-maker A. Tīls opened "Limbažu filcs" (Limbaži Felt), the town's oldest company, which also secured jobs for generations of the city's inhabitants. The first town library was built in the late 19th century, and several publishing houses were opened, the largest of which was K. Paucīsis Press.

=== Twentieth century ===
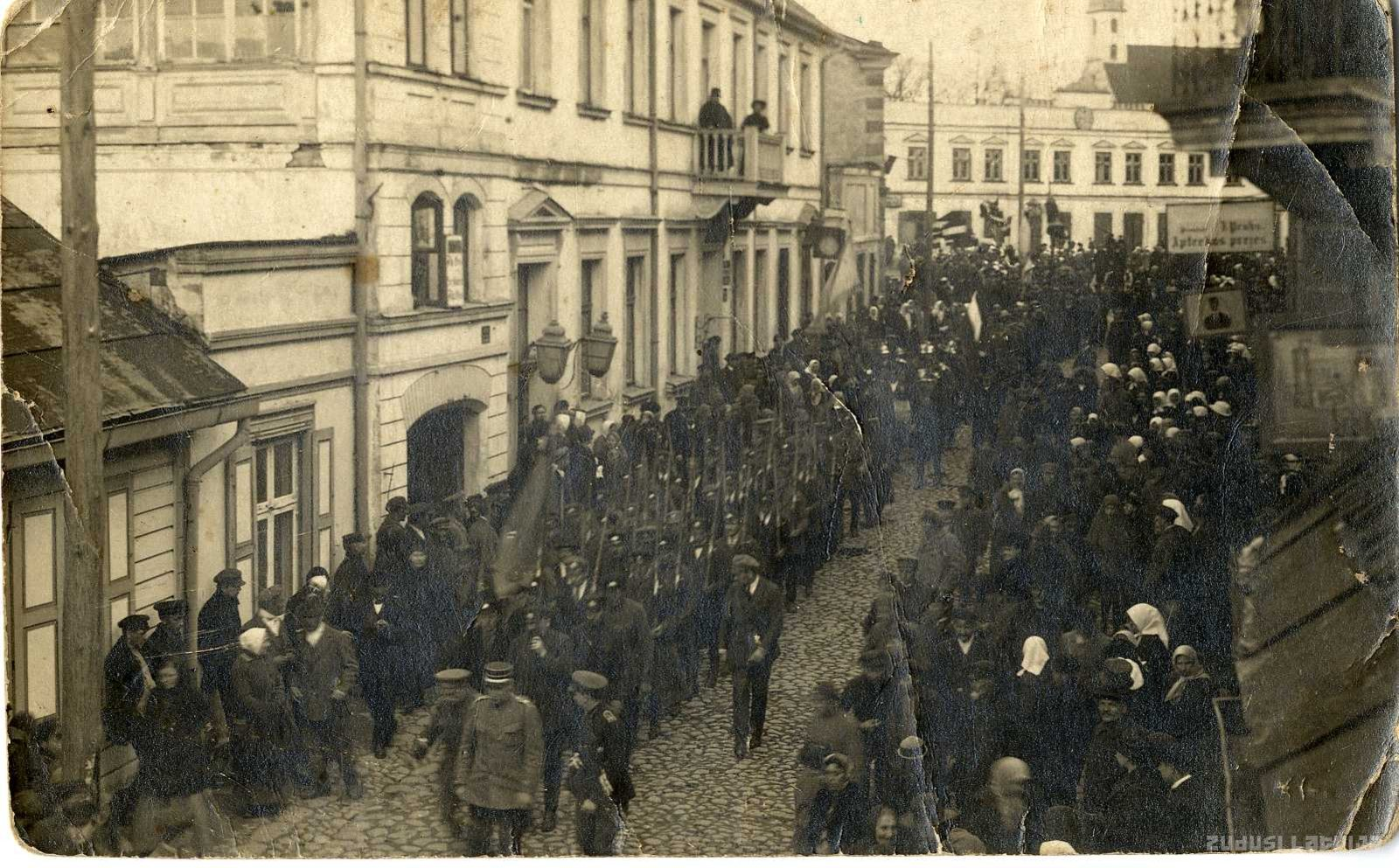
The march of soldiers mobilized by the Latvian Provisional Government along Jūras Street in Limbaži in 1919

After World War I Limbaži continued to grow as a center of commerce and crafts. The long-awaited rail line to Riga opened in 1934, and a 50-bed hospital opened in 1936. The House of Unity (Latvian: Vienības nams) cultural center was unveiled in 1939. During World War II, Limbaži was under German occupation from 4 July 1941 until 26 September 1944. During the Soviet occupation the population increased to 8,000, with many five-storey Soviet-style apartments appearing in the 1960s. During the Soviet period, Limbaži became a factory-town with the "Lauktehnika" farm machinery center, "Limbažu filcs" felt hat factory and "Limbažu piens" – one of the largest milk processors in Latvia – all based there.

== Demographics ==
Historical population

Year	Pop.	±% p.a.
around 1385	around 6000	—
1622	12	—
1773	549	+2.56%
1800	600	+0.33%
1840	877	+0.95%
1863	1,134	+1.12%
1881	1,814	+2.64%
1897	2,412	+1.80%
1915	5,000	+4.13%
1914	4,700	−6.38%
1920	2,501	−9.98%
1925	3,085	+4.29%
1930	2,935	−0.99%

Year	Pop.	±% p.a.
1935	2,870	−0.45%
1943	2,806	−0.28%
1959	4,823	+3.44%
1970	5,791	+1.68%
1979	8,257	+4.02%
1989	9,985	+1.92%
1997	9,522	−0.59%
2000	9,179	−1.22%
2004	8,934	−0.67%
2007	8,686	−0.93%
2008	8,657	−0.33%
2009	8,619	−0.44%
2010	8,559	−0.70%

Year	Pop.	±% p.a.
2011	8,406	−1.79%
2012	8,290	−1.38%
2013	8,186	−1.25%
2014	8,022	−2.00%
2015	7,957	−0.81%
2016	7,805	−1.91%
2017	7,652	−1.96%
2018	7,498	−2.01%
2019	7,393	−1.40%
2020	7,306	−1.18%
2021	7,253	−0.73%
2022	7,139	−1.57%

== Notable residents ==
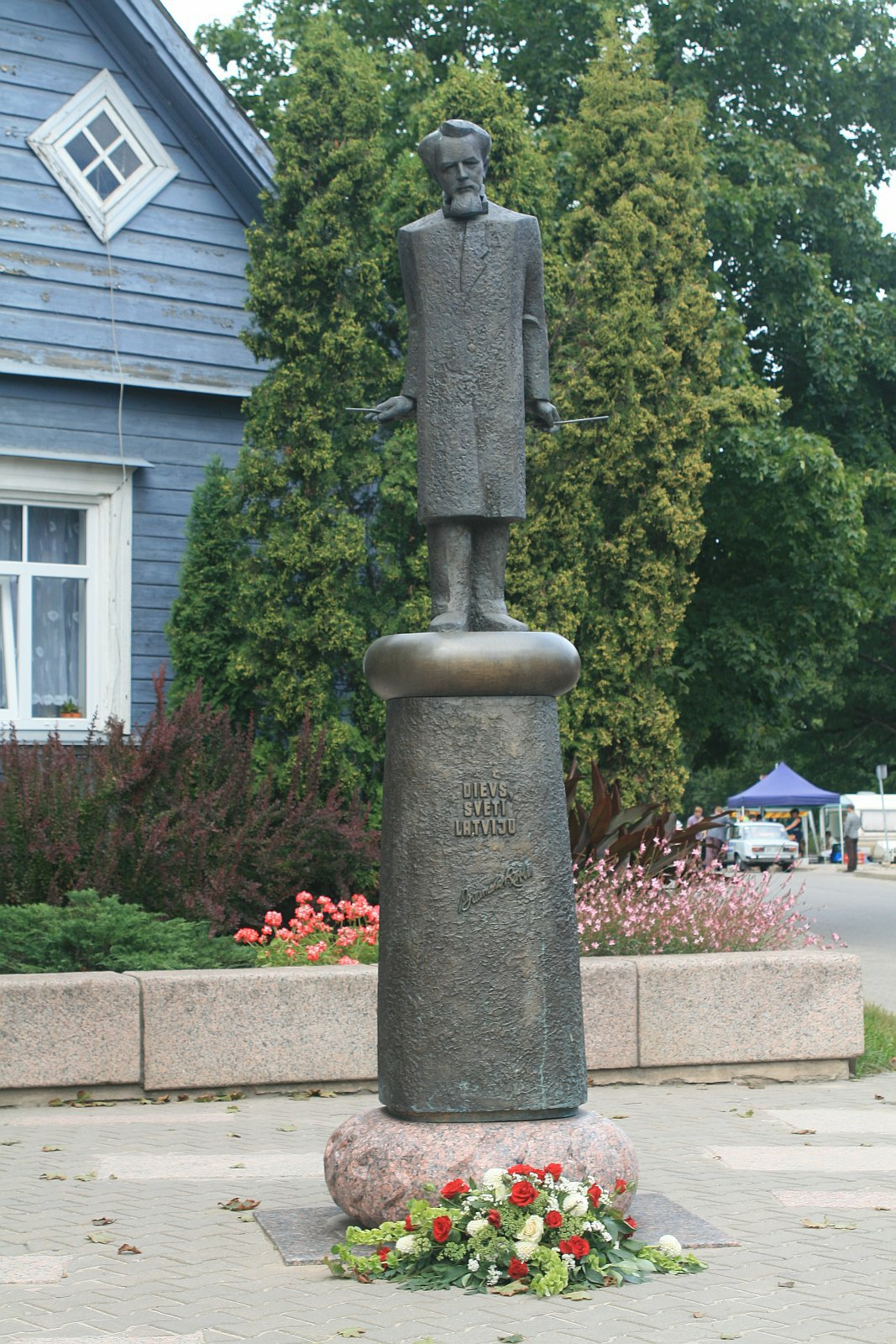
Monument to Kārlis Baumanis in Limbaži. Composer of the Latvian national anthem.

- Alexander Heubel (1813 – 1847), romantic painter, influenced by German Romanticism.
- Kārlis Baumanis (1835 – 1905), composer of the Latvian national anthem, "Dievs, svētī Latviju!"

=== Sport ===
- Artis Lazdiņš (born 1986), footballer who played 240 games and 29 for Latvia
- Jānis Kalniņš (born 1991), ice hockey player
- Mārcis Ošs (born 1991), footballer, played over 300 games and 27 for Latvia
- Jānis Bērziņš (born 1993), basketball player
- Emīls Birka (born 2000), footballer, has played over 230 games

== Notable locations ==
- Limbaži Old Town, with remains of the town wall
- Ruins of the Archbishop's castle
- Limbaži History Museum
- Livonian hill-fort at Ķezberkalns
- St. John Lutheran Church (Latvian: Sv. Jāņa luterāņu baznīca)
- Kārlis Baumanis' grave and monument
- Limbažu Lielezers (Lake Limbaži)
- The national Olympic training center for canoeing and kayaking is situated in Limbaži

== Twin towns – sister cities ==
Limbaži is twinned with:

- Alver, Norway
- Anklam, Germany
- Klippan, Sweden
- Luninets, Belarus
- Panevėžys District Municipality, Lithuania
- Sande, Norway
- Volkhov, Russia

== See also ==
- Auseklis Limbaži Theatre
