= Valmiera county =

18th–20th century county in Latvia

Valmiera County: Valmieras apriņķis; Kreis Wolmar; Вольмарскій уѣздъ
- County
- Coat of arms

- County in 1940 within Latvia
- Country: Russian Empire; Latvia
- Russian Governorate: Livonia
- Established: 1745
- Abolished: 1949
- Capital: Valmiera (Wolmar)

Area
  - Total: 4,959.78 km^{2} (1,914.98 sq mi)

Population (1897)
  - Total: 112,826
  - Density: 22.7482/km^{2} (58.9175/sq mi)

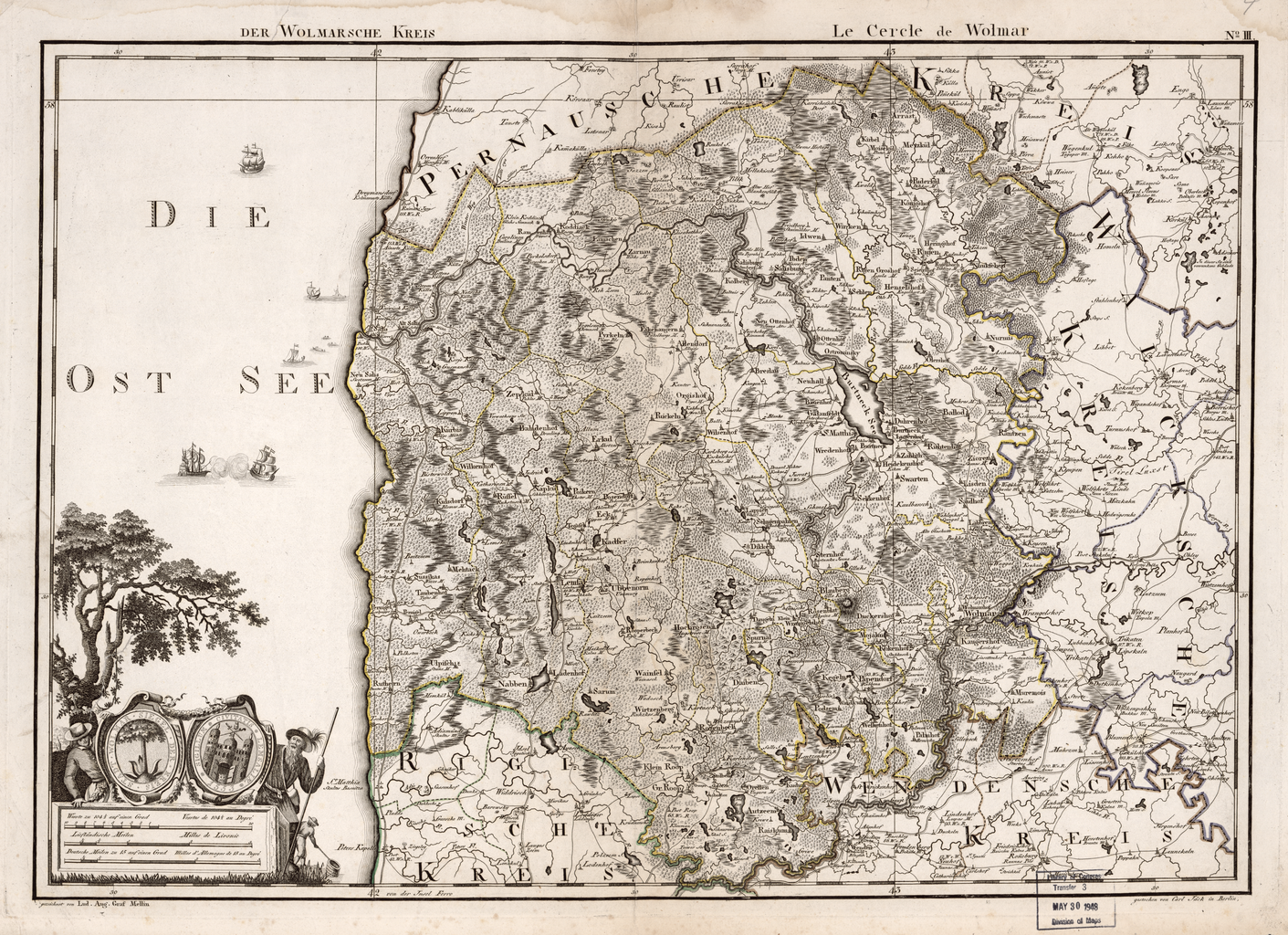
Valmieras apriņķis (Wolmarsche Kreis) on the map of Ludwig August Mellin (1798).

The county within the Governorate of Livonia of the Russian Empire

Valmiera county (Latvian: Valmieras apriņķis, German: Kreis Wolmar, Russian: Вольмарскій уѣздъ, romanized: Vol'marskiy uyezd) was a historic county of Latvia and the Russian Empire. Its capital was Valmiera (Wolmar).

== History ==
The county of Valmiera was created during the administrative territorial reform of the Governorate of Riga in 1783 by merging of parishes from the preexisting Kreis Riga and Kreis Pernau.

After the establishment of the Republic of Latvia in 1918, the Valmieras apriņķis existed until 1949, when the Council of Ministers of the Latvian SSR split it into the newly created districts of Valmiera and Rūjiena (dissolved in 1959).

== Demographics ==
At the time of the Russian Empire Census of 1897, Kreis Wolmar had a population of 112,836. Of these, 93.3% spoke Latvian, 3.2% Estonian, 2.0% German, 0.8% Russian, 0.5% Yiddish, 0.1% Romani and 0.1% Polish as their native language.

== Divisions ==
In 1913, Valmiera county had 56 parishes and 2 towns:

Parishes

- Ainaži Parish (Haynasch)
- Arakste Parish (Arras)
- Augstroze Parish (Hochrosen)
- Matīši Parish (Bauenhof)
- Braslava Parish (Breslau)
- Burtnieki Parish (Burtneck)
- Dauguļi Parish (Daugeln)
- Dikļi Parish (Dickeln)
- Idus Parish (Idwen)
- Ipiķi Parish (Ippik)
- Bērzaine Parish (Sternhof)
- Jeri Parish (Seyershof)
- Katvari Parish (Kadfer)
- Kauguri Parish (Kaugershof)
- Kocēni Parish (Kokenhof)
- Ķieģeļu Parish (Kegeln)
- Ķirbižu Parish (Kürbis)
- Ķoņi Parish (Königshof)
- Lādes Parish (Ladenhof)
- Lielstraupes Parish (Groß-Roop)
- Limbaži Parish (Schloß Lemsal)
- Lode Parish (Metzküll)
- Mazstraupes Parish (Klein-Roop)
- Mujānu Parish (Mojahn)
- Mūru Parish (Muremoise)
- Nabes Parish (Nabben)
- Naukšēni Parish (Naukschen)
- Ozolu Parish (Lappier)
- Pāle Parish (Sepkull)
- Liepupe Parish (Pernigel)
- Plātera Parish (Moiseküll)
- Pociema Parish (Posendorf)
- Puiķeles Parish (Puikeln)
- Raiskums Parish (Raiskum)
- Rencēni Parish (Ranzen)
- Rozbeķu Parish (Schloß Rosenbeck)
- Staicele Parish (Koddiak)
- Rūjienas Parish (Rujen-Großhof)
- Sēļi Parish (Sehlen)
- Skaņkalne Parish (Kolberg)
- Stalbe Parish (Stolben)
- Stienes-Duntes Parish (Ulpisch-Ruthern)
- Susikas Parish (Sussikas)
- Svejciema Parish (Neu-Salis)
- Ternejas Parish (Rujen-Torney)
- Umurga Parish (Ubbenorm-Saarum)
- Aloja Parish (Pürkeln)
- Unguru pagasts (Orellen)
- Vaidava Parish (Waidau)
- Vainižu pagasts (Wainsel)
- Valmiera Parish (Wolmarshof)
- Mazsalaca Parish (Schloß Salisburg)
- Vecate Parish (Alt-Ottenhof)
- Vecsalacas Parish (Alt-Salis)
- Vilzēnu pagasts (Wilsenhof)
- Viļķene Parish (Wilkenhof)

Towns

- Limbaži (Lemsal)
- Valmiera (Wolmar)
