= Rūjiena Municipality =

Municipality of Latvia

Coordinates: 57°53′N 25°20′E

Rūjiena Municipality Rūjienas novads
- Municipality
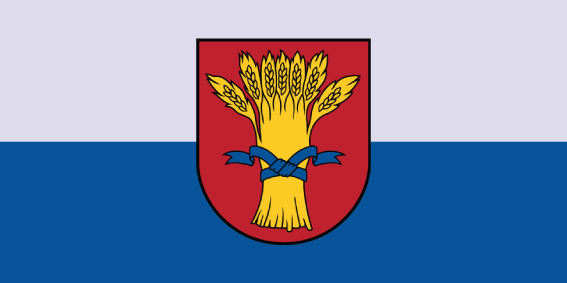
- Flag Coat of arms

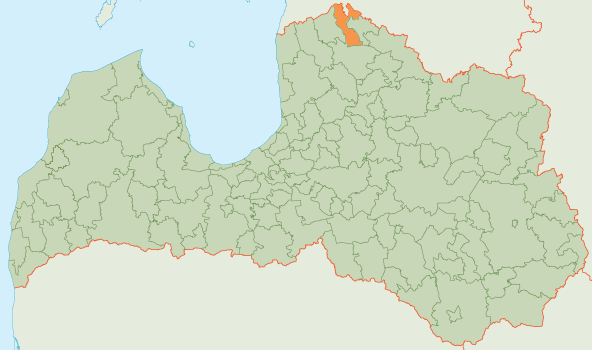
- Country: Latvia
- Formed: 2009
- Centre: Rūjiena

Government
  - Council Chair: Guntis Gladkins (Vidzeme Party)

Area
  - Total: 352.76 km^{2} (136.20 sq mi)
  - Land: 340.96 km^{2} (131.65 sq mi)
  - Water: 11.8 km^{2} (4.6 sq mi)

Population (2021)
  - Total: 4,817
  - Density: 14.13/km^{2} (36.59/sq mi)
- Website: www.rujiena.lv

Rūjiena Municipality (Latvian: Rūjienas novads) is a former municipality in Vidzeme, Latvia. The municipality was formed in 2009 by merging Rūjiena town, Ipiķi parish, Jeri parish, Lode parish and Vilpulka parish, the administrative centre being Rūjiena. The population in 2020 was 4,824.

On 1 July 2021, Rūjiena Municipality ceased to exist and its territory was merged into Valmiera Municipality.

== See also ==
- Administrative divisions of Latvia (2009–2021)
