= Burtnieki Municipality =

Former municipality of Latvia

Coordinates: 56°47′N 23°04′E

Burtnieki Municipality Burtnieku novads
- Former municipality
- Flag Coat of arms

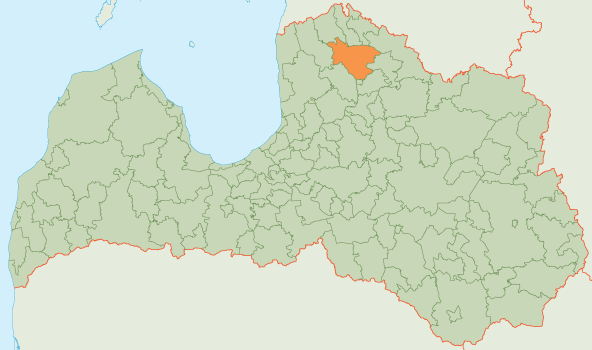
- Country: Latvia
- Formed: 2006
- Dissolved: 2021
- Centre: Burtnieki

Government
  - Chairman (last): Edvīns Straume (V)

Area
  - Total: 702.62 km^{2} (271.28 sq mi)
  - Land: 652.19 km^{2} (251.81 sq mi)
  - Water: 50.43 km^{2} (19.47 sq mi)

Population (2021)
  - Total: 7,410
  - Density: 11.4/km^{2} (29.4/sq mi)
- Website: www.burtniekunovads.lv

Burtnieki Municipality (Latvian: Burtnieku novads) was a municipality in Vidzeme, Latvia. The administrative centre was Burtnieki. The municipality was formed in 2006 by merging Vecate Parish and Matīši Parish of Valmiera district. In 2009 it absorbed Burtnieki Parish, Ēvele Parish, Rencēni Parish and Valmiera Parish after the dissolution of districts.

On 1 July 2021, Burtnieki Municipality ceased to exist and its territory was merged into Valmiera Municipality.

== See also ==
- Administrative divisions of Latvia (2009)
