= Mazsalaca Municipality =

Former municipality of Latvia

Coordinates: 57°52′N 25°03′E

Mazsalaca Municipality Mazsalacas novads
- Former municipality
- Coat of arms

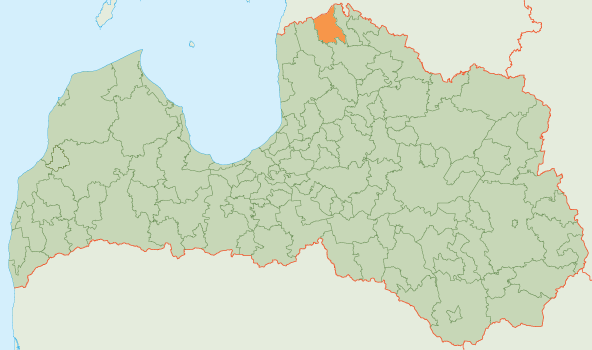
- Country: Latvia
- Formed: 1 July 2009
- Dissolved: 1 July 2021
- Centre: Mazsalaca

Government
  - Council Chair (last): Harijs Rokpelnis (For Mazsalaca Municipality)

Area
  - Total: 417.44 km^{2} (161.17 sq mi)
  - Land: 407.88 km^{2} (157.48 sq mi)
  - Water: 9.56 km^{2} (3.69 sq mi)

Population (2021)
  - Total: 2,867
  - Density: 7.029/km^{2} (18.21/sq mi)
- Website: www.mazsalaca.lv

Mazsalaca Municipality (Latvian: Mazsalacas novads) was a municipality in Vidzeme, Latvia. The administrative centre was Mazsalaca.

The municipality was formed in 2009 by merging Ramata parish, Sēļi parish, Skaņkalne parish and Mazsalaca town with its rural territory (countryside territory) after the dissolution of Valmiera district. In 2010 Mazsalaca parish was created from the rural territory of Mazsalaca town.

On 1 July 2021, Mazsalaca Municipality ceased to exist and its territory was merged into Valmiera Municipality.

== See also ==
- Administrative divisions of Latvia
- 2009 Latvian administrative reform
