= Kocēni Municipality =

Municipality of Latvia

Coordinates: 57°31′13″N 25°20′17″E

Kocēni Municipality Kocēnu novads
- Municipality
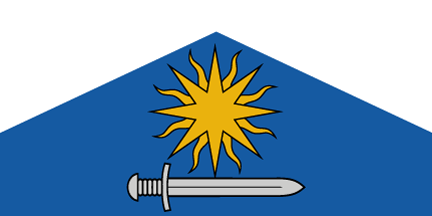
- Flag Coat of arms

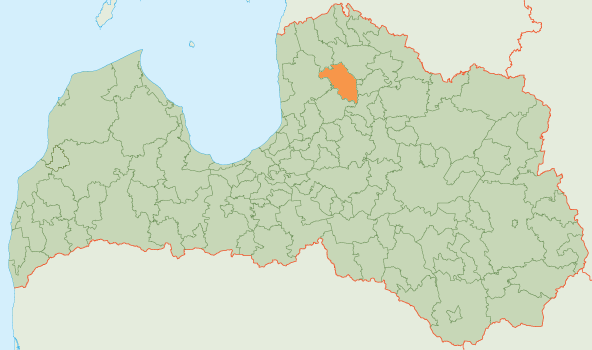
- Country: Latvia
- Formed: 2009
- Dissolved: 2021
- Centre: Kocēni

Government
  - Chairman: Jānis Olmanis (NA)

Area
  - Total: 498.87 km^{2} (192.61 sq mi)
  - Land: 487.58 km^{2} (188.26 sq mi)
  - Water: 11.29 km^{2} (4.36 sq mi)

Population (2021)
  - Total: 5,776
  - Density: 11.85/km^{2} (30.68/sq mi)
- Website: www.kocenunovads.lv

Kocēni Municipality (Latvian: Kocēnu novads) is a former municipality in Vidzeme, Latvia. The municipality was formed in 2009 by merging Bērzaine Parish, Dikļi Parish, Kocēni Parish, Vaidava Parish and Zilākalns Parish; the administrative centre being Kocēni. Until 28 January 2010 the name of municipality was Valmiera Municipality (Valmieras novads).

On 1 July 2021, Kocēni Municipality ceased to exist and its territory was merged into Valmiera Municipality.

== See also ==
- Administrative divisions of Latvia (2009)
