= Rujiena Airfield =

Rujiena Airfield Rūjiena Aerodromo
- IATA: none; ICAO: none

Summary
- Airport type: Defunct
- Owner: Valmiera Municipality
- Operator: Latvian Aero Club Rūjiena Branch
- Location: Rūjiena, Valmiera Municipality
- Opened: 1938
- Coordinates: 57°53′07″N 25°20′02″E

Map
- Location of Rujiena Airfield shown within Latvia

Rujiena Airfield, also known as Rujen Airfield, was an airfield located in Rūjiena, Valmiera Municipality, in the Vidzeme region of Latvia. It was built in 1938 following the need for an airfield in the town, and primarily served sports flying activities. The airfield was not used by the Soviet Air Forces or Luftwaffe during World War II.

== History ==
According to The Voice of Rujien in April 1932, the municipal authorities of Rūjiena searched and selected a site by releasing the land and small taxes required from former property owners. Before, the property consisted of barns and tobacco drying sheds. The town council arranged with Junkers to establish the aerodrome, which agreed to pay the construction with the cost of 90,000 lats. Additionally, the town had to remove a small merchant trading stall to clear it and expand the market square. Wooden fences were installed for the boundary of the airfield. On "31" April, 1932, it was inaugurated on a route between Rūjiena and Mazsalaca. However, this mention of an aerodrome was actually part of an April Fool's hoax by the newspaper, intended at deceiving the community. It also celebrated its 150th issue, and included other jokes that did not actually happen within the town. The airfield did not formally exist until the establishment of one in 1938.

=== Construction ===
On 2 April, 1935, the Rūjiena Branch of the Latvian Aero Club was established and was officially approved on 15 April of that year. Afterwards, members were sent to the Jelgava Gliding School to train in gliding construction. Shortly afterwards, the glider "Vanags No. 16" was built locally in the town. In 1937, the branch obtained its first aerodrome at Ērgli in Terneja parish. On 1 July, 1938, the Rūjiena city council donated 100 lats to the Rujiena branch of the Latvian Aero Club to complete the aerodrome.

By 26 July, the aero club had collected about 704.50 lats form monetary donations. The Rūjiena Mutual Credit Society had donated 50, Rūjiena Consumer Cooperative "Konzums" donated 50, Koknese Savings and Loan Society donated 50, Rūjiena Savings and Loan Society donated 25, Terneja Parish Fire Insurance Society donated 25, Rūjiena Consumer Cooperative “Agronoms” donated 20, Krimūni Mutual Fire Insurance Society donated 20, Terneja Parish Council donated 10, and J. Kalve donated 5 lats. These costs covered a fee of 130 lats waived by surveyor K. Duņēns, who measured the aerodrome land and created site plans. 168.50 lats were also paid for processing and preparing the aerodrome ground undertaken by the Rūjiena Dairy Cooperative. Additionally, joint-stock company Latvijas Centrālais Sēklu Eksports donated 400 kg of grass seed to sow grass on the landing ground, which prevented the spread of dust and formation of mud, and 300 meters of fabric were also donated by Latvijas Kokvilna for pilot uniforms.

=== Opening ===
On 29 July, Rujiena Airfield was officially opened, following an urge to construct an airfield in the small town of Rūjiena. Four Latvian Aizsargi aircraft arrived from Riga, piloted by officers including W. Dimse. Among the pilots was also a Rūjiena native, warmly welcomed along with other flyers. The event was attended by town officials, police representatives, and Aero Club members. An aircraft of the Latvian Aero Club aircraft later arrived, known as "The Blue Bird." Following the opening, an aviation festival was held with an inspection of aircraft, formal parade, and religious parade. The aircraft on display included KOD-24, KOD-32, KOD-31, KOD-34, the Blue Bird, and gliders from the Aero Club division. The parade was reviewed by Captain R. Precītis, who gave a speech encouraging Latvian youth to pursue aviation.

=== Operations ===
Following opening, Rujiena Arfield would be used for sports flying activities such as cross-country aviation, and navigation and touring flights. After the festival, Rujiena Airfield was used by the Aizsargi Aviacija for a training session in late July, 1938. On 2 October, 1938, Rujiena Airfield was the final refuelling stop during the national Flight Around Latvia competition. The aviators landed at the airfield, refuelled, and continued on towards Matīši Parish. On 7 October, 1938, a large aviation festival was held at Rujiena Airfield. During the event, 11 aircraft landed at the airfield during a nationwide flight tour. The event drew large crowds, and the Rūjiena city mayor, police chief, chairman of the Latvian Aero Club Rūjiena branch, and other public and civic representatives had attended the event. On 10 January, 1939, the Aero Club began plans for the construction of hangars at the airfield, with funding supported by the local community. On 2 July, 1939, the Festival of Air Conquerors was held at the airfield. The event included a promotion ceremony, where a captain was promoted, and also a tour of a newly built hangar in the airfield, which had cost 2800 lats to complete. A group of young pilots participated in the event by demonstrating various aerial displays. The event was attended by aviation enthusiasts.

During World War II, neither did the Soviet Air Forces or Luftwaffe occupy Rujiena Airfield. It had a natural surface landing ground measuring approximately 500 x 250 meters. On 2 April, 1940, the Rūjiena Branch of the Latvian Aero Club celebrated its 5th anniversary. It was listed as a landeplatz (landing ground), and was shown as an unoccupied operational airfield in a 15 June 1941 reconnaissance photograph.

After the war, Rujiena Airfield resumed operations as a civilian airfield, and a route between Rūjiena and Riga was inaugurated by 1948. The route was popular among its residents, and it gained public support. In June 1948, a decision was made to further develop the airfield, and the route was temporarily suspended. Farmers from surrounding parishes on horse teams and foot took part in construction work along with the Rūjiena-Terneja Machine-Tractor Station. Extensive earthworks and land-reclamation was carried out.
