= Virkeni Manor =

Manor in Latvia

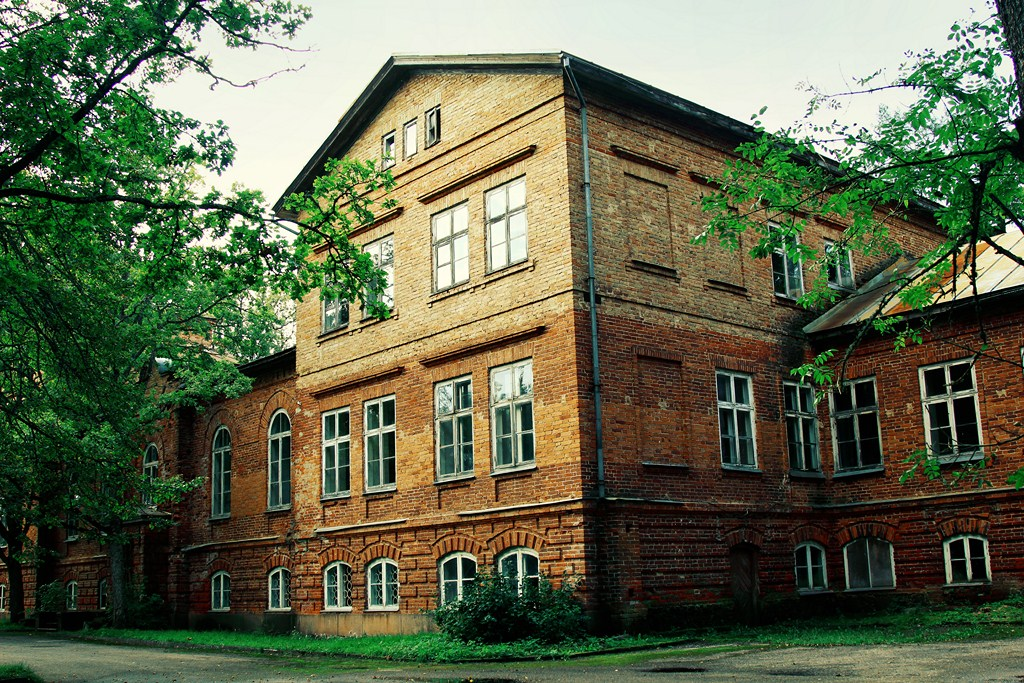

- Location of the Virkeni Manor

General information
- Location: Virkeni, Vilpulka Parish, Valmiera Municipality, Latvia
- Coordinates: 57°55′13″N 25°15′10″E
- Construction started: 1520

Virkeni Manor and the park are located in the village of Virkeni in the Vilpulka Parish of Valmiera Municipality in the Vidzeme region of Latvia, near the border of Estonia. It is located 5 km from Rujiena, 45 km from Valmiera, 150 km from Riga, as well as 75 km from Pärnu and 200 km from Tallinn.

Historical names are Wirken, Wirkken, Würken, Würcken, Wirkenhoff, and Würkenhoff.

== History ==
=== The 16th Century ===
In 1520, on the orders of Wolter von Plettenberg, the Livonian Order master, several land parcels were leased to Kuddelen, who merged them and created a manor.

The next owner of the manor was the von Dönhoff family – a well-known Baltic German family: the father, Gerard von Dönhoff, was the Governor of Tartu in 1598 and his sons, in turn Caspar von Dönhoff, a diplomat and a favourite of the Polish King Zigismund III Vases, was governor of Tartu (in today's Estonia) and Sieradza (in today's Poland) and Ernst Magnus von Dönhoff was the castellan of Parnu and Tartu.

=== The 17th Century ===
The First Half of the 17th Century – during the Swedish reign (Svenska Livland) from 1629 to 1721) the Manor belonged to the Engelhardt family. The first owner was a Swedish army cavalry lieutenant, the Vidzeme nobleman Michael von Engelhardt (who also owned the Endzele Manor). He received the manor as a gift from Swedish King Gustav II Adolf in gratitude for his faithful and long-time war service. Later the Manor was inherited by his son, the Baltic German landlord and major in the Swedish Army, Michael Johann von Engelhardt (1678-1730).

In 1690, the Manor was taken away based on a decision by Swedish King Karl XI, but soon afterwards was returned.

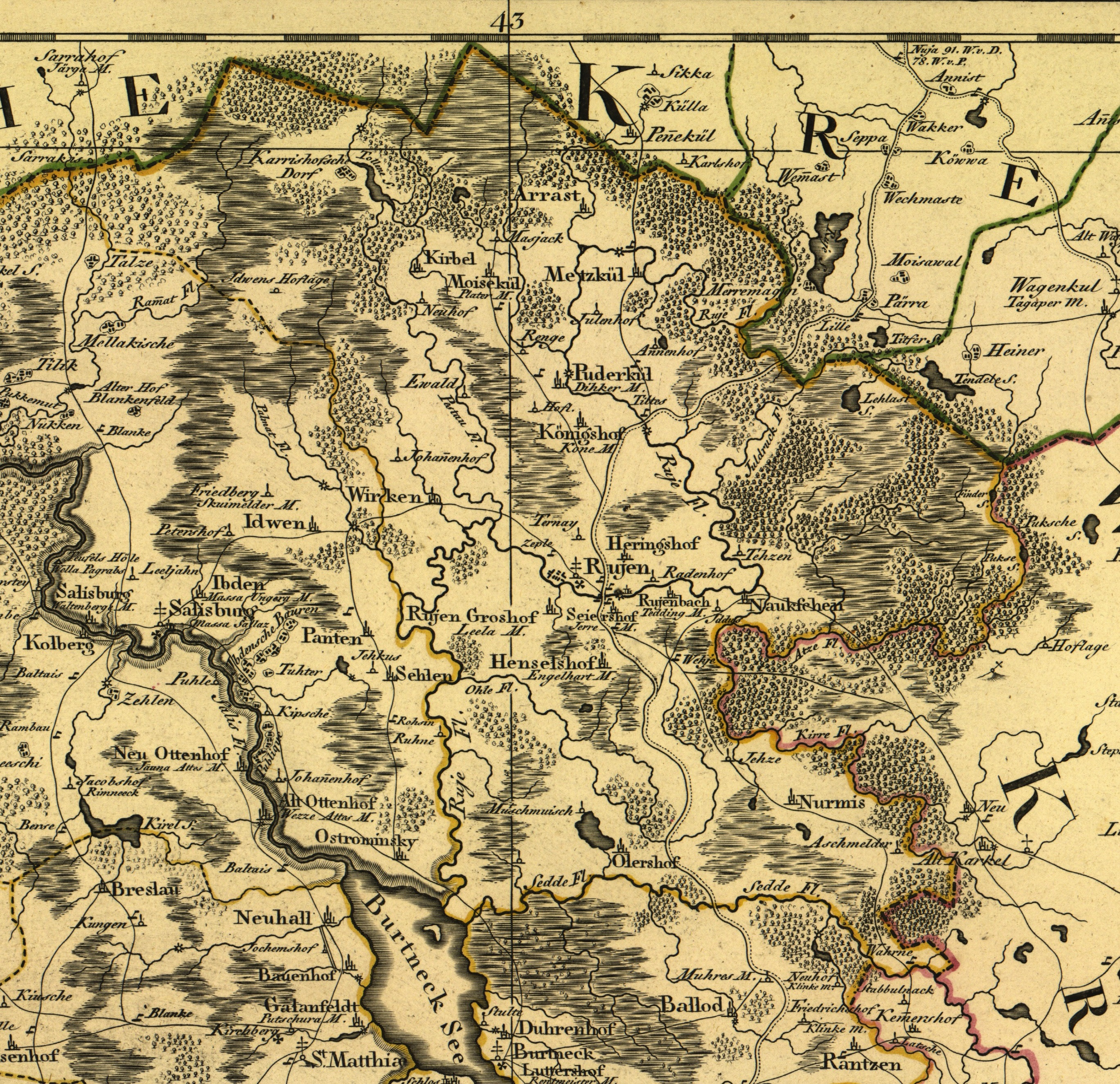
Rujiena municipality (1798)

=== The 18th Century ===
The 18th Century – The Virkeni Manor continued to be owned by the von Engelhardt family.

=== The 19th Century ===
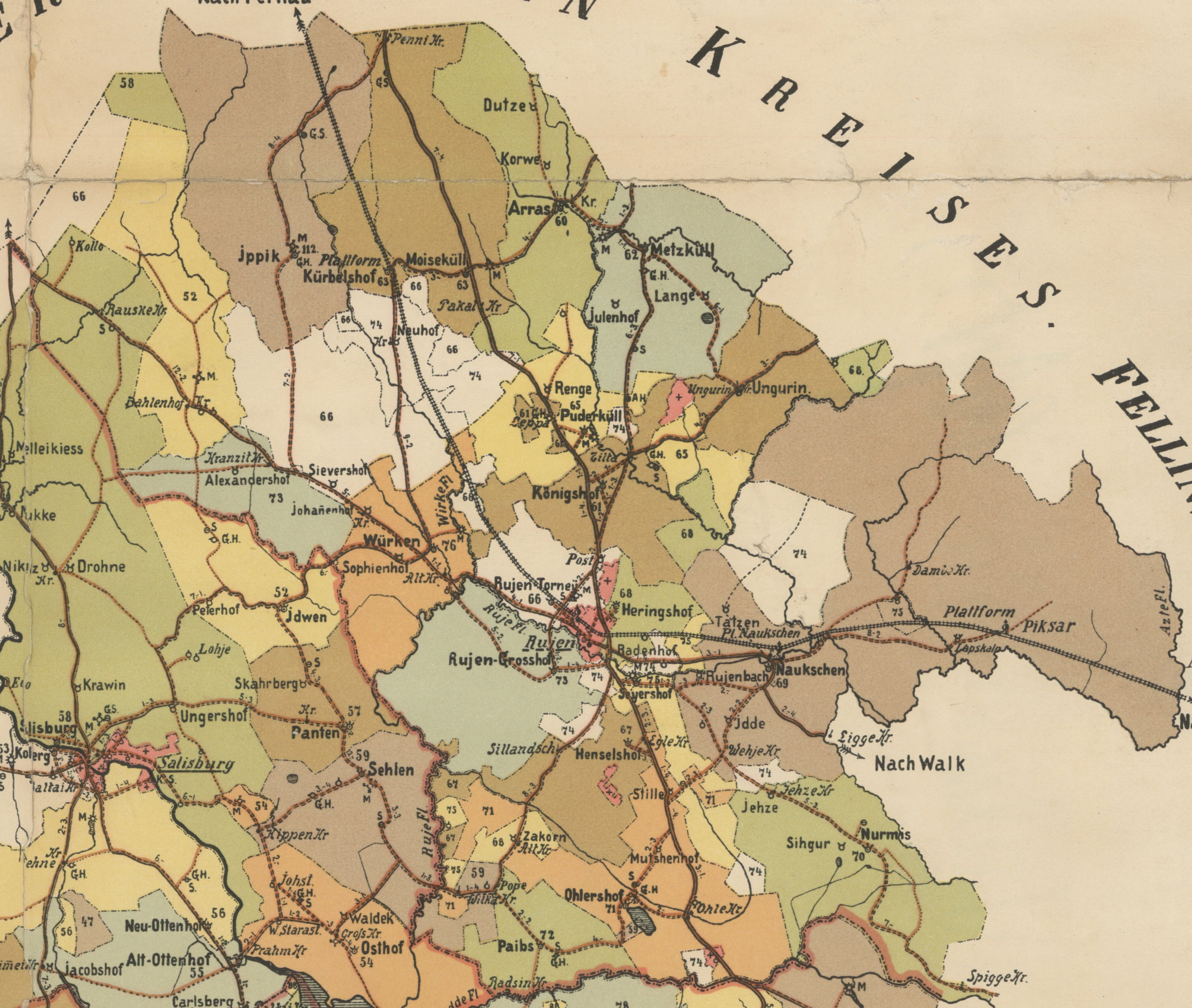
Ruhja kihelkonna mõisad (1903)

From 1820 the Manor was run by artillery lieutenant and assessor Anton Johan II von Engelhardt (1788-1874) and his wife Sophie Magdalena Helene von Numers (1787-1848).

Later, Virkeni Manor was inherited by Anton Johan's II son Baron Karl Gustav Georg von Engelhardt (1811-1887) who was married to Eveline Katherine von Engelhardt (1826-1853) in 1850.

In 1820, the Manor's territory was the residence of 324 inhabitants (154 men and 170 women), while in 1860, according to the Rujiene Church Convent's minutes, 249 inhabitants lived on the Virkeni Manor.

From 1859 to 1861, the Neo-Latvian movement's participant Jekabs Zvaigznite (1833-1867) worked as a tutor at the Virkeni Manor for Baron Karl Gustav Georg von Engelhardt's (1811-1887) sons Karl Anton von Engelhardt (1851-1923) and Hermann Gustav von Engelhardt (1853-1914). At the time that he worked at the Virkeni Manor, he was a colleague of Juris Alunans, publishing the work „Sēta, Daba, Pasaule” (The Farmstead, Nature and the World) (1860). Immediately afterwards (in 1862) he became a member of the editorial staff at the „Pēterburgas Avīzes” (The Peterburg Newspaper).

Karl Anton von Engelhardt began construction of a new Castle in the early 1890s, but his brother Hermann Gustav von Engelhardt left to study art in Germany and later became a painter.

The last owner of the Virkeni Manor, Karl Anton von Engelhardt, who was connected with Russia's emperor Aleksander II Romanov, lived abroad (Germany and Austria) from 1895 and rented the manor to his godson, the German cultivator Gustav Berkmann (1860-1931) for 300 roubles a year. From 1895 to 1910 Berkmann rented out the second floor of the Manor to Graf Treimanis from St. Petersburg.

=== The 20th Century ===
In 1920, the 704 ha large Virkeni Manor was taken over by the Latvian state and included in the State's Land Bank.

On 19 March 1921 the Virkeni Manor center was allocated to the Rujiena Agriculture Association to establish the Rujiena Agriculture school (from the end of the 1920s the Rujiena Agriculture and Home Economics School).

On 16 October 1936 as a result of the liquidation of the Agriculture Association, the school became the property of the Agriculture Chamber.

After that the Virkeni Manor has always housed a professional education institutions (Rujiena Technical School No. 4 (1955-1963), Rujiena City Professional Technical School No. 10 (1963-1973), Rujiena Technical School No. 5 (1973-1984), the 68th Professional Technical High School (1984-1988), Virkeni Agriculture School (1988-1999), Rujiena Professional Gymnasium (1999-2006)).

== Gallery ==
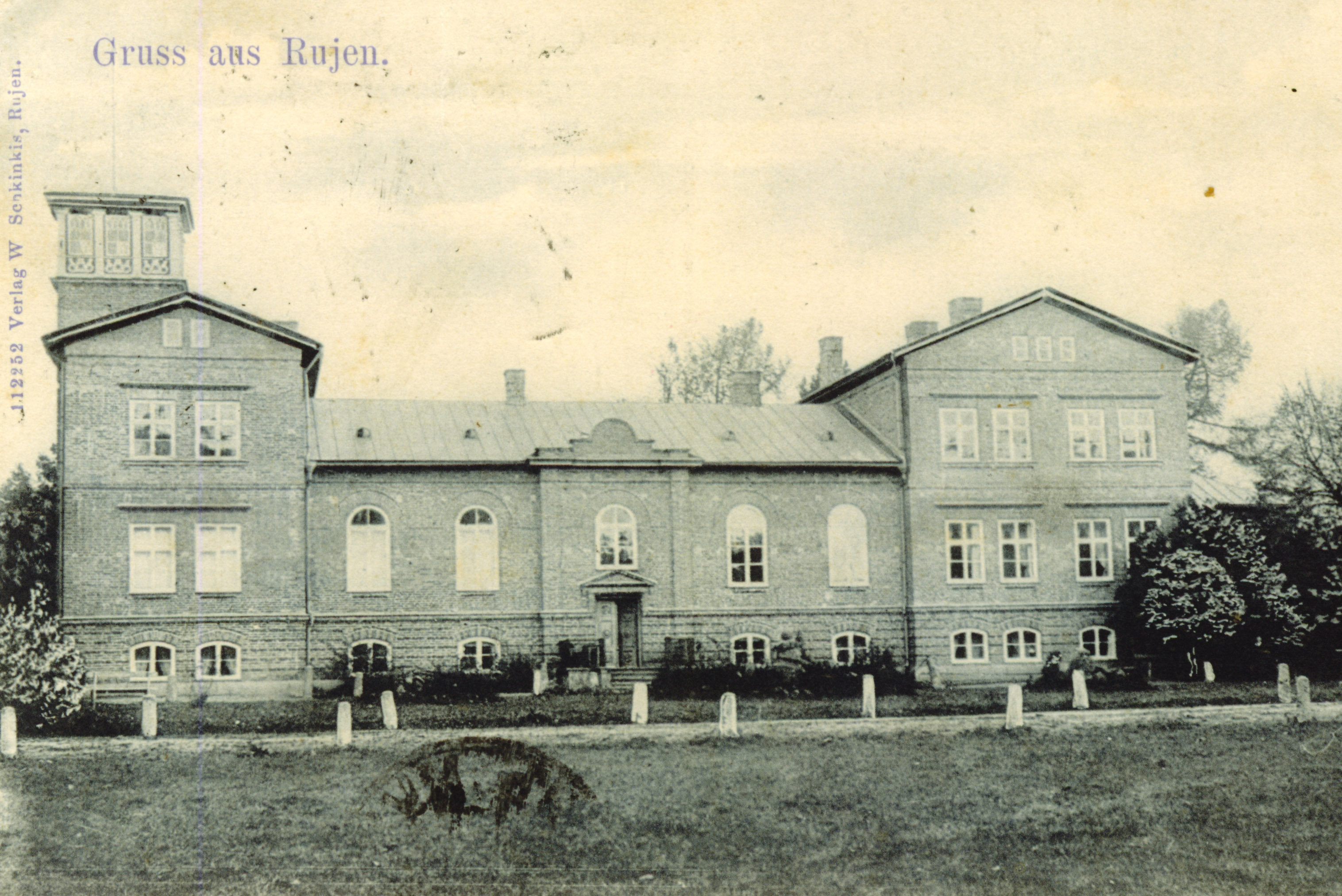
Virkeni Manor Lord's House (Archives of Valmiera Museum)

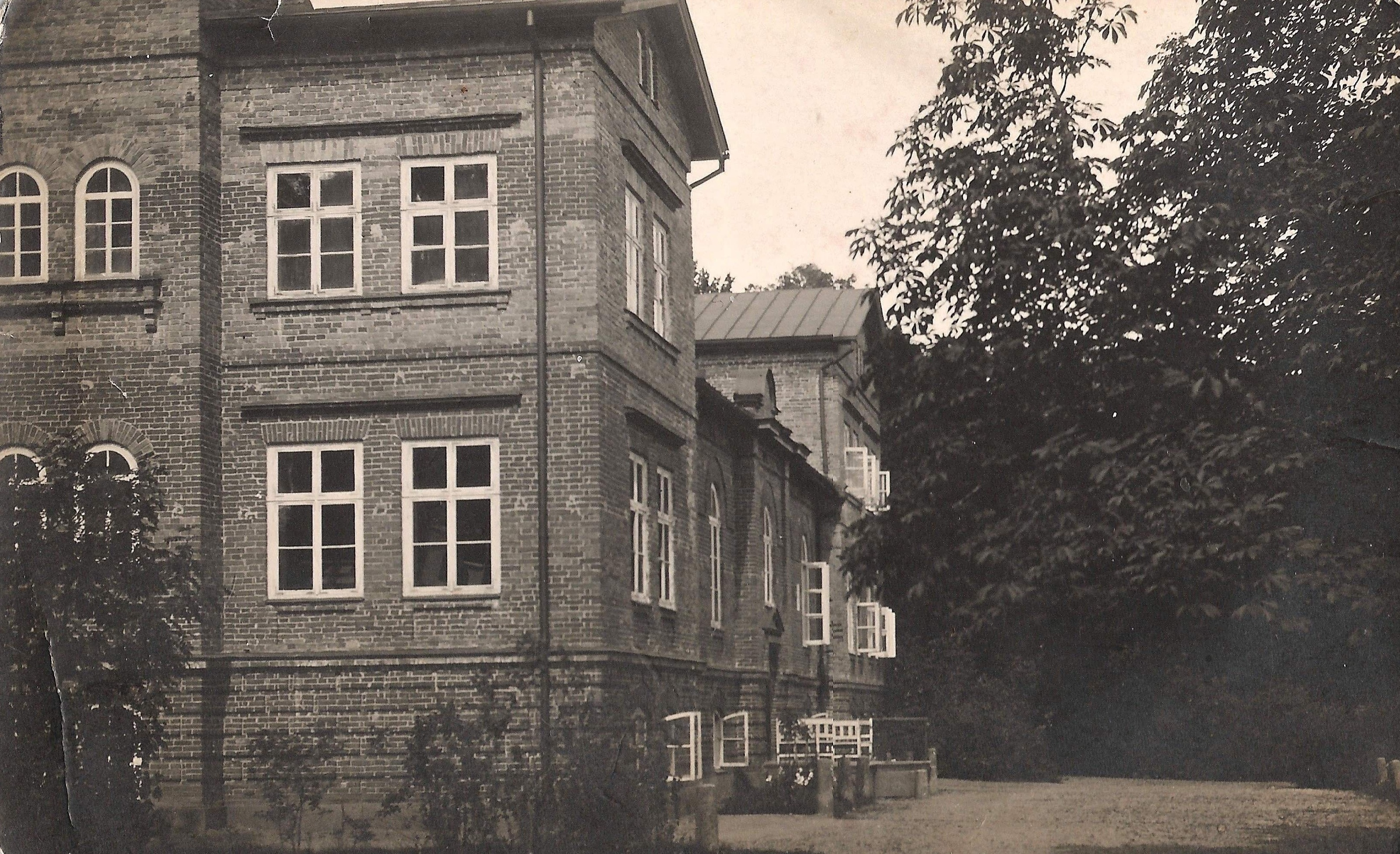
Virkeni Manor Lord's House (Archives of Valmiera Museum)

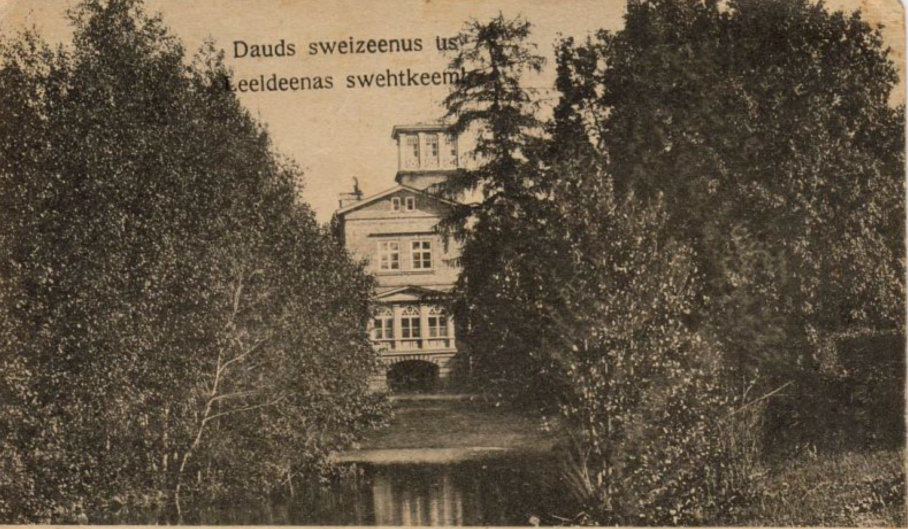
Virkeni Manor Lord's House (Archives of the National Library of Latvia)

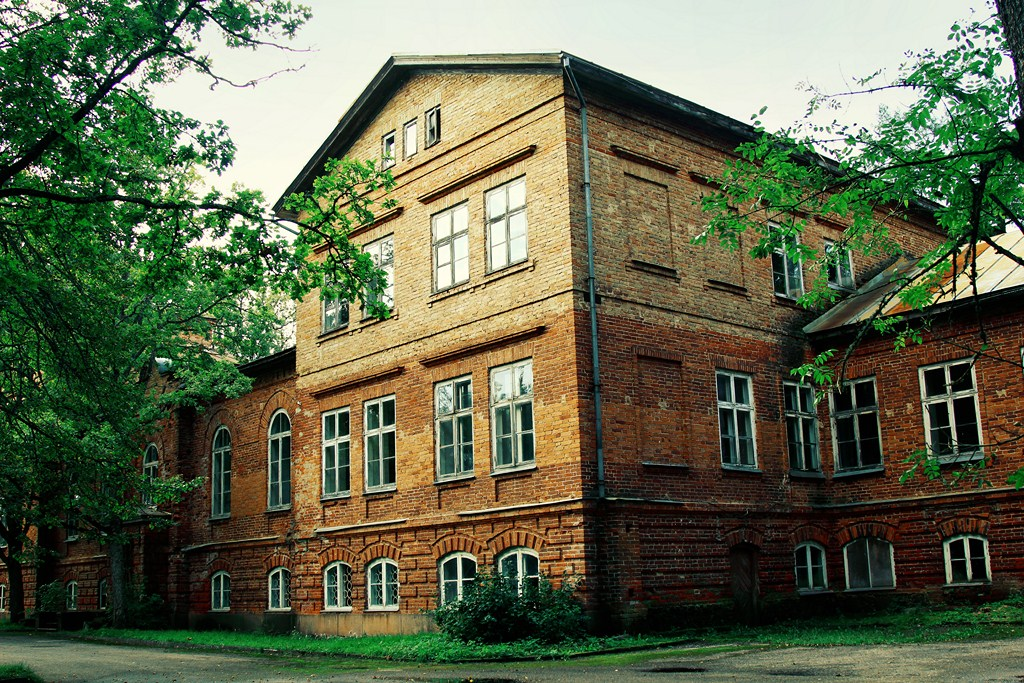
Virkeni Manor Lord's House

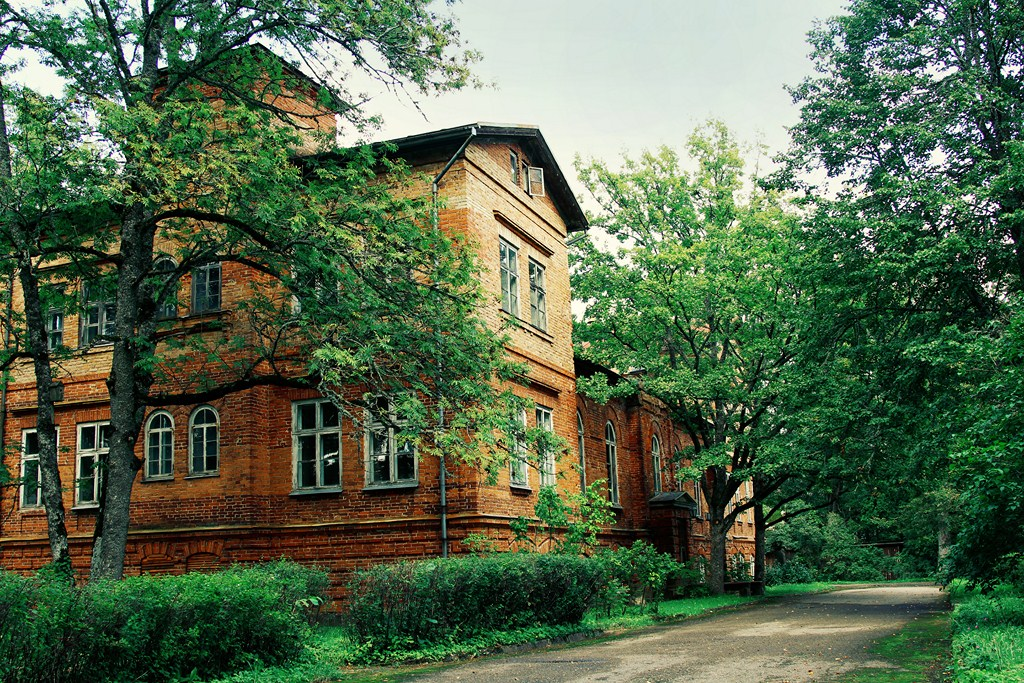
Virkeni Manor Lord's House

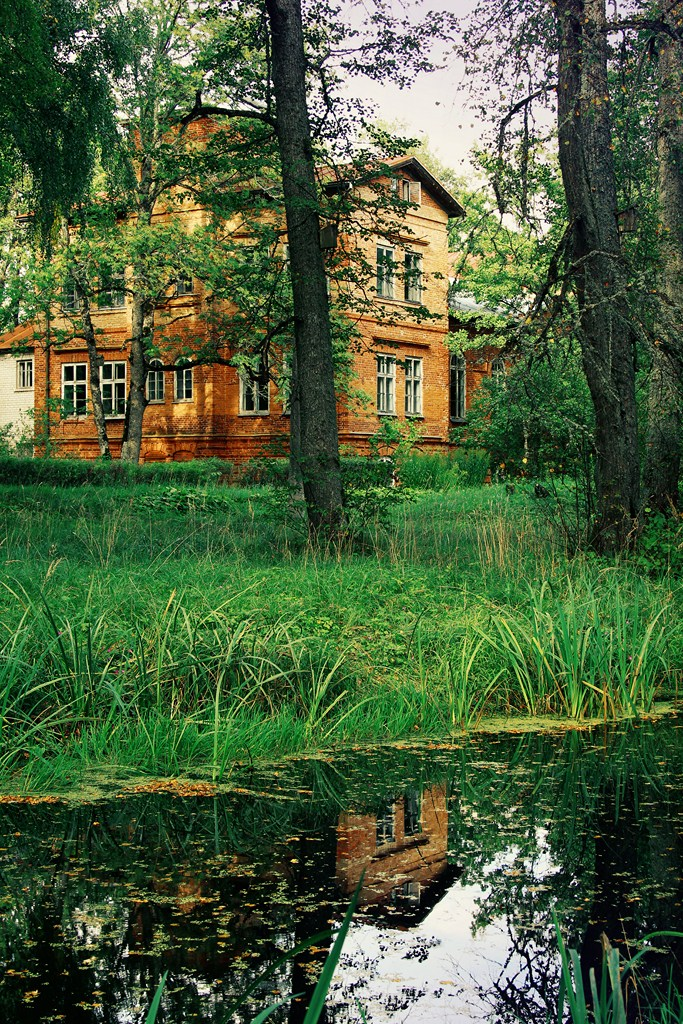
Virkeni Manor Lord's House

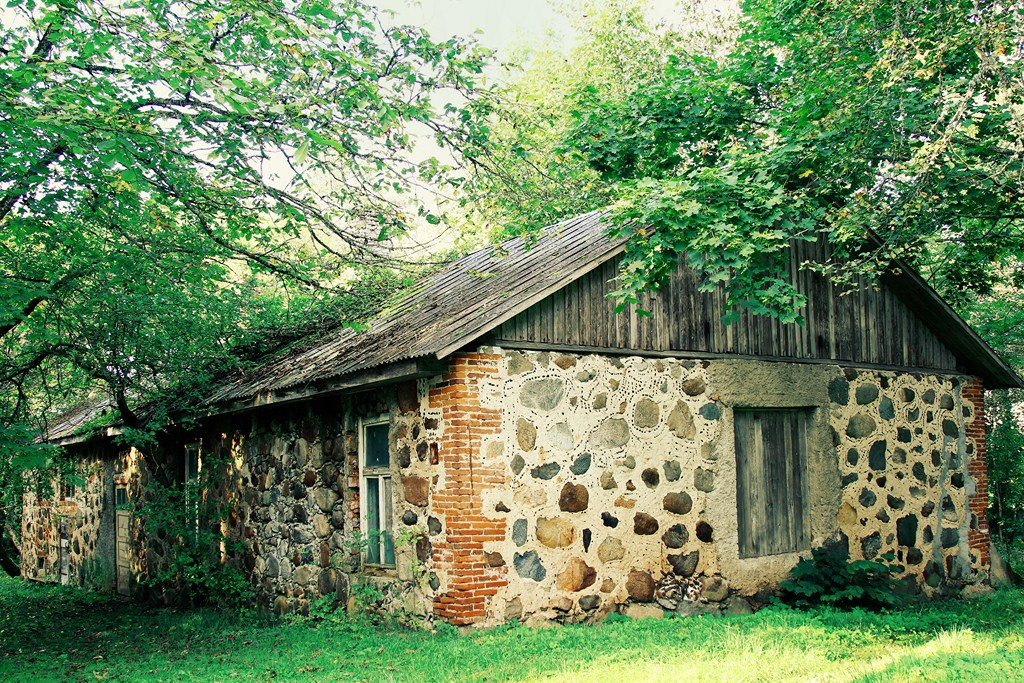
Virkeni manor Brewery

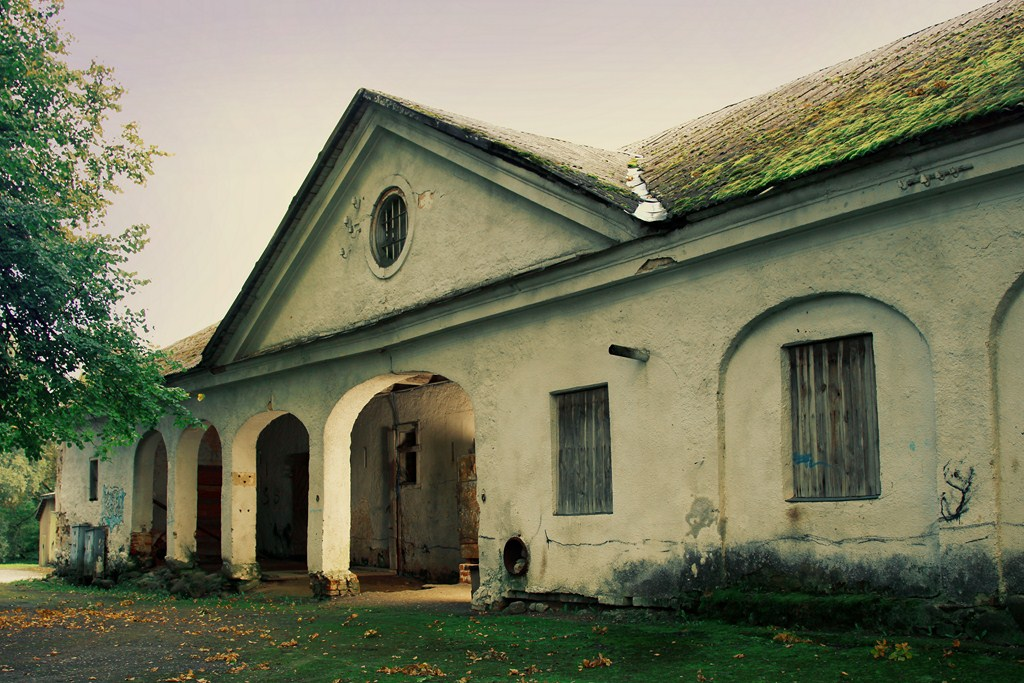
Virkeni manor Granary

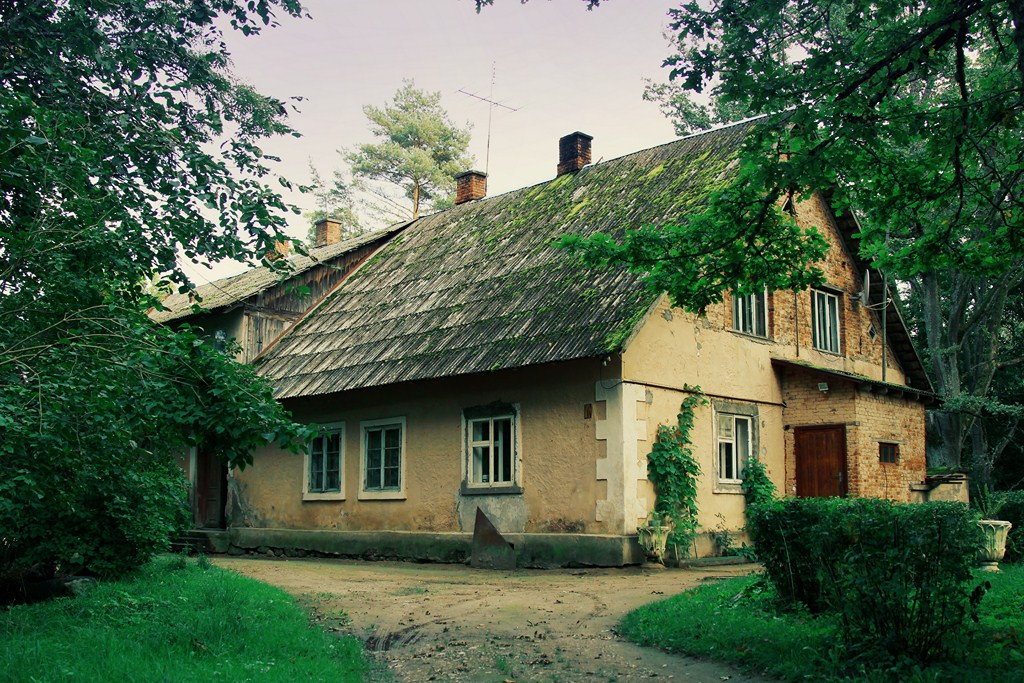
Virkeni manor Servants House

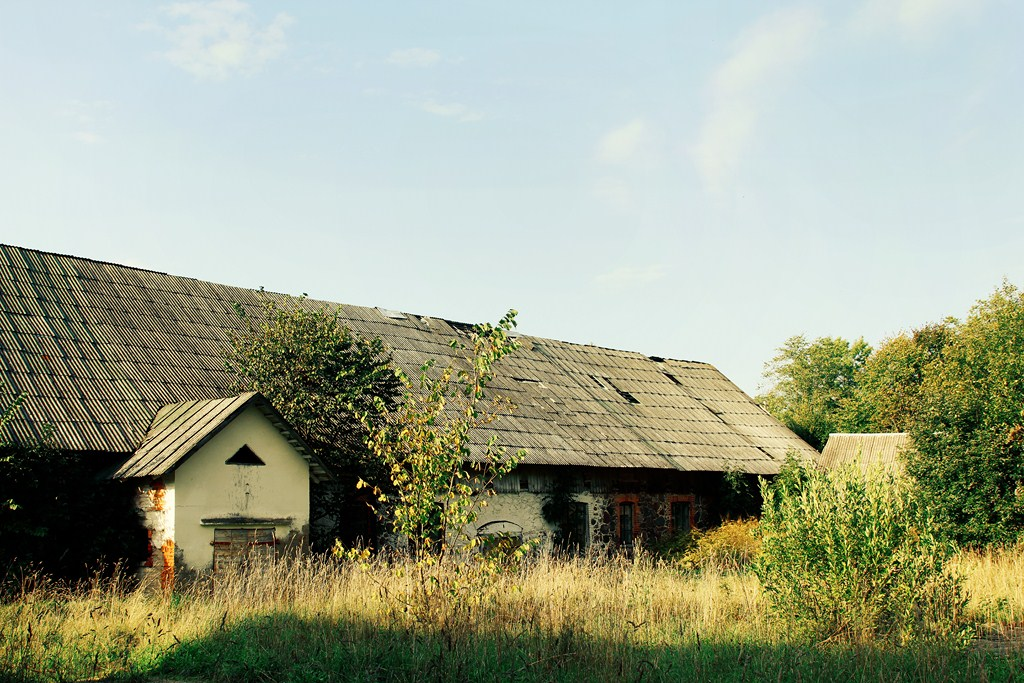
Virkeni manor Big Cattle-Shed

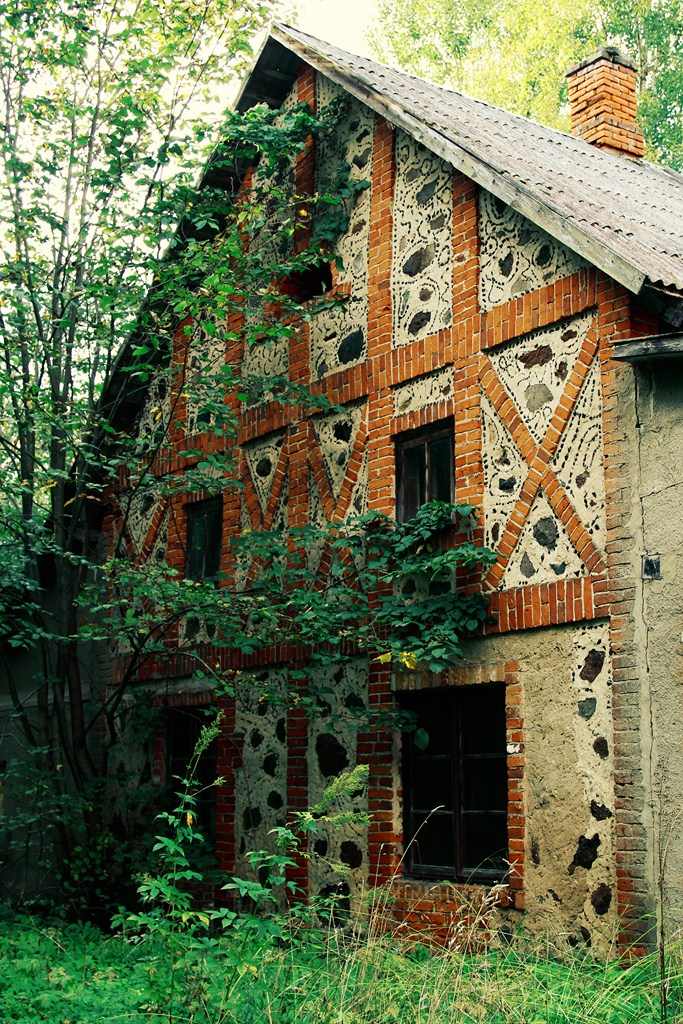
Virkeni manor Smithy

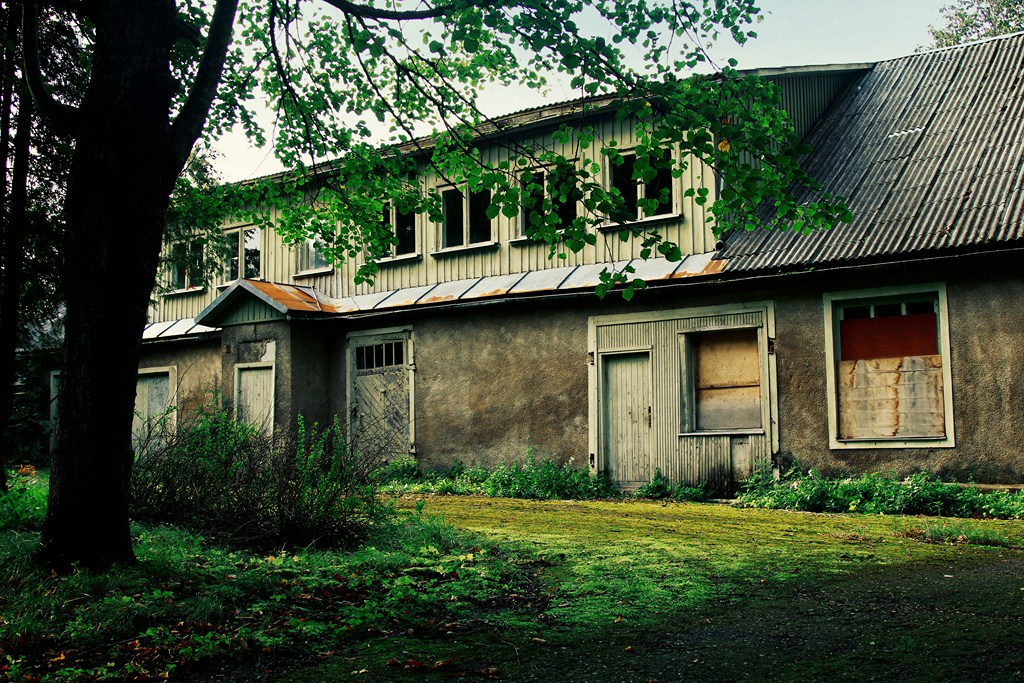
Outbuilding

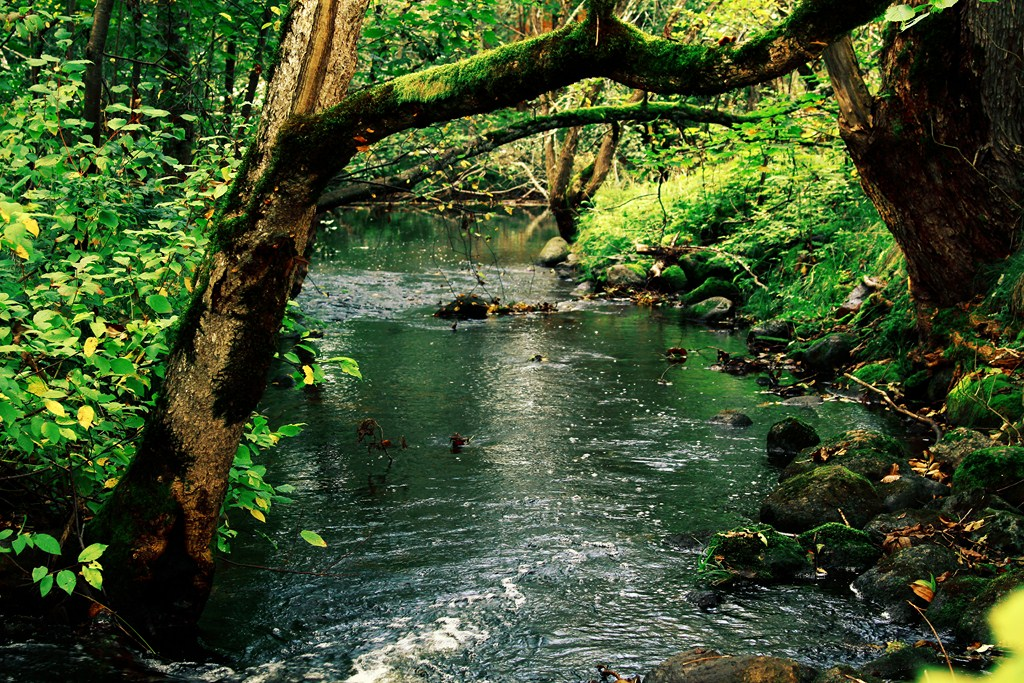
Virkeni manor rivulet "Virkite"
