= Evalds Silins =

Latvian composer, teacher and conductor (1919 – 2015)

Evalds Silins (Latvian: Ēvalds Siliņš; March 10, 1919 – 2015) was a Latvian composer, teacher and conductor.

Evalds Silins was born on March 10, 1919, in Ēvele Parish, Valka, Latvia.

From 1932 to 1938, he studied at the Priekule Agricultural Gymnasium; at the same time, he also studied piano at the People's Conservatory of Cesis. In 1962, Evalds Silins graduated with honors from the conducting department of the Latvian State Conservatory named after Jāzeps Vītols and studied for two years at the composition department with Lūcija Garūta. For almost 50 years (from 1948 to 1996), Evalds Silins worked as a music teacher at Rūjiena Secondary school. Rūjiena awarded him the title of Honorary Citizen. There is also a monument created by Aivars Gulbis dedicated to Evalds Silins in Rūjiena.

Evalds Silins also worked as a conductor outside of school. For more than 30 years, he led a mixed choir at Rūjiena House of Culture, the women's choir “Straume”, the mixed choir “Naukšēni”, various vocal ensembles and a pop orchestra. In 1965, he became the chief conductor of the Valmiera region choirs.

Evalds Silins's body rests in the Bērtuļa cemetery.

== Works ==
Both independently and together with other authors, Evalds Silins has created about 80 methodological works in the field of music education, including 12 official textbooks. He is the author of about 100 children's songs.

== Awards ==
- Certificate of Appreciation from the Cabinet of Ministers of Latvia (1995)
- Golden honorary badge of the Order of the Three Stars (1996)
