= Bērzaine Parish =

Parish in Valmiera Municipality, Latvia

- parish of Latvia
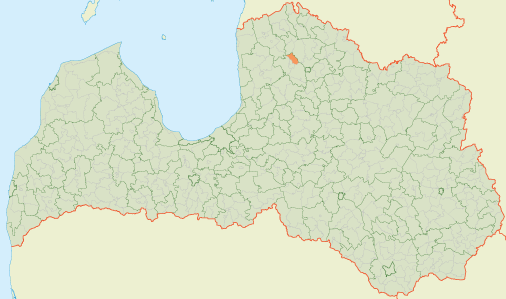
- Coordinates: 57°37′30″N 25°12′16″E
- Country: Latvia

Population (1 January 2026)
  - Total: 519

Bērzaine parish (Latvian: Bērzaines pagasts) is an administrative unit of Valmiera Municipality in the Vidzeme region of Latvia. The administrative center is Bērzaine village.

Previously, the parish was a part of Valmiera county, Valmiera district and Kocēni Municipality.

== Villages and settlements of Bērzaine parish ==
- Bērzaine
- Ludzēni
- Vākšēni
- Jaunburtnieku skola
