= Valmiera Parish =

Parish in Valmiera Municipality, Latvia

- parish of Latvia
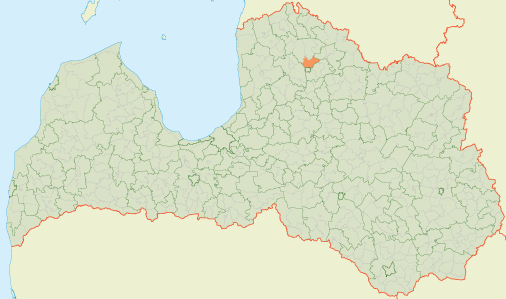
- 57°35′36″N 25°27′17″E
- Country: Latvia

Area
  - Total: 101.32 km^{2} (39.12 sq mi)
  - Land: 99.45 km^{2} (38.40 sq mi)
  - Water: 1.87 km^{2} (0.72 sq mi)

Population (1 January 2025)
  - Total: 3,401
  - Density: 34.20/km^{2} (88.57/sq mi)

Valmiera Parish (Latvian: Valmieras pagasts) is an administrative unit of Valmiera Municipality in the Vidzeme region of Latvia. The administrative center is the village of Valmiermuiža.

Until 1949, it was a part of Valmiera county, from 1949 to 2009 - Valmiera district and from 2009 to 2021 - Burtnieki Municipality.
