= Valmiera Municipality =

Municipality of Latvia

Valmiera Municipality Valmieras novads
- Municipality
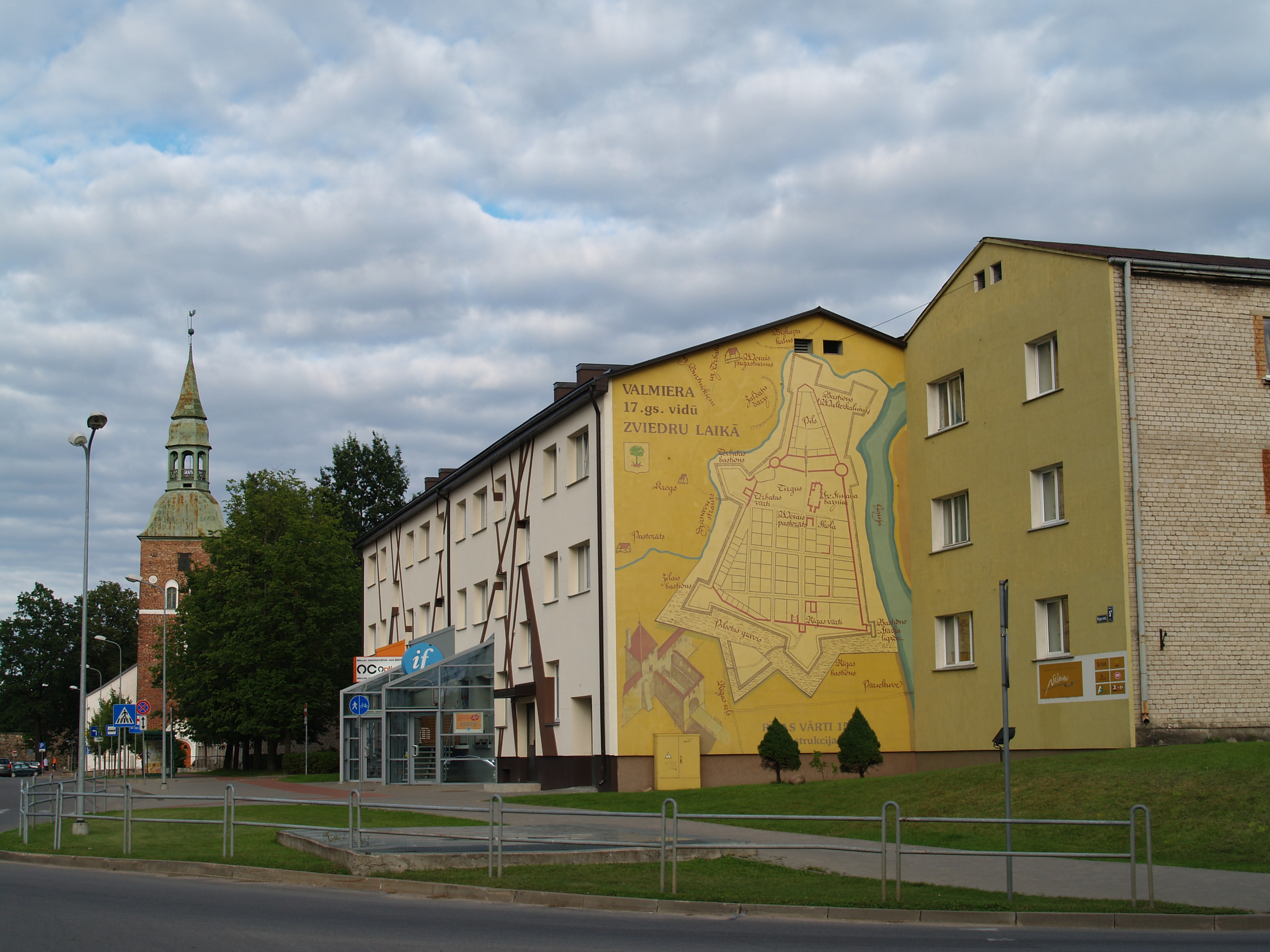
- Valmiera town centre with St. Simon's Church in the background

- Flag Coat of arms

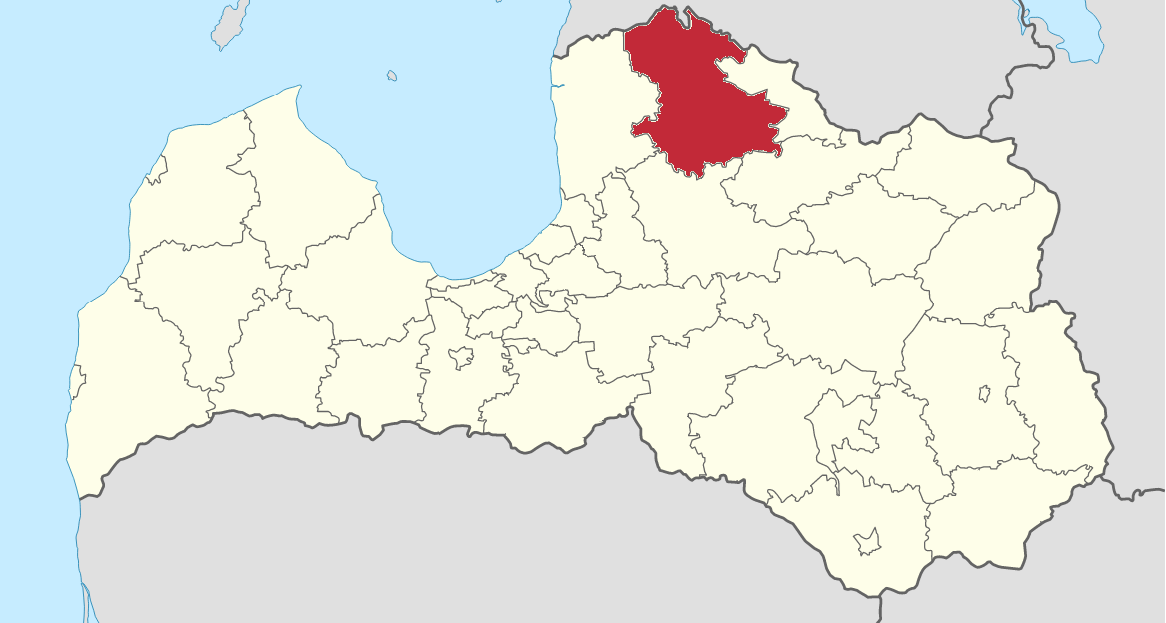
- Location of Valmiera Municipality in Latvia

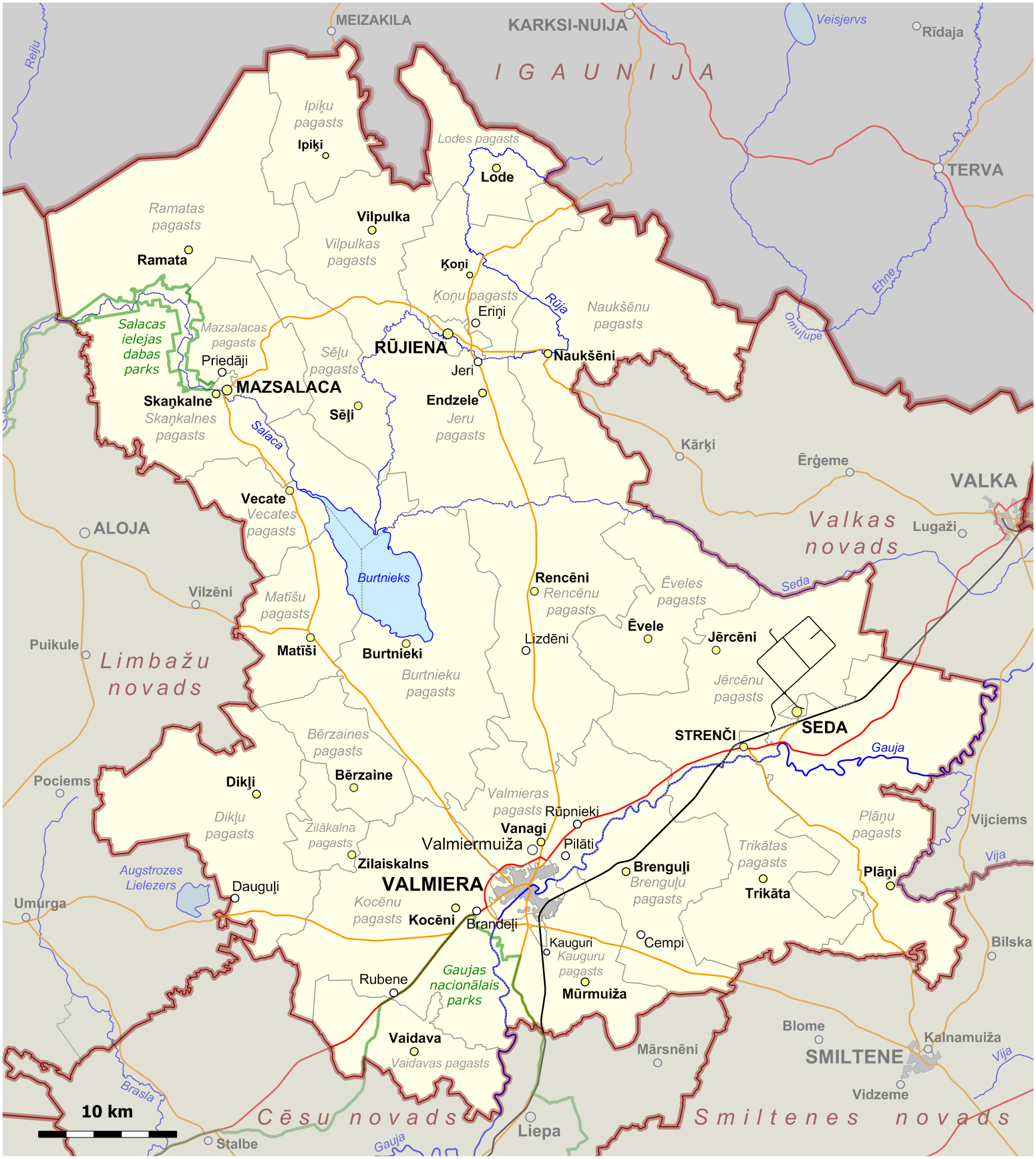
- Coordinates: 57.55°N 25.45°E
- Country: Latvia
- Established: 1 July 2021
- Seat: Valmiera

Government
  - Council Chair: Jānis Baiks (VV)

Area
  - Total: 2,948 km^{2} (1,138 sq mi)

Population
  - Estimate (1 January 2021): 51,370
  - Seat: 22,971
- Time zone: UTC+2 (EET)
  - Summer (DST): UTC+3 (EEST)
- Website: valmierasnovads.lv

Valmiera Municipality (Latvian: Valmieras novads) is one of the 35 municipalities established in Latvia in 2021, located approximately 100 kilometres (62 mi) northeast of the national capital Riga. Its first elected municipal council took office on 1 July 2021. Its seat is the city of Valmiera.

== Geography ==
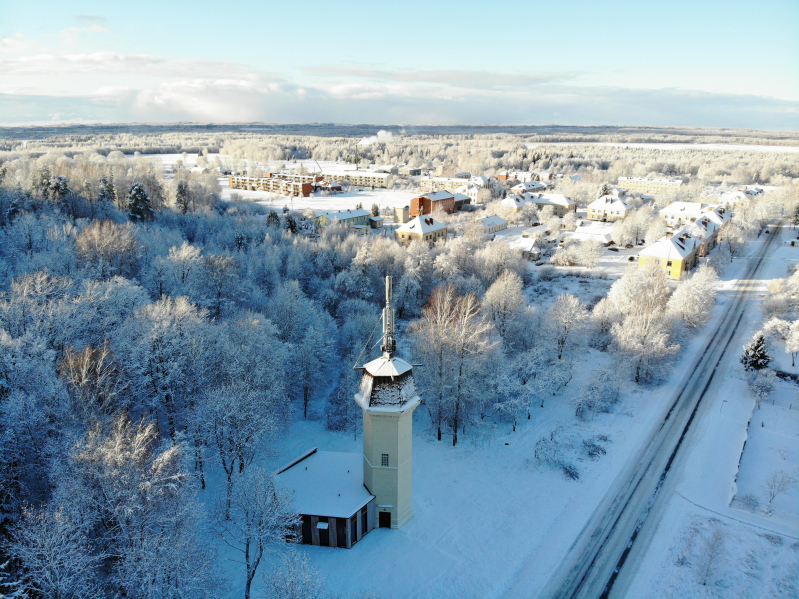
The village of Zilaiskalns in Zilaiskalns Parish in winter.

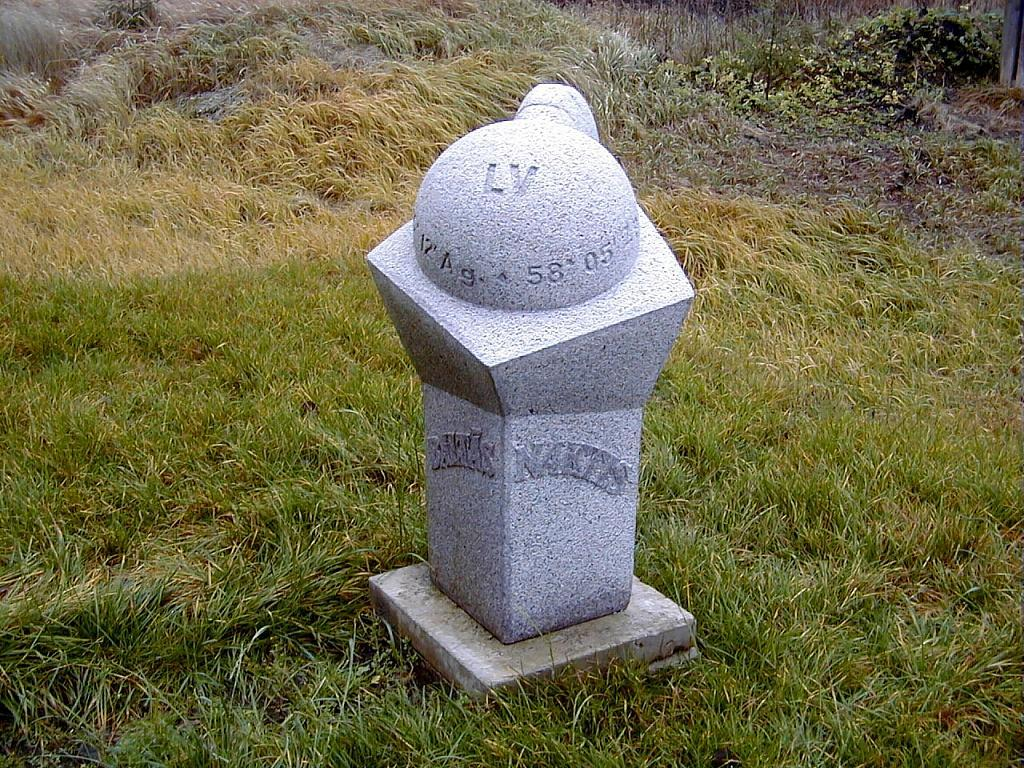
Baltās naktis ("White nights"), Vilnis Titāns, 1999: granite sculpture marking the northernmost point of Latvia in Ipiķi Parish.

Valmiera Municipality covers an area of 2,948 square kilometres (1,138 sq mi). It is located in the northwestern part of the Vidzeme region in northern Latvia, on the border with Estonia. It borders Valka Municipality to the east, Smiltene Municipality to the southeast, Cēsis Municipality to the south, and Limbaži Municipality to the west. It also borders the Estonian counties of Pärnu to the northwest, Viljandi to the north, and Valga to the northeast. The northernmost point of Latvia is located on the border with Estonia in Ipiķi Parish, and is marked with a sculpture by Vilnis Titāns.

The highest point in Valmiera Municipality is Zilaiskalns with an elevation of 127 metres (417 ft) above sea level. The hill was sacred to the ancient Latgalians and home to the Soviet-era folk healer Marta of Zilaiskalns. The Sakala Upland extends from southern Estonia into the northern part of the municipality, its highest point in Latvia being Pikas kalns at 107.6 metres (353 ft) above sea level.

The major rivers in the municipality are:

- the Gauja, whose course upstream of the city of Valmiera is protected by the Ziemeļgauja Protected Landscape Area, and downstream of Valmiera by Gauja National Park; and
- the Salaca, which drains Lake Burtnieks, the largest lake in the municipality.

The northern part of the municipality lies within the North Vidzeme Biosphere Reserve.

== History ==
In 2020, the Saeima approved reducing the number of municipal-level administrative divisions from 119 to 42. Valmiera Municipality was formed from the union of the city of Valmiera with Beverīna Municipality, Burtnieki Municipality, Kocēni Municipality, Mazsalaca Municipality, Naukšēni Municipality, Rūjiena Municipality, and Strenči Municipality. Except for Strenči Municipality, these units were the constituents of the former Valmiera district. Elections for Latvia's new municipal councils were held on 5 June 2021, and the new municipalities including Valmiera will go into effect on 1 July 2021.

== Administration ==
As of 2021, there are 19 seats on the Valmiera municipal council.

The municipality is divided into the city of Valmiera, four towns and 26 parishes:

City

- Valmiera

Towns

- Mazsalaca
- Rūjiena
- Seda
- Strenči

Parishes

- Bērzaine Parish
- Brenguļi Parish
- Burtnieki Parish
- Dikļi Parish
- Ēvele Parish
- Ipiķi Parish
- Jeri Parish
- Jērcēni Parish
- Kauguri Parish
- Kocēni Parish
- Ķoņi Parish
- Lode Parish
- Matīši Parish
- Mazsalaca Parish
- Naukšēni Parish
- Plāņi Parish
- Ramata Parish
- Rencēni Parish
- Sēļi Parish
- Skaņkalne Parish
- Trikāta Parish
- Vaidava Parish
- Valmiera Parish
- Vecate Parish
- Vilpulka Parish
- Zilaiskalns Parish

== Demographics ==
Valmiera is Latvia's second most populous municipality behind Ogre Municipality. The Central Statistical Bureau of Latvia estimated a population of 51,370 living in what is now Valmiera Municipality at the beginning of 2021. This represented a 24% decrease from an estimated population of 67,433 at the beginning of 2000, and a 11% decrease from an estimated population of 57,854 at the beginning of 2011.

The city of Valmiera had an estimated population of 22,971 at the beginning of 2021.

== Economy and infrastructure ==
In 2018, the city of Valmiera recorded a gross domestic product per capita of €16,918, second highest among Latvian cities behind Riga. It is a regional centre for manufacturing and education. Vidzeme University of Applied Sciences is located in Valmiera.

Valmiera Municipality is crossed by national road A3 and the Riga–Lugaži Railway, which serve to connect the municipality with Riga to the southwest and with Valka on the Estonian border to the northeast.

== Notable people ==
- Nicolai Anders von Hartwiss (1793 in Kocēni Parish – 1860), a Russian Baltic German botanist, plant explorer and plant breeder
- Julie Wilhelmine Hagen-Schwarz (1824 – 1902), a Baltic German painter, primarily of portraits.
- Oskar Engelhard von Löwis of Menar (1838 – 1899), a Baltic German ornithologist.
- Dāvids Sīmansons (1859 – 1933), the first commander-in-chief of the Latvian Army.
- Rihards Zariņš (1869 in Kocēni – 1939), a graphic artist.
- Kārlis Reinholds Zariņš (1879 in Ipiķi Parish – 1963), head of the Latvian diplomatic service in exile, 1940 – 1963
- Jānis Balodis (1881 in Trikāta Parish – 1965), an army general and politician, Minister of War (1931–1940),
- Gustav Klutsis (1895 in Ķoņi Parish – 1938), photographer who developed photomontage techniques.
- Yakov Alksnis (1897 in Naukšēni Parish – 1938), Soviet military leader and commander of the Red Army Air Forces, 1931 to 1937.
- Jānis Dimza (1906 in Ipiķi parish – c.1942), decathlete and pole-vaulter, competed in the 1932 Olympic Games
- Jānis Kalmīte (1907 in Kauguri parish - 1996), an expressionist painter
- Andris Ārgalis (born 1944 in Ipiķi Parish), a politician, Mayor of Riga, 2000 to 2001.
- Līga Liepiņa (born 1946 in Naukšēni), a Latvian actress.
