= Ramata Parish =

Parish of Latvia

- parish of Latvia
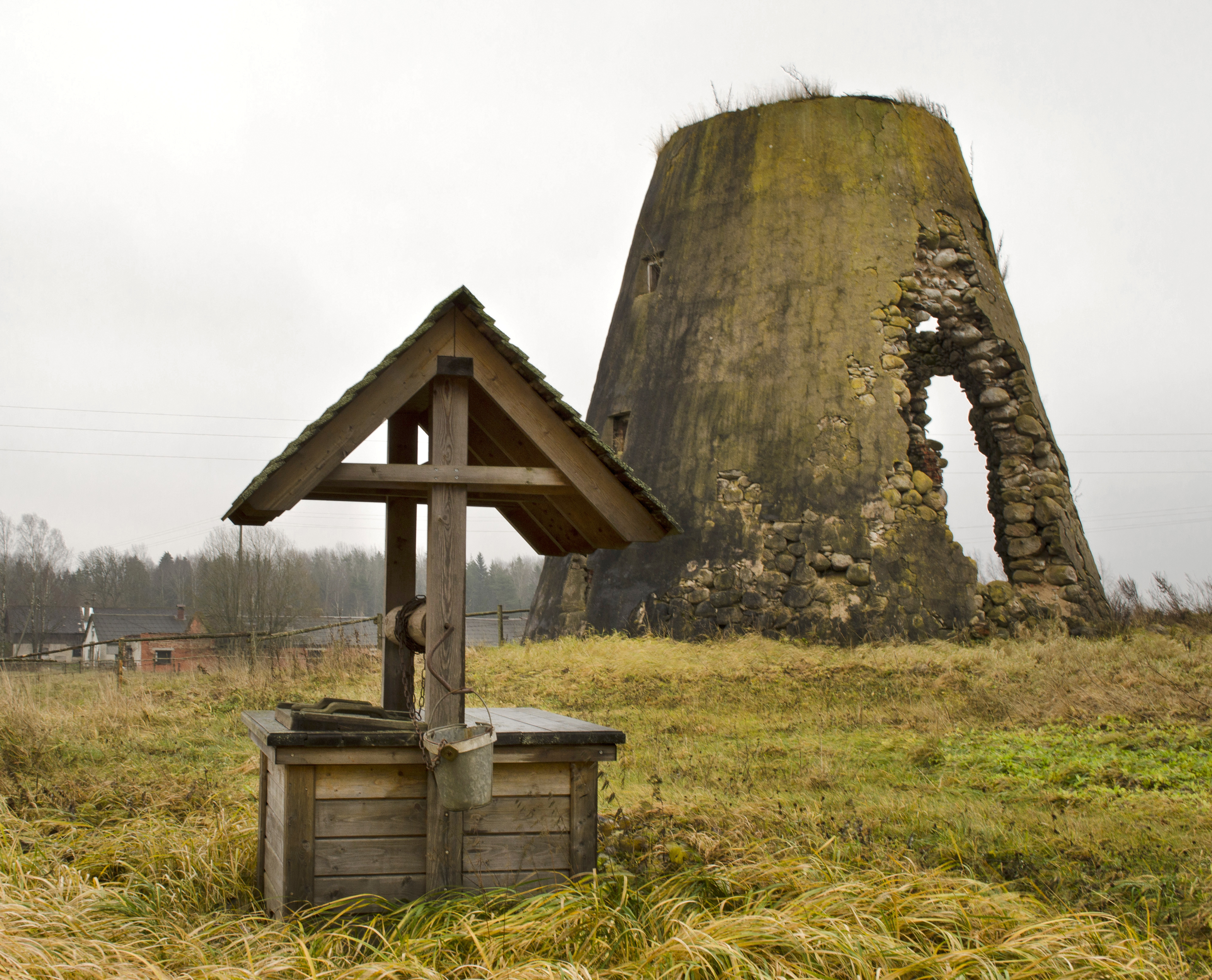

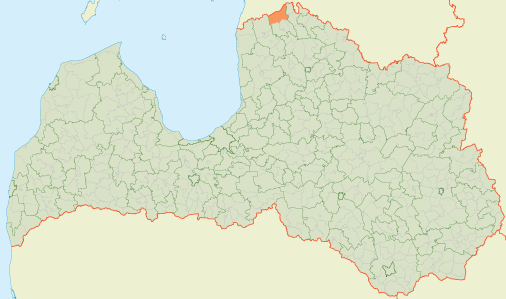
- Coordinates: 57°58′25″N 24°59′41″E
- Country: Latvia

Population (1 January 2026)
  - Total: 345

Ramata Parish (Latvian: Ramatas pagasts) is an administrative unit of Valmiera Municipality in the Vidzeme region of Latvia. Prior to 2009, it was an administrative unit of the former Valmiera district. The administrative center is Ramata village.

== Towns, villages and settlements of Ramata parish ==
- Kundziņi
- Nuķis
- Ramata
- Talcis
- Vērsis
