= Oskar Engelhard von Löwis of Menar =

Baltic German ornithologist

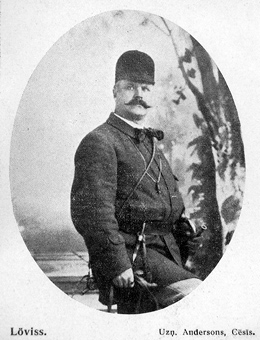
Oskar Engelhard von Löwis of Menar

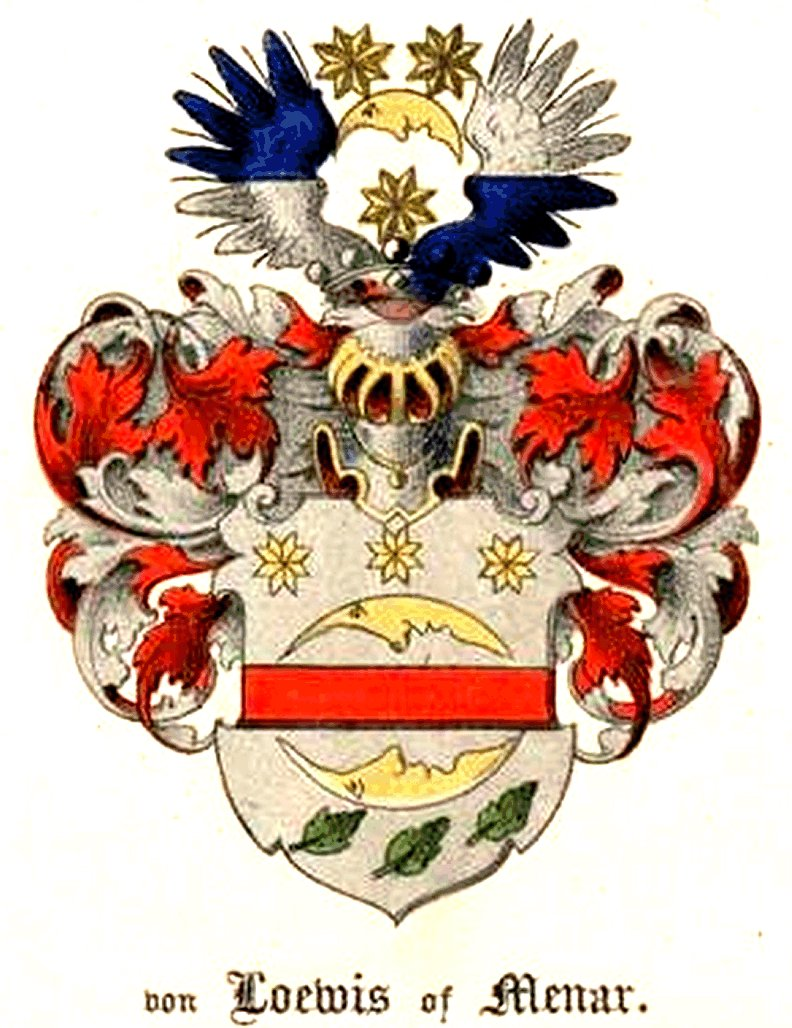
Family coat of arms of the von Löwis of Menar

Oskar Engelhard von Löwis of Menar (5 April 1838–6 August 1899) was a Baltic German ornithologist.

== Life and work ==
He was born in present-day Valmiera district, Latvia (then part of the Russian Empire). He studied physics and economy in Tartu and worked as a public official in different capacities. An avid hunter and ornithologist, he was a member of the Riga Association of Natural Scientists (Der Naturforscherverein zu Riga), predecessor of the Natural History Museum of Latvia from 1878. He contributed to several publications on the bird-life in Latvia, and wrote three books on the subject. Among these is the first book about birds in the Latvian language.

== Selected works ==
- Die Reptilien Kur-, Liv- und Estlands: ein Handbüchlein für alle Naturfreunde in Stadt und Land. Riga: N. Kymmel's Buchhandlung, 1884
- Ievērojamākie Baltijas putni. Rīga: Ernsts Plates, 1893 (in Latvian)
- Unsere Baltischen Singvögel. Reval: Franz Kluge, 1895
- Diebe und Käuber in der Baltischen Vogelwelt. Riga: Deubner, 1898
