= Vilpulka Parish =

Parish of Latvia

- parish of Latvia
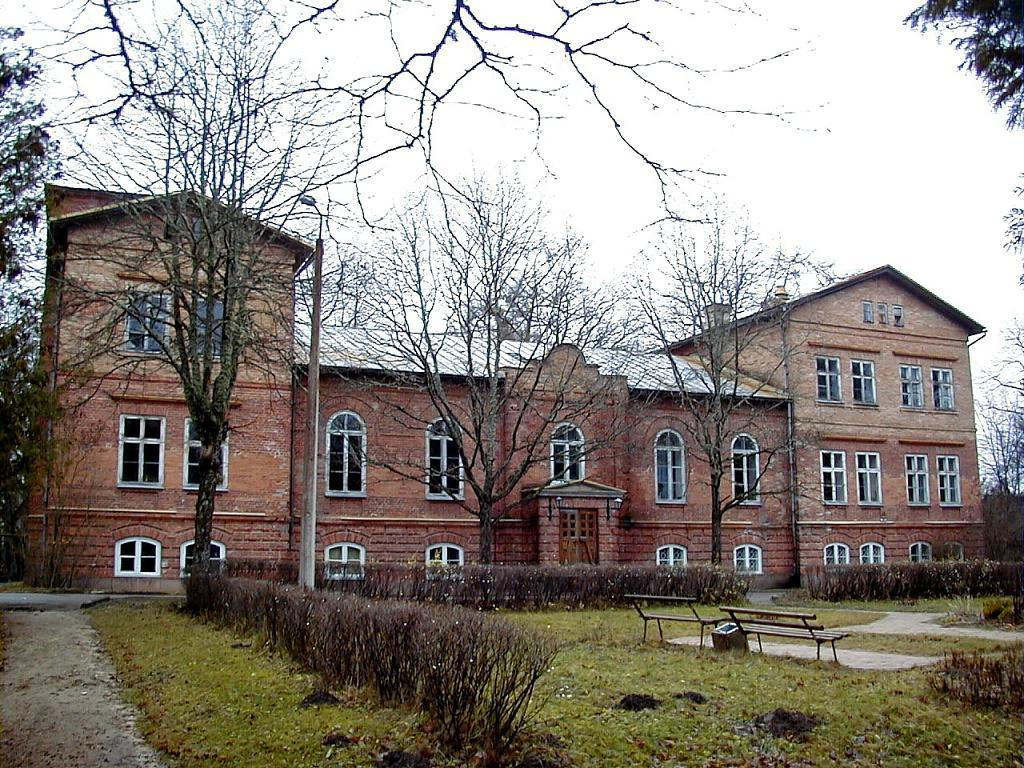

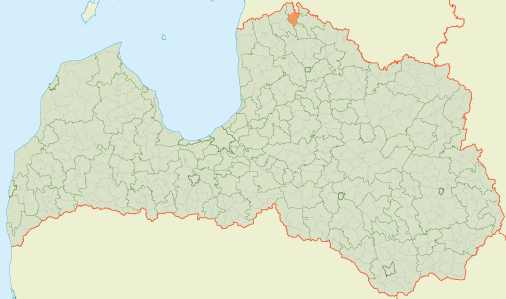
- 57°57′05″N 25°13′10″E

- Location within Latvia
- Country: Latvia

Area
  - Total: 88.43 km^{2} (34.14 sq mi)
  - Land: 86.49 km^{2} (33.39 sq mi)
  - Water: 1.94 km^{2} (0.75 sq mi)

Population (1 January 2026)
  - Total: 380
  - Density: 4.4/km^{2} (11/sq mi)

Vilpulka Parish (Latvian: Vilpulkas pagasts) is an administrative unit of Valmiera Municipality in the Vidzeme region of Latvia.

== Towns, villages and settlements of Vilpulka parish ==
- Vilpulka (parish center)
- Brindas
- Jaunāmuiža
- Virķēni

== See also ==
- Rūjiena (town)
- Ipiķi Parish
- Jeri Parish
- Lode Parish
