= Lode Parish =

Parish of Latvia

- parish of Latvia
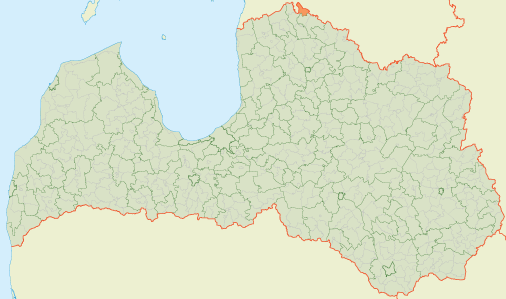
- 58°00′59″N 25°21′32″E

- Location within Latvia
- Country: Latvia

Area
  - Total: 63.81 km^{2} (24.64 sq mi)
  - Land: 62.04 km^{2} (23.95 sq mi)
  - Water: 1.77 km^{2} (0.68 sq mi)

Population (1 January 2026)
  - Total: 270
  - Density: 4.4/km^{2} (11/sq mi)

Lode Parish (Latvian: Lodes pagasts) is an administrative unit of Valmiera Municipality in the Vidzeme region of Latvia.

== Towns, villages and settlements of Lode parish ==
- Lode (parish center)
- Arakste

== See also ==
- Rūjiena (town)
- Ipiķi Parish
- Jeri Parish
- Vilpulka Parish
