= Dikļi Parish =

Parish of Latvia

- parish of Latvia
- Coat of arms

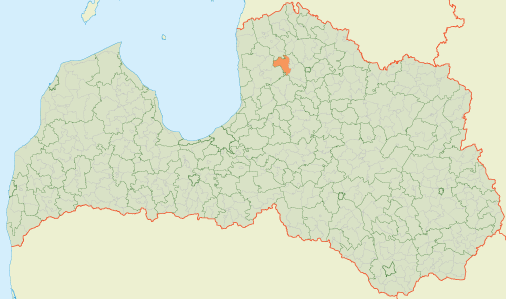
- Coordinates: 57°34′54″N 25°03′07″E
- Country: Latvia

Population (1 January 2026)
  - Total: 879

Dikļi Parish (Latvian: Dikļu pagasts) is an administrative unit of Valmiera Municipality in the Vidzeme region of Latvia. Prior to the 2009 administrative reforms it was part of Valmiera district.

== History ==
Dikli is a quiet rural village in the northern part of Latvia that is home to around only five hundred people. In Latvia, Dikļi is well known as the birthplace of the traditions of the Latvian theatre and song festivals.

In 1818, Dikļi Palace was the venue for a performance of Friedrich Schiller's play “The Robbers” translated by a servant on the estate, Janis Peitans, in which the local farmers resident in the vicinity of Dikli took to the stage as actors.

During the summer festival of 1864, not far from the Dikļi Estate Park, the first-ever song festival took place organised by clergyman and writer, Juris Neikens.

Dikļi is richly endowed with various historical objects. The avenue of oak trees leading from Dikļi Palace Hotel leads directly to a small wooden church built as a pile building back in 1722 which was transformed into a brick building in 1848 retaining its previous form. From 1857 to 1867, the vicar of this church was Juris Neikens. The church is home to one of the most ornamental of baroque era church altars in Vidzeme (built in 1698) and a pulpit (built in 1699) which was created by a sculptor from the Riga sculptors’ workshop, J. D. Strauss who also worked on the stone figures that the feature in the portal of St. Peter's Church in Riga and who also created the interior elements of the church in Ugale. The pulpit was further developed from 1730 to 1750 by A. H. Konciuss who was based in Estonia.
