= Vaidava Parish =

Parish of Latvia

- parish of Latvia
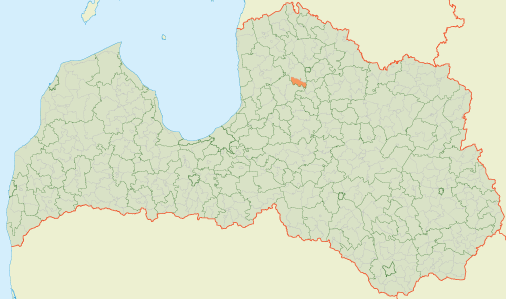
- Coordinates: 57°25′54″N 25°16′30″E
- Country: Latvia

Population (1 January 2026)
  - Total: 861

Vaidava Parish (Latvian: Vaidavas pagasts) is an administrative unit of Valmiera Municipality in the Vidzeme region of Latvia. Prior to the 2009 administrative reforms, it was part of Valmiera district.

== Towns, villages and settlements of Vaidava parish ==
- Vaidava (Kocēni Municipality), Latvia – parish administrative center
