= Sēļi Parish =

Parish of Latvia

- parish of Latvia
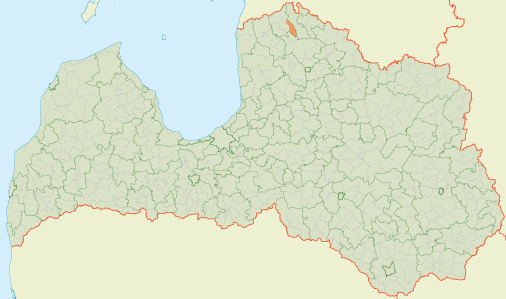
- Coordinates: 57°52′20″N 25°11′13″E
- Country: Latvia

Population (1 January 2026)
  - Total: 290

Sēļi Parish (Latvian: Sēļu pagasts) is an administrative territorial entity of Valmiera Municipality in the Vidzeme region of Latvia. Prior to 2009, it was an administrative unit of the former Valmiera district. The administrative center is Sēļi village.

== Towns, villages and settlements of Sēļi Parish ==
- Idus
- Pantene
- Pilāti
- Sēļi – parish administrative center
