= Skaņkalne Parish =

Parish of Latvia

- parish of Latvia
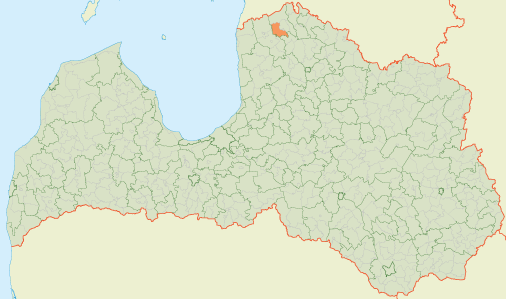
- Coordinates: 57°51′25″N 24°59′11″E
- Country: Latvia

Population (1 January 2026)
  - Total: 550

Skaņkalne parish (Latvian: Skaņkalnes pagasts) is an administrative territorial entity of Valmiera Municipality in the Vidzeme region of Latvia. Prior to 2009, it was an administrative unit of the former Valmiera district. Town Mazsalaca is parish administrative center.

== Towns, villages and settlements of Skaņkalne parish ==
- Dzintari
- Ģenderti
- Jaunatne
- Ķurbēni
- Silaņģi
- Skaņkalne
