= Ipiķi Parish =

Parish of Latvia

- parish of Latvia
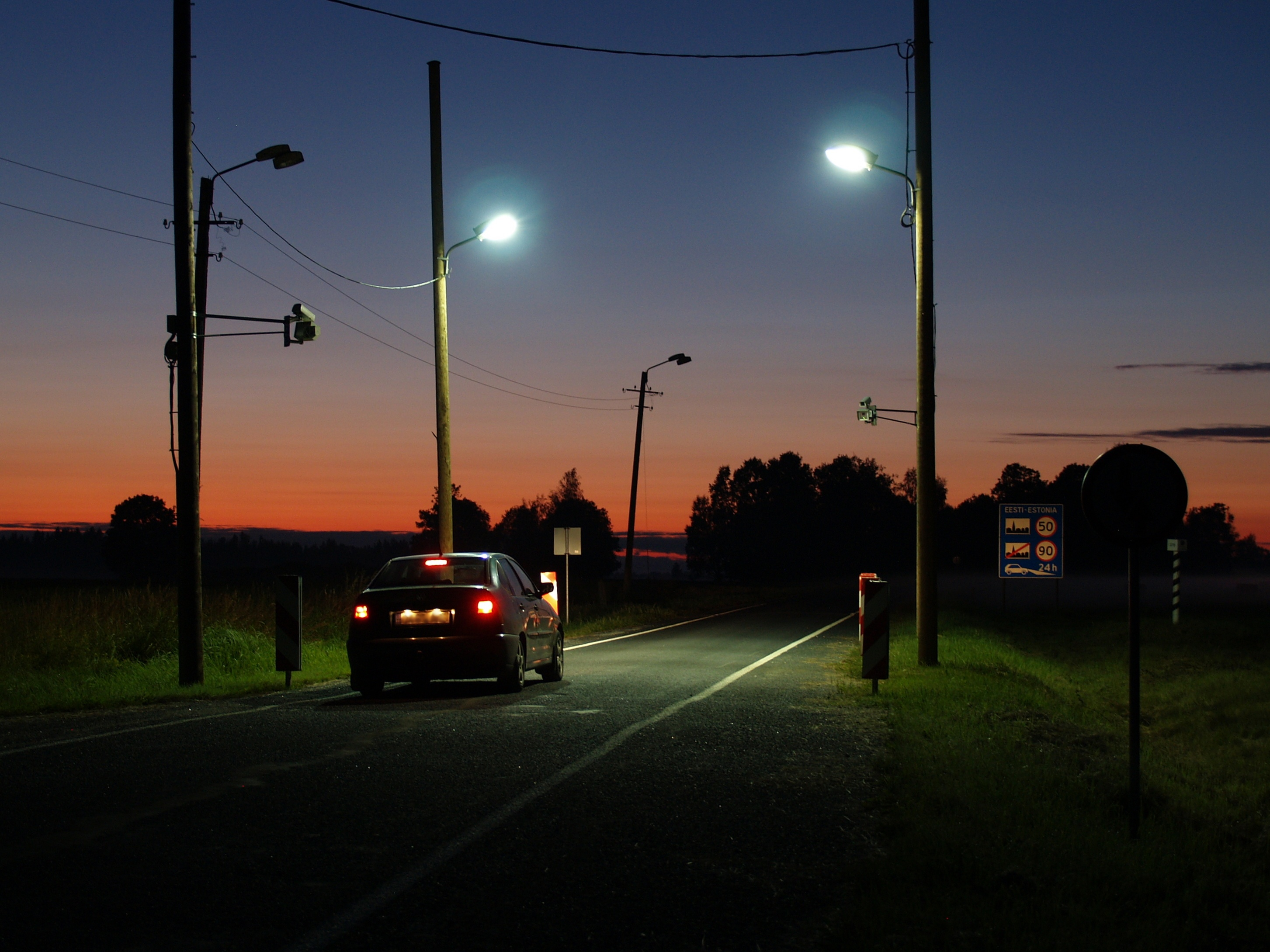

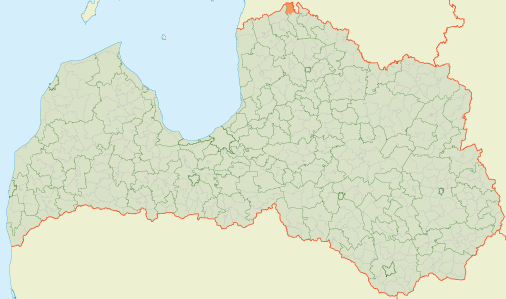
- 58°01′53″N 25°09′58″E
- Country: Latvia

Area
  - Total: 67.33 km^{2} (26.00 sq mi)
  - Land: 65.52 km^{2} (25.30 sq mi)
  - Water: 1.81 km^{2} (0.70 sq mi)

Population (1 January 2026)
  - Total: 143
  - Density: 2.18/km^{2} (5.65/sq mi)

Ipiķi Parish (Latvian: Ipiķu pagasts) is an administrative unit of Valmiera Municipality in the Vidzeme region of Latvia. It is the northernmost point of Latvia.

== Towns, villages and settlements of Ipiķi parish ==
- Ipiķi (parish center)
- Ipiķu skola
- Ķirbēni

== See also ==
- Rūjiena (town)
- Jeri Parish
- Lode Parish
- Vilpulka Parish
