= Zilaiskalns Parish =

Parish of Latvia

- parish of Latvia
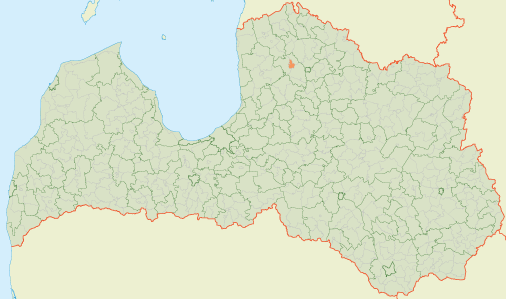
- Coordinates: 57°34′39″N 25°10′26″E
- Country: Latvia

Population (1 January 2026)
  - Total: 732

Zilaiskalns Parish (Latvian: Zilākalna pagasts) is an administrative unit of Valmiera Municipality in the Vidzeme region of Latvia.

== Towns, villages and settlements of Zilaiskalns parish ==
- Zilaiskalns
