= Rencēni Parish =

Parish of Latvia

- parish of Latvia
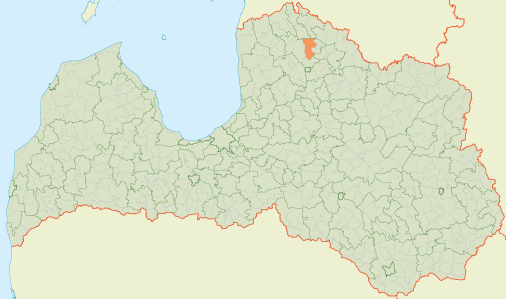
- 57°42′53″N 25°27′03″E

- Location within Latvia
- Country: Latvia

Area
  - Total: 159.74 km^{2} (61.68 sq mi)
  - Land: 156.37 km^{2} (60.37 sq mi)
  - Water: 3.37 km^{2} (1.30 sq mi)

Population (1 January 2026)
  - Total: 1,243
  - Density: 7.949/km^{2} (20.59/sq mi)

Rencēni Parish (Latvian: Rencēnu pagasts) is an administrative territorial entity of Valmiera Municipality in the Vidzeme region of Latvia.
