= Mazsalaca Parish =

Parish in Valmiera Municipality, Latvia

- parish of Latvia
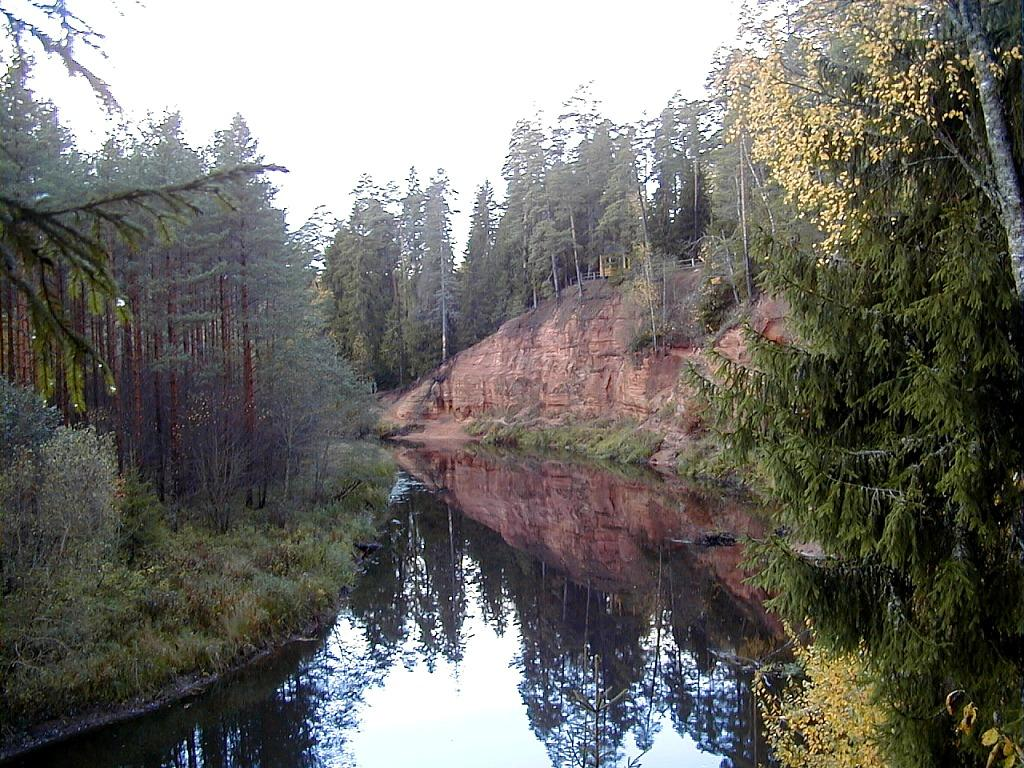

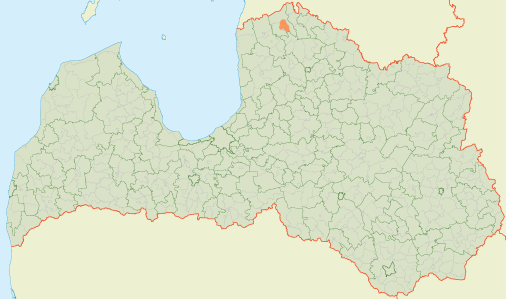
- 57°53′35″N 25°04′40″E
- Country: Latvia

Area
  - Total: 70.08 km^{2} (27.06 sq mi)
  - Land: 69.08 km^{2} (26.67 sq mi)
  - Water: 1 km^{2} (0.39 sq mi)

Population (1 January 2025)
  - Total: 482
  - Density: 6.98/km^{2} (18.1/sq mi)
- Website: www.mazsalaca.lv

Mazsalaca Parish (Latvian: Mazsalacas pagasts) is an administrative unit of Valmiera Municipality in the Vidzeme region of Latvia. It was created in 2010 from the countryside territory of Mazsalaca town. At the beginning of 2014, the population of the parish was 650. The administrative centre is the town of Mazsalaca, which is located outside of the borders of the parish.

== Villages and settlements of Mazsalaca Parish ==
- Blāķi
- Blanka
- Parkmaļi
- Priedāji
- Promulti
- Tīši
- Unguri
