= Vecate Parish =

Parish of Latvia

- parish of Latvia
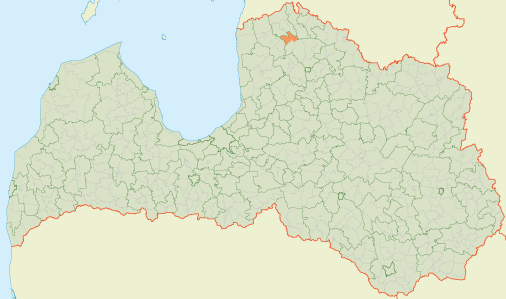
- 57°47′32″N 25°08′52″E
- Country: Latvia

Area
  - Total: 89.42 km^{2} (34.53 sq mi)
  - Land: 82.44 km^{2} (31.83 sq mi)
  - Water: 6.98 km^{2} (2.69 sq mi)

Population (1 January 2025)
  - Total: 332
  - Density: 4.03/km^{2} (10.4/sq mi)

Vecate Parish (Latvian: Vecates pagasts) is an administrative unit of Valmiera Municipality in the Vidzeme region of Latvia. It is located in northern Latvia, south of the town of Mazsalaca, near the river Salaca and Lake Burtnieks which is fourth largest lake in Latvia. The area covers 8974 ha and population is approx 564. One of the most outstanding European Stone Age settlements such as Fishermen Archaeological Complex "Zvejnieki" (contains settlement and the cemetery), ancient settlement "Kaulenkalns" (archaeological excavations by E.Sturm in 1943. - 1944.) and "Rinnukalns" (archaeological excavations by Carl Georg von Sievers in 1875. - 1877.; A.Zommers in 1881. and E. Sturm in 1943.) are located in this area. Vecate parish developed around the former Alt-Ottenhof manor and it was first mentioned in historical sources in 1640. The area benefits from the local boathouse, library with free public WiFi access, doctorate, open-air stage with sports facilities, newly build community centre and a local shop. "Vecate" boathouse has been very popular to anglers and hunters for many years and provides a hire of rowing / fishing boats, also anglers can purchase local fishing licences for legal fishing in the river and lake.
