= Ēvele Parish =

Parish of Latvia

- parish of Latvia
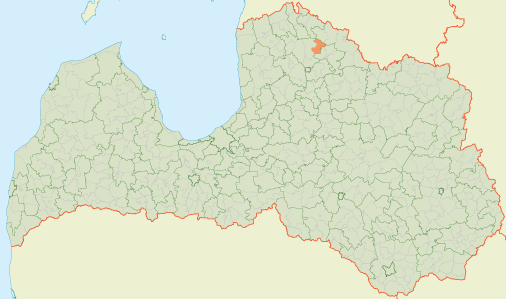
- Coordinates: 57°43′12″N 25°35′04″E
- Country: Latvia

Population (1 January 2026)
  - Total: 389

Ēvele Parish (Latvian: Ēveles pagasts) is an administrative territorial entity of Valmiera Municipality in the Vidzeme region of Latvia.

== Towns, villages and settlements of Ēvele Parish ==
- Ēvele - parish administrative center
