= Matīši Parish =

Parish of Latvia

- parish of Latvia
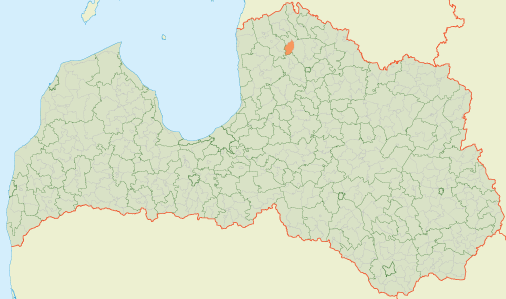
- 57°42′46″N 25°08′55″E
- Country: Latvia

Area
  - Total: 71.21 km^{2} (27.49 sq mi)
  - Land: 71.21 km^{2} (27.49 sq mi)
  - Water: 9.22 km^{2} (3.56 sq mi)

Population (1 January 2024)
  - Total: 753
  - Density: 11/km^{2} (27/sq mi)

Matīši Parish (Latvian: Matīšu pagasts) is an administrative unit of Valmiera Municipality in the Vidzeme region of Latvia.
