= Rūjiena =

Town in Valmiera Municipality, Latvia

- Town
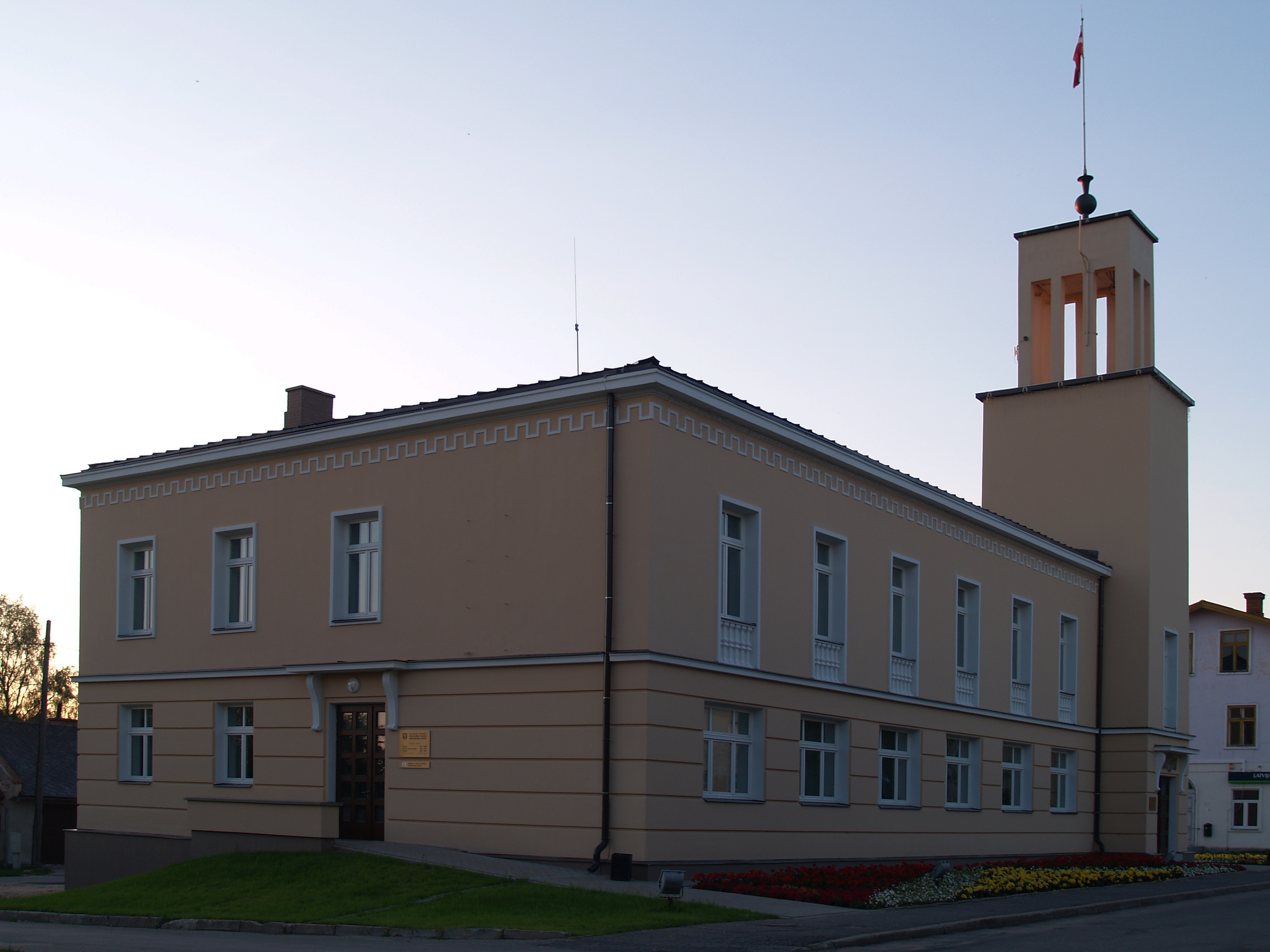
- Rūjiena town hall

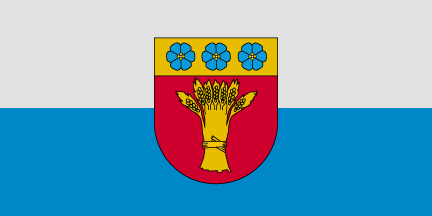
- Flag Coat of arms

- Location in Latvia
- Coordinates: 57°53′49.85″N 25°19′33.24″E
- Country: Latvia
- Municipality: Valmiera
- Town: Rūjiena
- Town rights: 1920

Government
  - Mayor: Guntis Gladkins
  - City council: 9 members

Area
  - Total: 7.76 km^{2} (3.00 sq mi)
  - Land: 7.56 km^{2} (2.92 sq mi)
  - Water: 0.2 km^{2} (0.077 sq mi)

Population (2026)
  - Total: 2,565
  - Density: 339/km^{2} (879/sq mi)
- Time zone: UTC+2 (EET)
  - Summer (DST): UTC+3 (EEST)
- Postal code: LV-4240
- Calling code: +371 642
- Climate: Dfb
- Website: www.rujiena.lv

Rūjiena (German: Rujen; Estonian: Ruhja) is a town in Valmiera Municipality, in the Vidzeme region of Latvia. As of 2017 its population was 3,007.

== Geography ==
The town is located in northern Latvia, near the border with Estonia, in the historical region of Vidzeme (anciently part of Livonia). It is 50 km (31 mi) from Valmiera, 91 km (57 mi) from Pärnu and 152 km (94 mi) from Riga.

=== Climate ===
Rūjiena has a humid continental climate (Köppen Dfb).

Climate data for Rūjiena (1991-2020 normals, extremes 1940-present)
Month	Jan	Feb	Mar	Apr	May	Jun	Jul	Aug	Sep	Oct	Nov	Dec	Year
Record high °C (°F)	9.7 (49.5)	10.7 (51.3)	18.1 (64.6)	27.8 (82.0)	29.9 (85.8)	32.5 (90.5)	34.4 (93.9)	35.6 (96.1)	29.0 (84.2)	21.3 (70.3)	14.0 (57.2)	11.6 (52.9)	35.6 (96.1)
Mean daily maximum °C (°F)	−1.5 (29.3)	−1.3 (29.7)	3.3 (37.9)	11.0 (51.8)	16.9 (62.4)	20.4 (68.7)	23.1 (73.6)	21.8 (71.2)	16.4 (61.5)	9.4 (48.9)	3.4 (38.1)	0.0 (32.0)	10.2 (50.4)
Daily mean °C (°F)	−3.8 (25.2)	−4.2 (24.4)	−0.4 (31.3)	5.9 (42.6)	11.5 (52.7)	15.3 (59.5)	17.8 (64.0)	16.6 (61.9)	11.7 (53.1)	6.0 (42.8)	1.4 (34.5)	−1.9 (28.6)	6.3 (43.4)
Mean daily minimum °C (°F)	−6.5 (20.3)	−7.3 (18.9)	−4.1 (24.6)	0.9 (33.6)	5.3 (41.5)	9.5 (49.1)	12.2 (54.0)	11.3 (52.3)	7.2 (45.0)	2.7 (36.9)	−1.0 (30.2)	−4.3 (24.3)	2.2 (35.9)
Record low °C (°F)	−42.2 (−44.0)	−38.7 (−37.7)	−30.2 (−22.4)	−18.5 (−1.3)	−6.5 (20.3)	−1.1 (30.0)	2.8 (37.0)	1.0 (33.8)	−5.8 (21.6)	−13.9 (7.0)	−21.3 (−6.3)	−39.2 (−38.6)	−42.2 (−44.0)
Average precipitation mm (inches)	51.3 (2.02)	39.7 (1.56)	36.2 (1.43)	38.8 (1.53)	50.4 (1.98)	80.6 (3.17)	71.2 (2.80)	80.8 (3.18)	56.0 (2.20)	77.7 (3.06)	59.7 (2.35)	52.6 (2.07)	695 (27.35)
Average precipitation days (≥ 1 mm)	12	9	9	8	8	10	10	11	10	12	12	12	123
Average relative humidity (%)	89.0	86.7	78.7	70.4	67.9	73.2	75.8	79.2	83.4	87.5	90.5	90.8	81.1
Source 1: LVĢMC
Source 2: NOAA (precipitation days, humidity 1991-2020)

== Demographics ==
In 2021, the town had 2,725 inhabitants, 95% of whom were ethnically Latvians.

=== Population changes ===
Historical population
Year	Pop.	±%
1881	1,709	—
1897	2,946	+72.4%
1925	4,830	+64.0%
1935	4,337	−10.2%
1943	4,001	−7.7%
1959	3,507	−12.3%
1979	3,804	+8.5%
1989	3,987	+4.8%
1997	3,849	−3.5%
2011	3,342	−13.2%
2017	2,952	−11.7%
Source: Latvian Geospatial Information Agency

=== Ethnicities ===
Year	Population	Latvians	Russians	Belarusians	Ukrainians	Poles	Lithuanians	Others
2000	3721	3543	95	17	24	17	7	18
2021	2683	2558	61	13	18	11	3	19

== Personalities ==
- Arturs Alberings (1876–1934), Prime Minister of Latvia from 7 May 1926 to 18 December 1926
- Dāvis Bertāns, basketball player, 1992
- Gustav Klutsis (1895–1938), constructivist photographer and graphic designer
- Kārlis Pētersons (1903 – possibly in 1980), wrestler
- Moses Wolf Goldberg (1905–1964), chemist
- Edvīns Bietags (1908–1983), wrestler
- Nehemiah Levanon (1915–2003), Israeli official

== Gallery ==
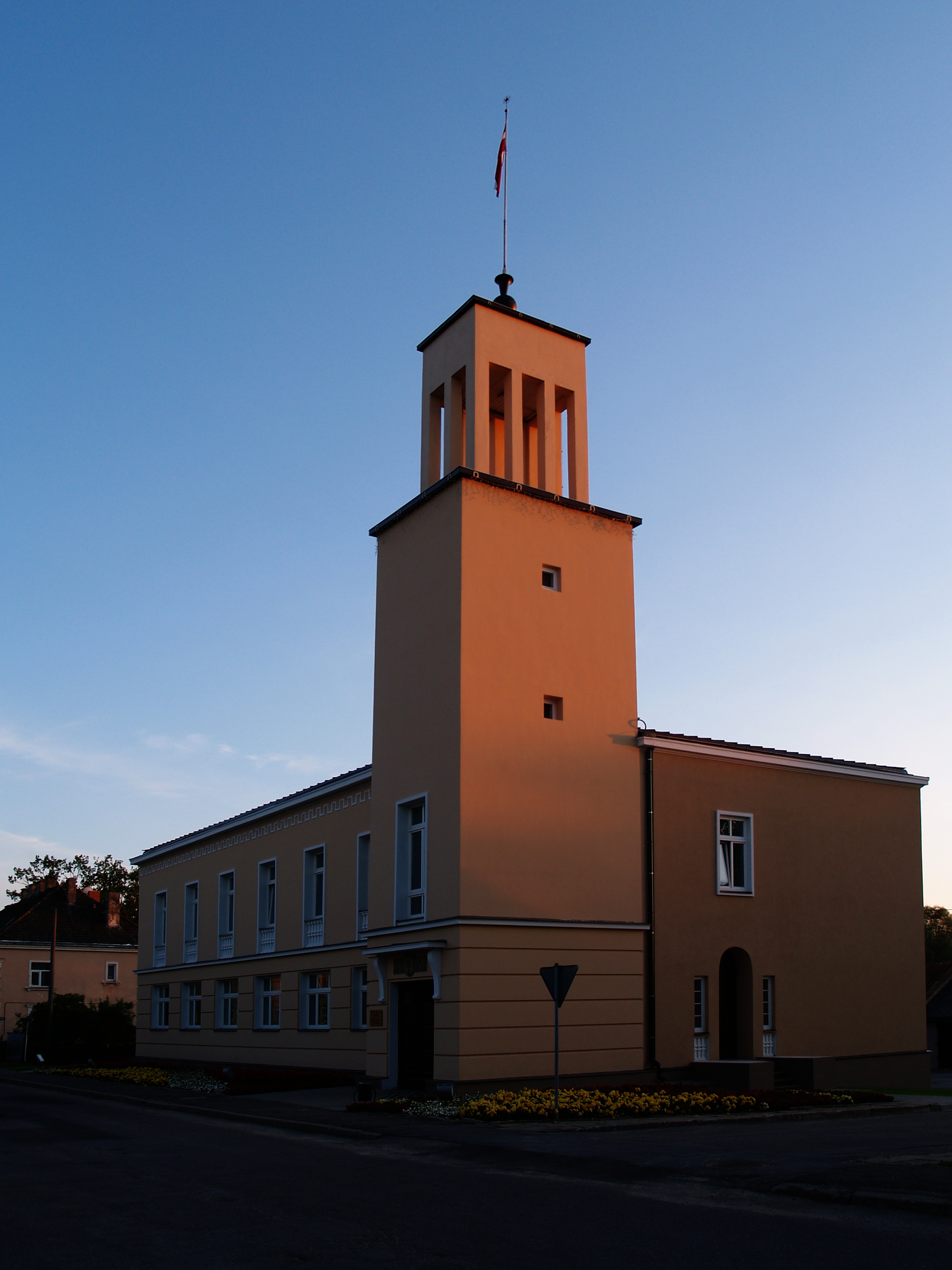
Town hall's tower

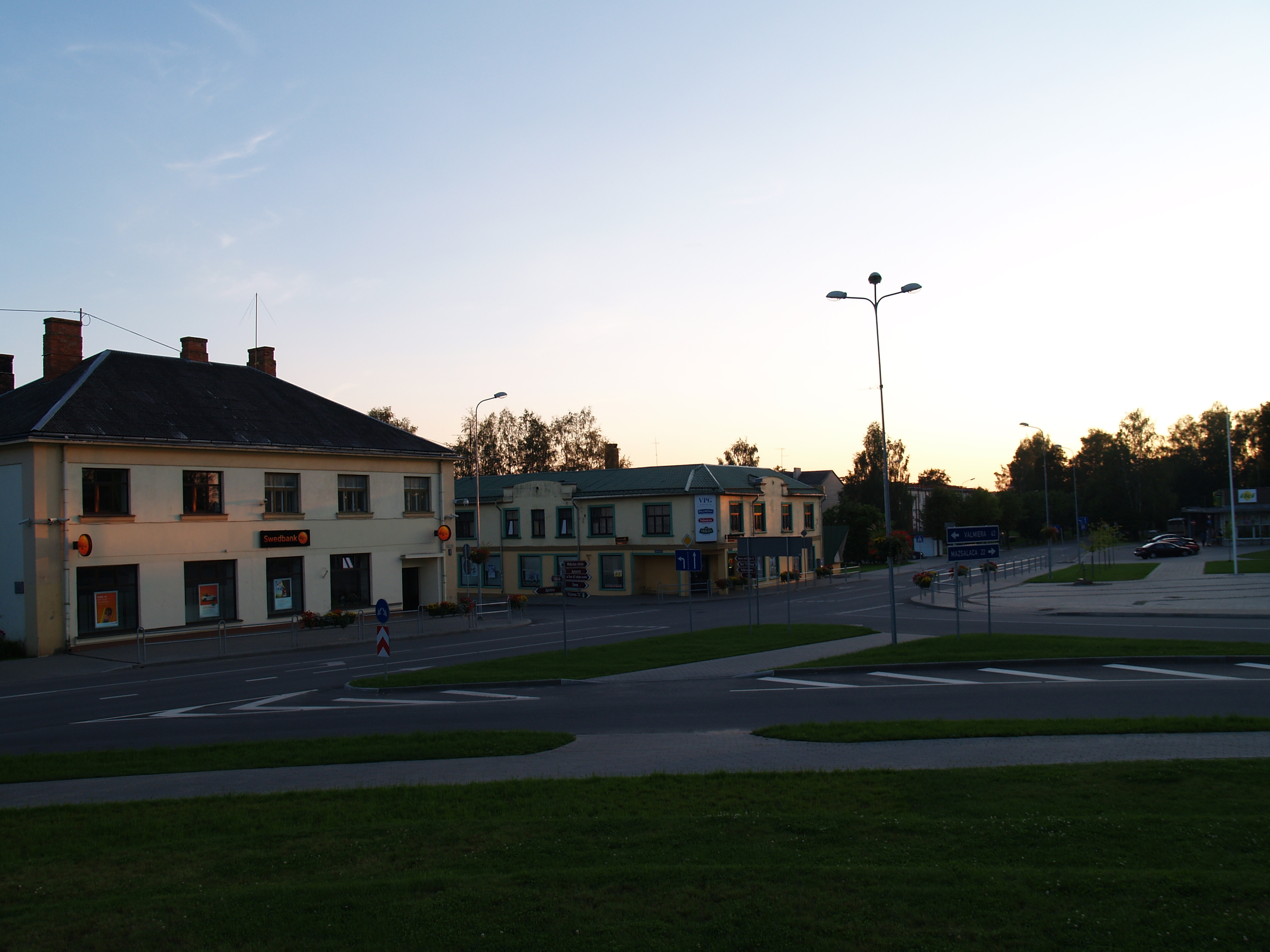
Town's center

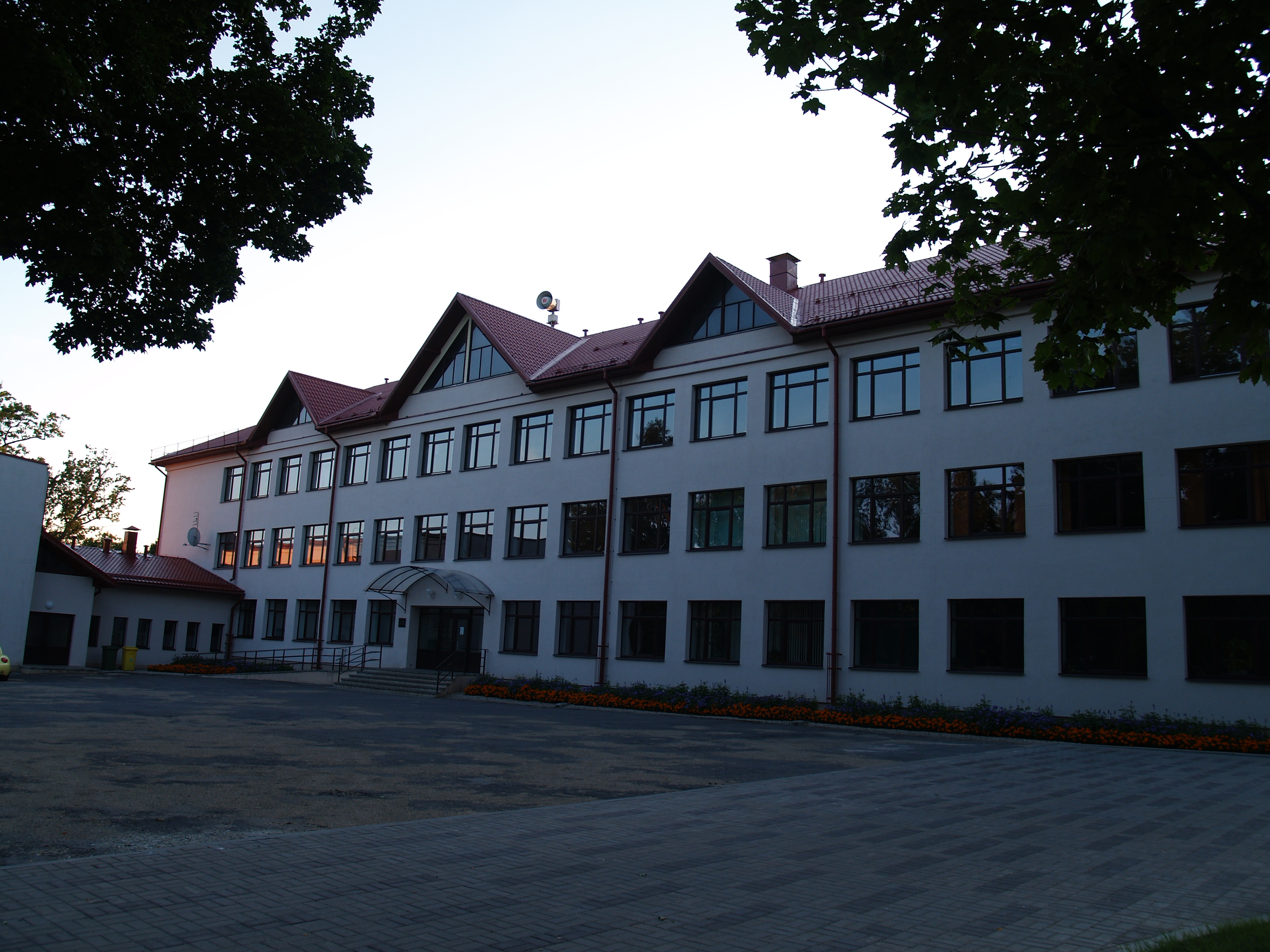
Rūjiena secondary school

== See also ==
- List of cities in Latvia
- Ipiķi parish
- Jeri parish
- Lode parish
- Vilpulka parish
- Rujiena Castle
