= Jeri Parish =

Parish of Latvia

- parish of Latvia
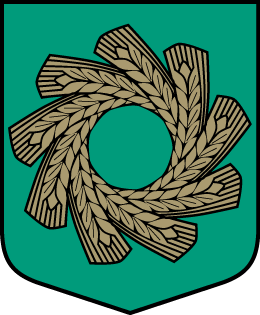
- Coat of arms

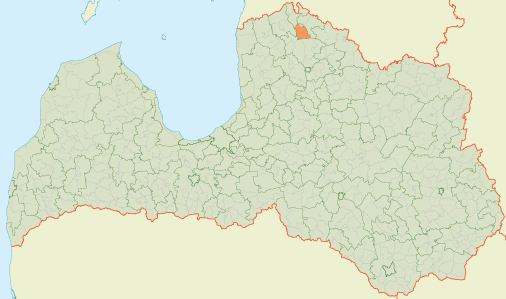
- 57°50′21″N 25°20′15″E
- Country: Latvia

Area
  - Total: 125.44 km^{2} (48.43 sq mi)
  - Land: 122.2 km^{2} (47.2 sq mi)
  - Water: 3.24 km^{2} (1.25 sq mi)

Population (1 January 2026)
  - Total: 1,034
  - Density: 8.462/km^{2} (21.92/sq mi)

Jeri Parish (Latvian: Jeru pagasts) is an administrative unit of Valmiera Municipality in the Vidzeme region of Latvia.

== Towns, villages and settlements of Jeri parish ==
- Endzele (parish center)
- Jeri
- Oleri
- Oleru muiža
