= Valmiera district =

Former district of Latvia

Coordinates: 57°33′N 25°24′E

Valmiera
- District
- Coat of arms

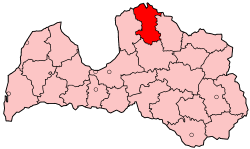
- Country: Latvia
- Established: 31 December 1949
- Dissolved: 1 July 2009

Area
  - Total: 2,373 km^{2} (916 sq mi)

Population
  - Total: 60,111
  - Density: 25.33/km^{2} (65.61/sq mi)
- Website: valmraj.lv/

The Valmiera district (Latvian: Valmieras rajons) was an administrative division of Latvia, located in the Vidzeme region, in the country's north-east. Its administrative center was Valmiera. It bordered Estonia to the north and the former districts of Limbaži to the west, Valka to the east and Cēsis to the south. It was the eighth largest district in Latvia and had a population of 60,345 (2000 census).

Districts were eliminated during the administrative-territorial reform in 2009, after they had been introduced during the Soviet occupation of Latvia in 1949, replacing counties.

== Towns in Valmiera district ==
- Valmiera
- Mazsalaca
- Rūjiena

== See also ==
- Valmiera County
