= Church of the Intercession =

Church of the Intercession may refer to:

- Church of the Intercession, Harbin, China
- Church of the Intercession (Manhattan), New York, United States
- Church of the Intercession (Sławatycze), Poland
- Church of the Intercession (Mary), Turkmenistan
- Intercession of the Theotokos Church, Riga, Latvia

== Russia ==
- Church of the Intercession (Elizavetinskaya), Russia
- Church of the Intercession (Kamensk-Shakhtinsky), Russia
- Church of the Intercession of the Most Holy Mother of God in Khanty-Mansiysk, Russia
- Church of the Intercession (Konstantinovsk), Russia
- Church of the Intercession on the Nerl, Bogolyubovo, Russia
- Church of the Intercession (Novocherkassk), Russia
- Church of the Intercession of the Virgin Mary, Tomsk, Russia
