= Christoph Haberland =

Baltic German architect

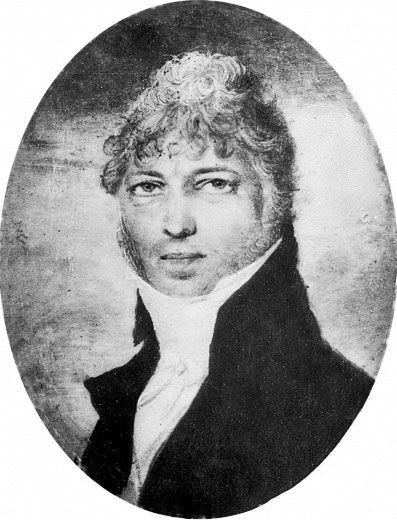
- Born: 1 January 1750; Riga, Russian Empire
- Died: 7 March 1803 (aged 53); Riga, Russian Empire
- Known for: Architecture
- Movement: Classicism

Christoph Haberland (Latvian: Kristofs Hāberlands) was a Baltic German architect, chief architect of Riga and is considered one of the most illustrious masters of classical architecture in Latvian history.

== Biography ==
Christoph Haberland was born in Riga to a mason on 1 January 1750. Both his parents originated from Saxony. In early age he started to learn from his father — mason Johann Andreas Haberland, who came from Saxony and in 1749 became a citizen of the city of Riga. Later Christoph Haberland traveled to Germany and as a journeyman studied in Berlin and Dresden. In 1777 Haberland returned to Riga, passed his exam of master craftsmen and was admitted in the mason guild. In 1778 he becomes the assistant of the Riga chief architect J.P. Leicht. When Leicht died in 1789 Haberland was appointed as his successor. He was chief architect of Riga until 1797.

Haberland was first to attempt the transformation of the medieval image of Riga according to the ideas of Enlightenment. His adapting many innovative ideas and a fresh look at architecture made Haberland one of the pioneers of classicism architecture in Riga. He designed about 20 dwelling houses in Riga, and some churches and manor houses around Riga and in Estonia. One of those churches, Katlakalna Lutheran Church, near Riga is considered his best work and is built as the Roman pantheon in miniature.

Christoph Haberland died on 7 March 1803 in Riga. He was interred in the Riga Great cemetery.

== Gallery ==
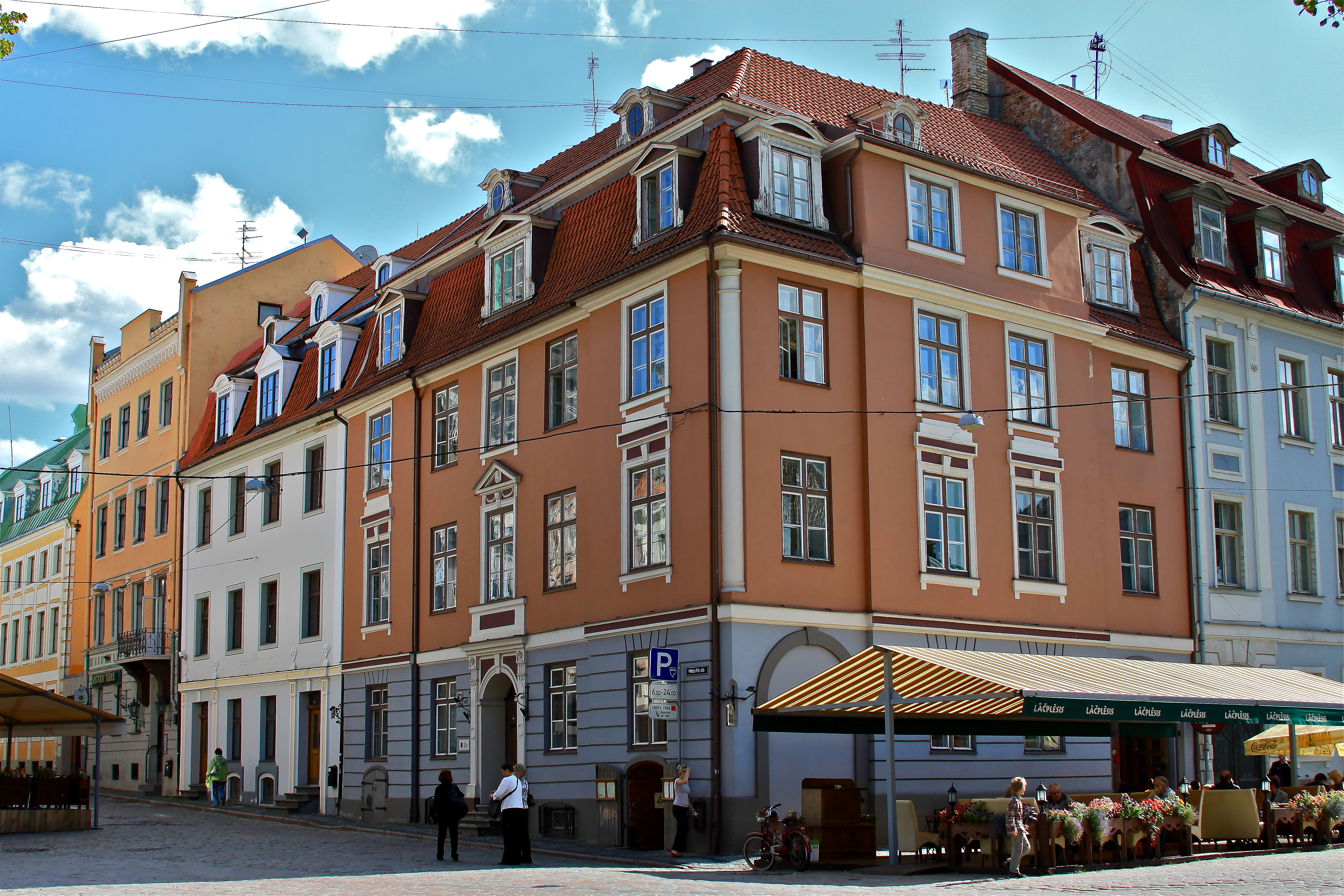
Building on the corner of Mazā Pils Street, Riga.

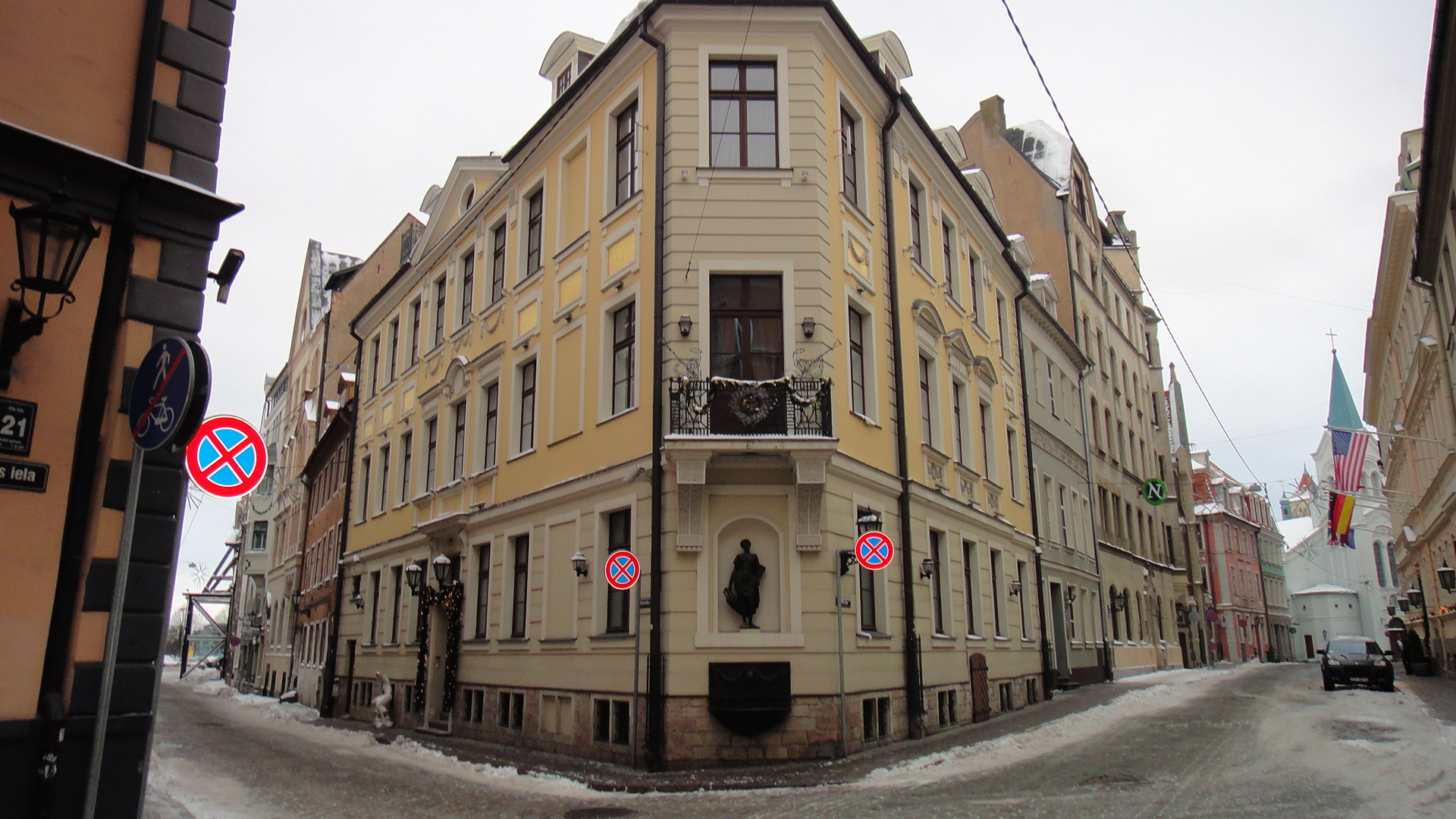
Building on the corner of Miesnieku Street, Riga.

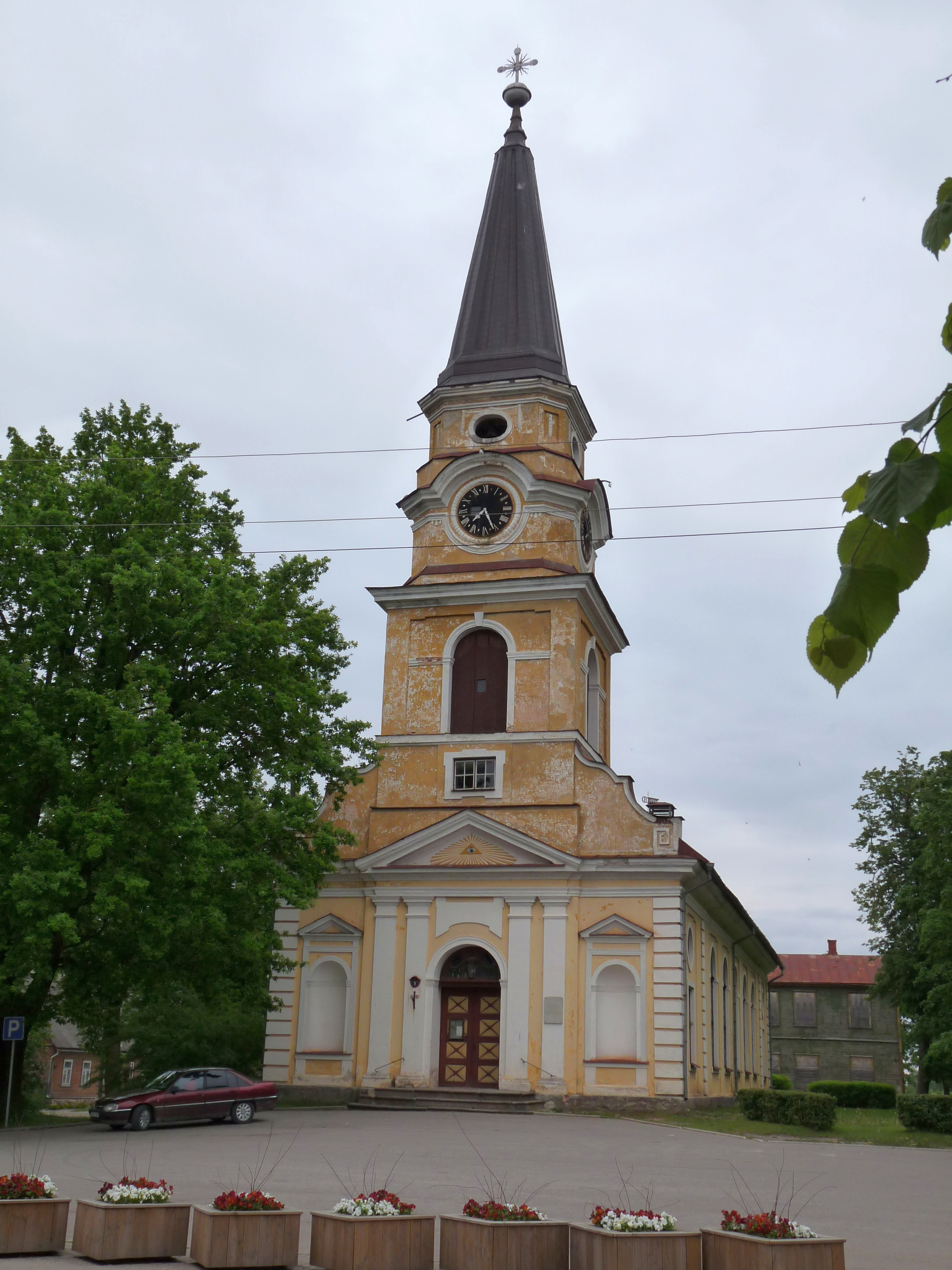
The Katherine Lutheran Church in Võru, Estonia.

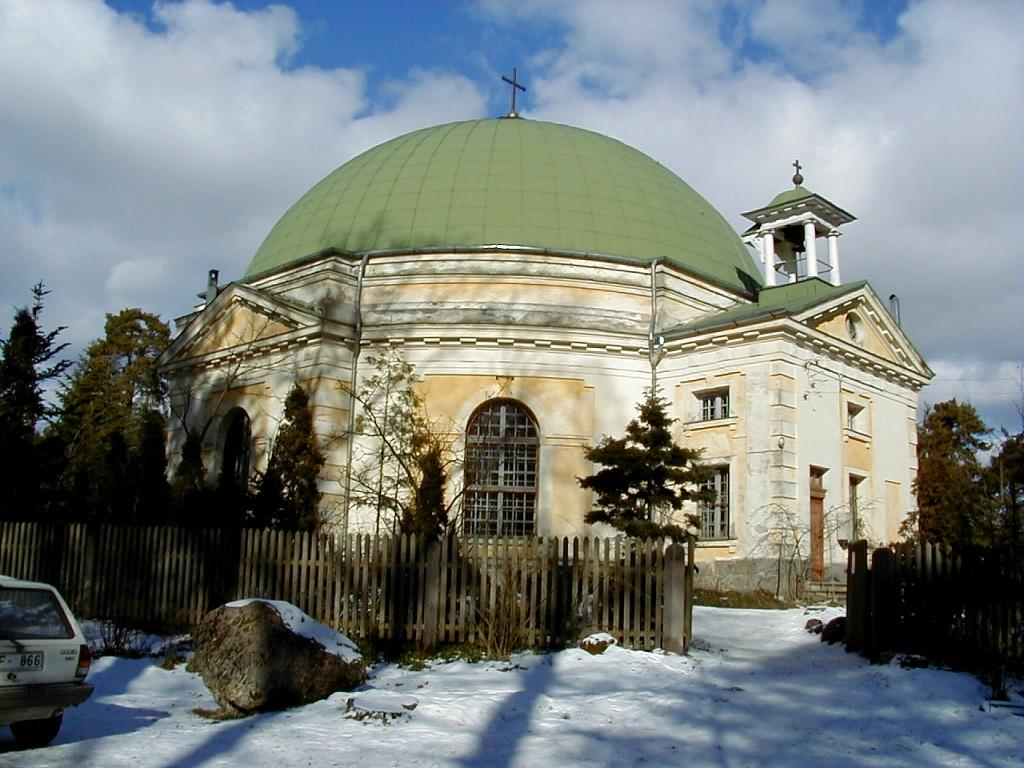
Katlakalna Lutheran Church near Riga.

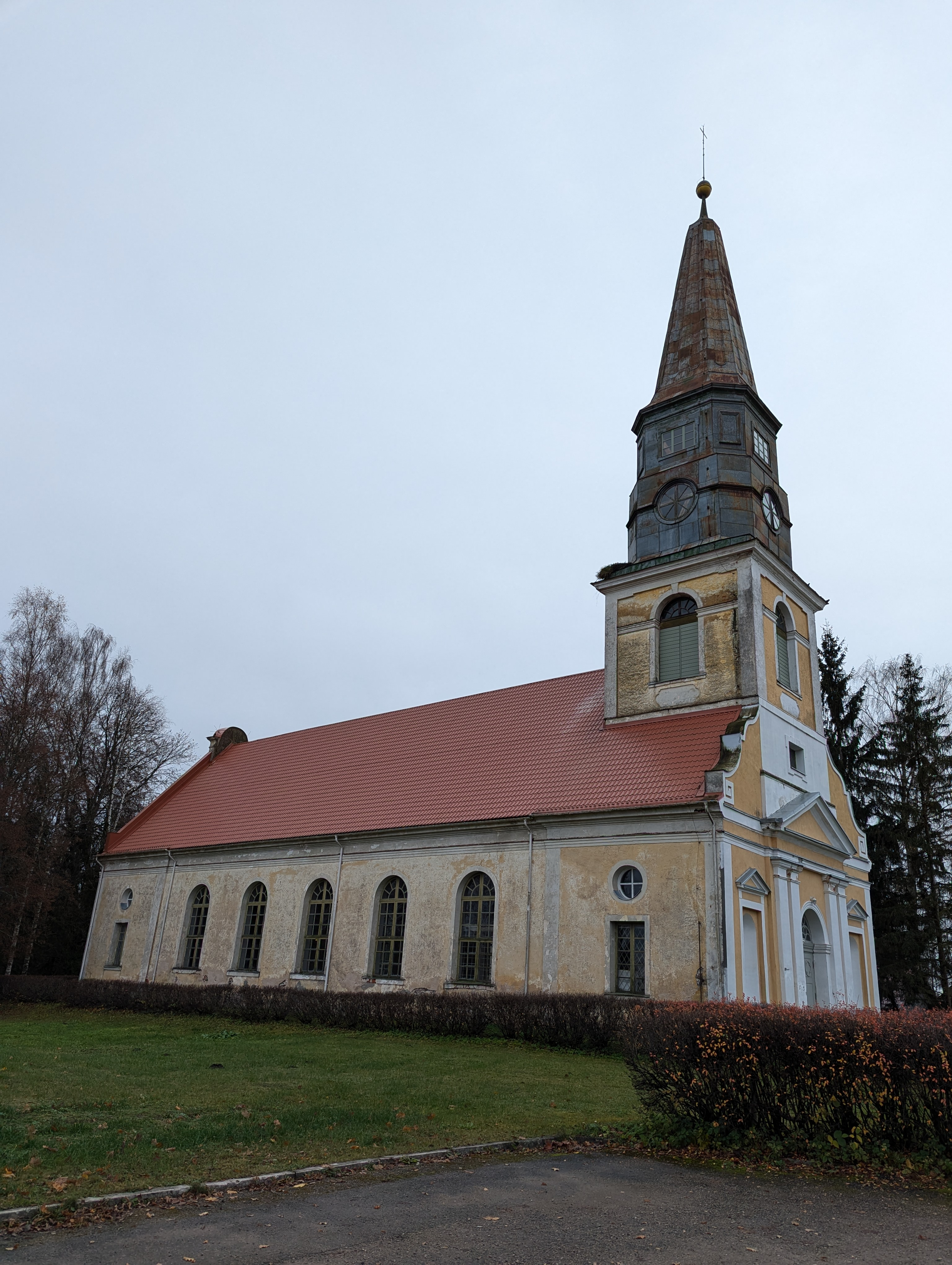
Lutheran church in Suntaži

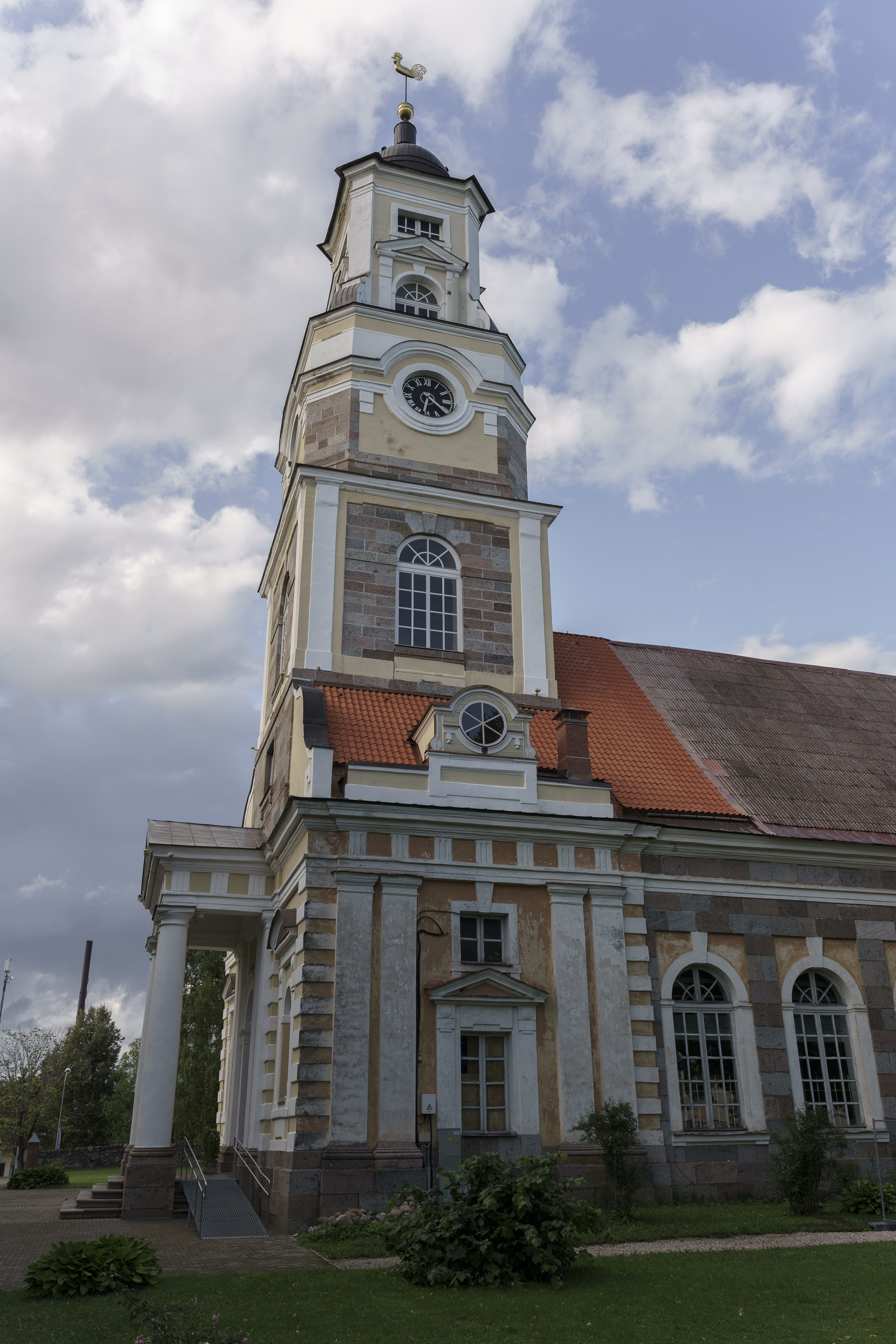
Lutheran church in Alūksne.

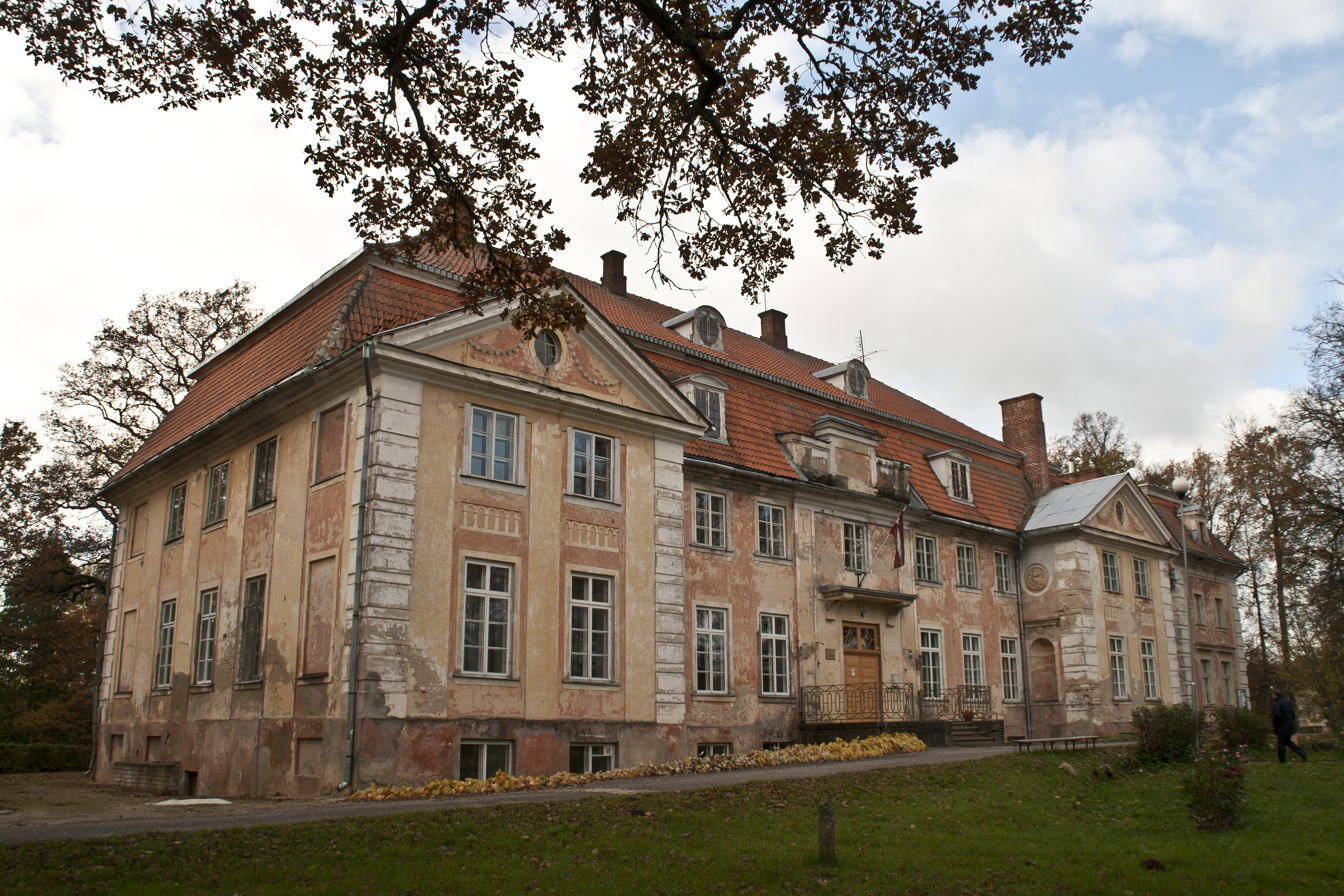
Ozolmuiža manor house Brīvzemnieki parish.

== See also ==
- List of Baltic German architects
