= Pokrov Cemetery =

Cemetery in Riga, Latvia

Pokrov Cemetery Pokrova kapi
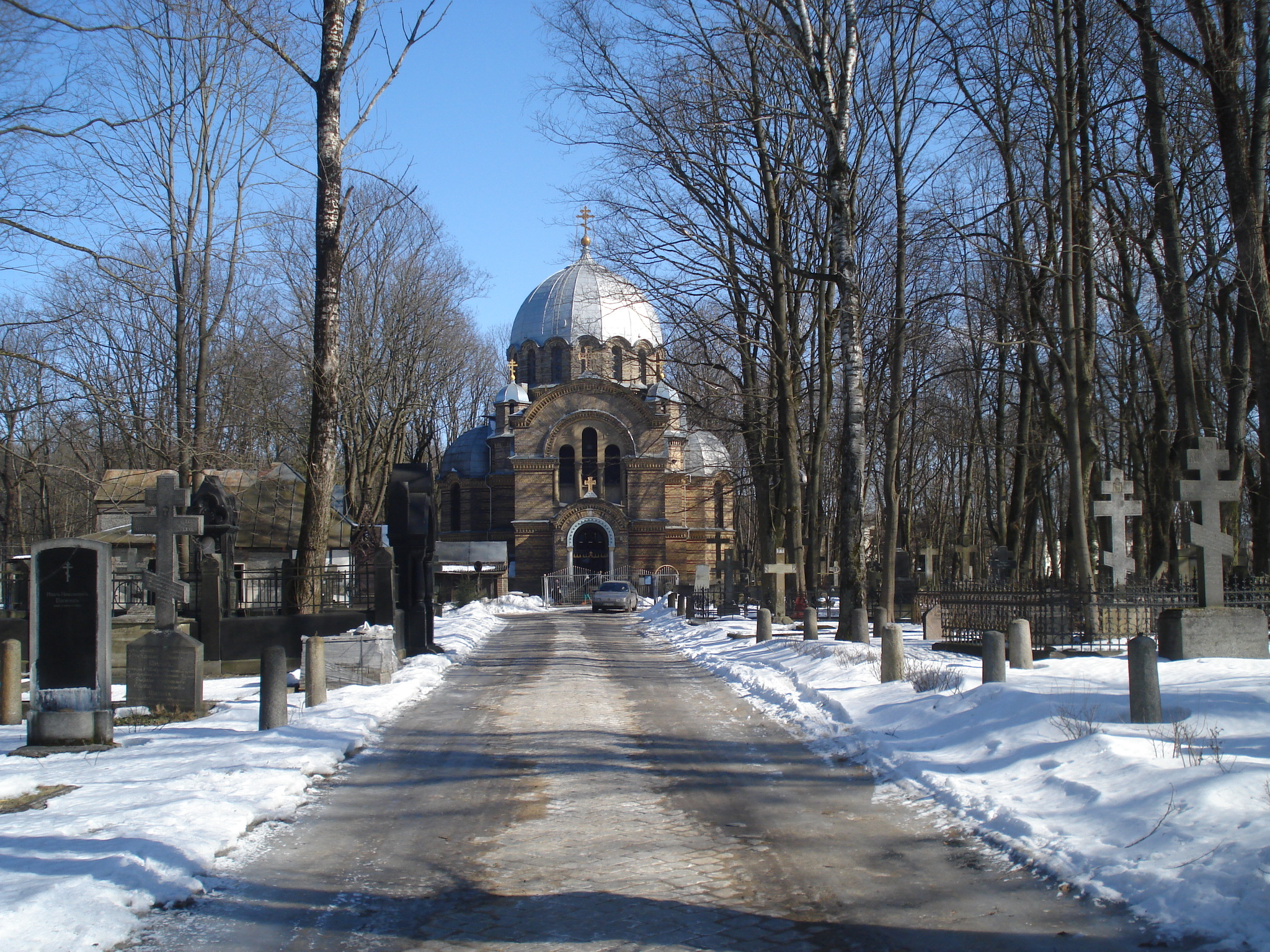
- General view, in the background a cemetery church of the Protection of the Holy Mother
- Interactive map of Pokrov Cemetery; Pokrova kapi

Details
- Established: 1773
- Location: Riga
- Country: Latvia
- Coordinates: 56°58′05″N 24°08′24″E
- Type: public
- Owned by: Shelter of Our Most Holy Lady Church
- Size: 70,669 square metres (760,670 sq ft)
- Website: http://www.pokrovskoe.lv/
- Find a Grave: Pokrov Cemetery; Pokrova kapi

Pokrov Cemetery (Latvian: Pokrova kapi) is a 70,669 square metres (760,670 sq ft) wide cemetery in Riga built in 1773. The current owner of the cemetery is Shelter of Our Most Holy Lady Church who are renting the land.

Two Red Army burial sites are located in the cemetery – a smaller one for the summer of 1941 and a bigger one for the years 1944–1946; as well as Russian Empire army's bed of honour dating from 1917.

The cemetery also houses Ascension of Christ Church; the only Latvian Orthodox church in Riga where sermons are held in Latvian.

== History ==
The cemetery was built in 1773 following the Russian Empire's prohibition of burials within city territories. Together with Vagaņka and Novodevičja cemeteries, Pokrov Cemetery was among Russian Empire's largest five cemeteries. In 1773 a wooden Proclamation Chapel was built, and in 1777 under Pskov's archbishop's order Pokrov church was built, which burnt down in 1875. On April 29, 1845, the first sermon in Latvian was held by priest Jēkabs Mihailovs, former domain factor of Piebalga's count Šeremetjevs. In 1858 Latvian congregation was established in the church. The current church was built in 1879 designed by architect R. Pflūgs, and sanctified on September 9, 1879.

Pokrov Cemetery became Riga's Russian community's main cemetery. The base of this commune had been established from centuries of Russian families living in the land, as well as cultural workers and scientists escaping the USSR in the early half of the 20th century. The members of the community held the cemetery in high standing, for example, the former writer and commandant of Daugavgrīva stronghold Jurijs Gončarenko-Galičs secured himself a spot in the cemetery before shooting himself knowing that after Soviet occupation he would be harshly prosecuted.

The burials were suspended in 1964, and in 1967 the cemetery was administratively joined with Great Cemetery of Riga to establish a memorial park. In 1991, the ownership over the cemetery was restored to Latvian Orthodox Church, who restored the cemetery operation.

== Notable interments ==
A number of notable citizens of Riga are buried here, such as archbishop of Riga Jānis Pommers, metropolitan of Vilnius and Lithuania Sergejs (Voskresenskis), poet O. Šmidta, teacher F. Erns, magistrate N. Eše, literature critic P. Piļskis, state councillor V. Juzepčuks, governor of Riga A. Beklešovs, professor V. Černobajevs, primadonna of Mariinsky Theatre M. Čerkaska, augur Eižens Finks, infantry general A. Simonovs, actor V. Svobodins, Saint Petersburg opera soloist D. Smirnovs, writer Aleksey Tolstoy's wife J. Rožanska, Russian First journalism school principal P. Piļskis, bibliographer S. Minclovs, Check assassinated literate and newspaper Segodnya ("Сегодня" from Russian: "Today") editor M. Ganfmans, state councillor K. Kuzjmanovs, poet Leri (V. Klopotovskis), professor V. Kļimenko, Order of the Three Stars cavalier and professor G. Klarks, knyaz P. Jengaličevs, painter Sergejs Vinogradovs, artist K. Visockis, publisher N. Belocvetovs, professor K. Arabažins, actor J. de Burs, philosopher Žakovs, private assistant professor J. Bērziņš, pharmacologist A. Pauls, biologist Kārlis Reinholds Kupfers, actress Vija Artmane. Here are also located the burials of Mukhins (such as world-known sculptor Vera Mukhina) and Vērmanes Garden patron Wöhrmann family graves.

== See also ==
- List of cemeteries in Latvia

== Bibliography ==
- Покровское кладбище. Слава и забвение: Сборник статей / Сост. С. Видякина, С. Ковальчук. Multicentrs: Рига, 2004 – 312 с.
- Kalistrata Žakova Rīgas arhīvs. // Religiski-filozofiski raksti. Latvijas Universitātes Filozofijas un socioloģijas institūts: Rīga, IX/2005.
