= Forest Cemetery, Riga =

Cemetery in Riga, Latvia

Coordinates: 56°59′14.57″N 24°8′48.97″E

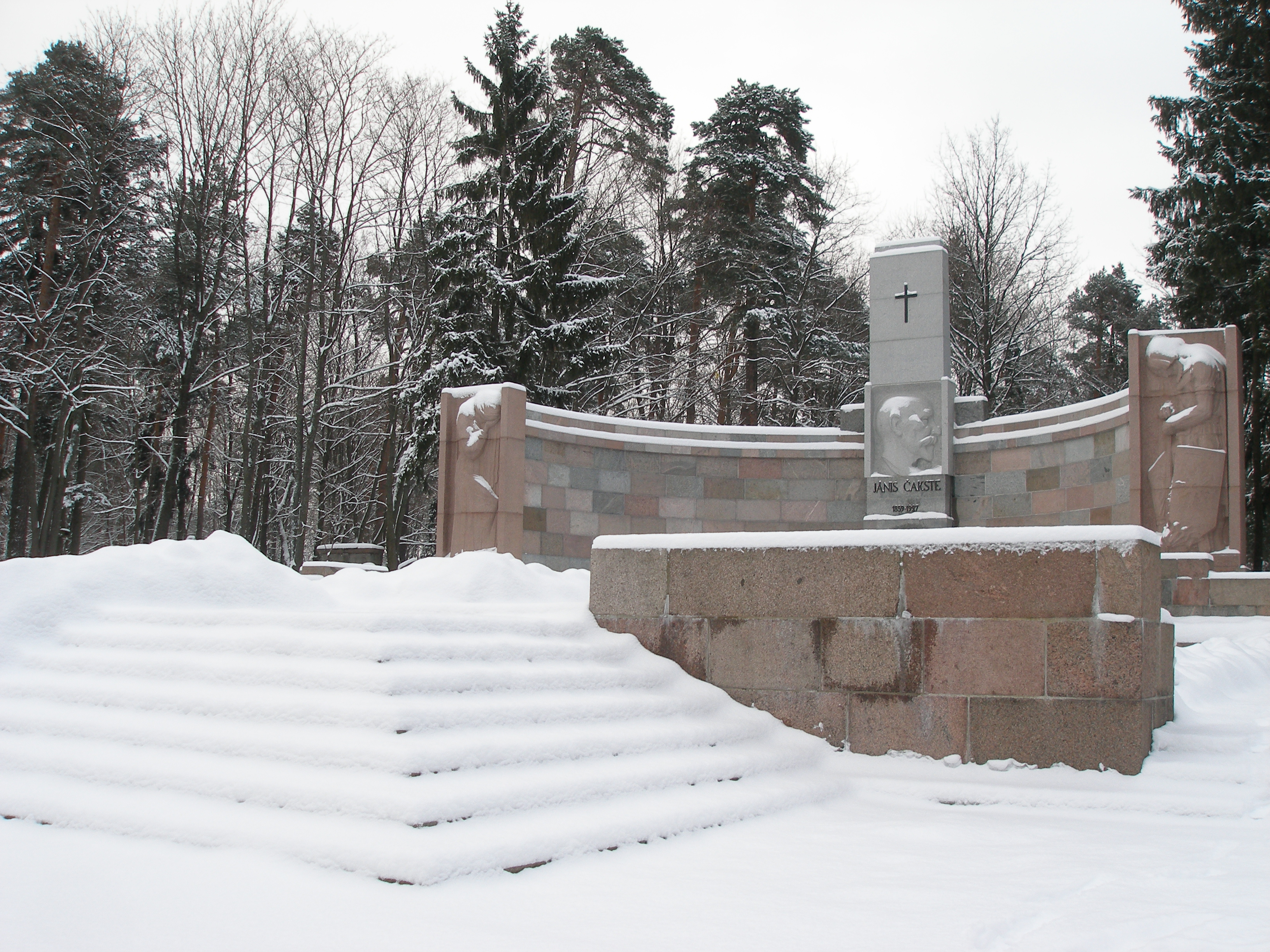
Jānis Čakste Memorial and burial site at the Forest Cemetery

Forest Cemetery (Latvian: Rīgas Meža kapi) is an 85 hectares (210 acres) large cemetery in the northwestern part of Riga, the capital of Latvia, between the neighbourhoods of Mežaparks and Čiekurkalns. Formally, the cemetery is divided between 1st Forest Cemetery, with entrance from Aizsaules Street, and 2nd Forest Cemetery, with entrance from Gaujas Street.

In 1904, German Lutheran congregations in Riga inquired the Riga City Council for allotment of land for a cemetery in the Mežaparks neighbourhood. It was planned to become a new large cemetery after the Great Cemetery, that was established 1773 in Riga and had exhausted its potential. The prominent Baltic-German landscape architect Georg Kuphaldt was author of the original construction project presented 1908, which should have appeared as a park with a central via funeralis, with many small and lateral paths along the graves with low fences and small monuments. The Forest Cemetery was established 29 July 1910 following a decision made by the 3rd Imperial Duma, and it was inaugurated 19 June 1913.

All burial ceremonies were conducted in a building erected 1913 after blueprints by the Baltic-German architect Wilhelm Neumann.

During World War I, when the front closed in on Riga in 1916, the Forest Cemetery was receiving many fallen Latvian Riflemen. After a lengthy debate with local congregations, the Imperial Duma sanctioned the construction of a military cemetery, on land transferred from the Forest Cemetery, a cemetery that later was named Brothers' Cemetery.

The Forest Cemetery has many sculptural memorials and tombstones created by notable sculptors. Many notable Latvian politicians, military, and public figures are buried at the Forest Cemetery.

== See also ==
- List of cemeteries in Latvia
