= Brothers' Cemetery =

Cemetery in Riga, Latvia

Brothers' Cemetery Brāļu Kapi
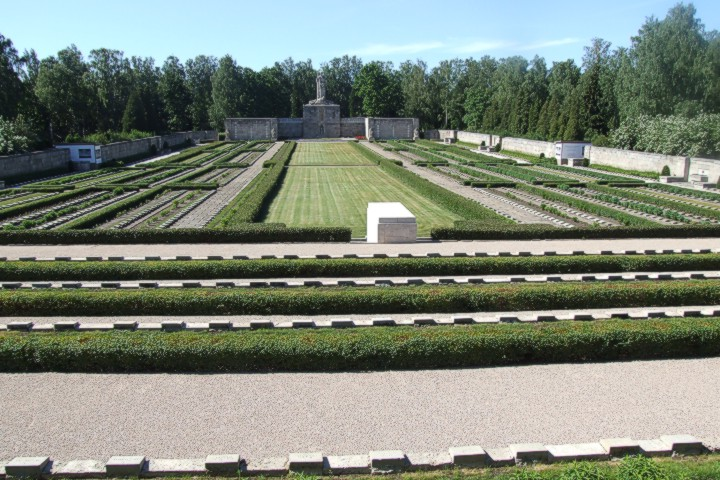
- The main burial ground of the cemetery
- Interactive map of Brothers' Cemetery; Brāļu Kapi

Details
- Established: 1915
- Location: Riga
- Country: Latvia
- Coordinates: 56°59′20″N 24°08′34″E
- Type: public
- Size: ~9 hectares
- No. of graves: >2800
- Find a Grave: Brothers' Cemetery; Brāļu Kapi

Brothers' Cemetery or Cemetery of the Brethren (Latvian: Brāļu Kapi), also sometimes referred to in English as the Common Graves or simply as the Military Cemetery, is a military cemetery and national monument in Riga, capital of Latvia.

The cemetery is a memorial to and burial ground for thousands of Latvian soldiers who were killed between 1915 and 1920 in World War I and the Latvian War of Independence.

The landscape was designed by gardener Andrejs Zeidaks, who started to work on it already during the war. The memorial was built between 1924 and 1936, to designs by the sculptor Kārlis Zāle, many of whose sculptures feature prominently, the architects Pēteris Feders, Aleksandrs Birzenieks, P. Kundziņš, the sculptors J. Cirulis and F. Valdmanis and others.

== History ==
In 1913 the Forest Cemetery was opened. In 1914 Riga Cathedral and St. Peter's church set aside a parcel of land for 146 burials of soldiers who did not belong to any congregation of Riga in the part of the cemetery intended for the dead from their congregations. The first soldiers buried there, on 15 October 1915, were Andrejs Stūris, Jonas Gavenas and Jēkabs Voldemārs Timma. As the war continued it became clear that land for more burials would be needed. The organization committee of Latvian Riflemen battalions turned to the churches for more land, but the request was denied. The committee then turned to Riga City Council, which had allotted the land for cemetery, arguing that reasons for refusal the churches had named were questionable and unreasonable in the time of war. The conflict was ultimately solved in 1916 by the churches agreeing to return part of the land to the city for formation of a separate cemetery, which in turn allotted it to the committee. The initial outlay of the cemetery was designed by Andrejs Zeidaks, then the head gardener of the city. In 1920 a committee for overseeing cemeteries and battlefields from World War I was formed, which became responsible for the development of the Brothers' Cemetery. The development of the memorial can thus be roughly divided into two periods. First was the period of landscape development, which lasted until 1923, when the landscaping was developed according to Zeidaks' ideas. Meanwhile, the architectonic and artistic development of the cemetery was being discussed. In 1921 and in 1922 two closed design contests took place. The sculptor Kārlis Zāle, who was visiting Riga to participate in the design contest for the Freedom Monument, was invited to take part in the second contest for the cemetery as well. He won, and the second phase of development began, which lasted until 1936. In this period the landscaping was supplemented by architectonic and sculptural elements to form a unified ensemble in accordance with Zāle's design. The architectural works were directed by P. Feders; the architect A. Birznieks and the sculptors M. Šmalcs, N. Maulics and P. Banders were also involved.

The foundation stone of the memorial was laid on 18 November 1924. The first sculptural group, of dying horsemen, was unveiled on 20 November 1927, the second on 2 September 1928. The sculpture of Mother Latvia and her dead sons was unveiled on 13 October 1929. Construction of the main gates began in 1930. Statues of soldiers with shields symbolizing the four regions of Latvia were carved later. In 1936 the coats of arms of the 19 districts and the 59 cities of Latvia were carved in the wall of the cemetery. The cemetery was formally dedicated as a memorial on 11 November 1936 in the presence of the President of Latvia and the government.

== Design ==
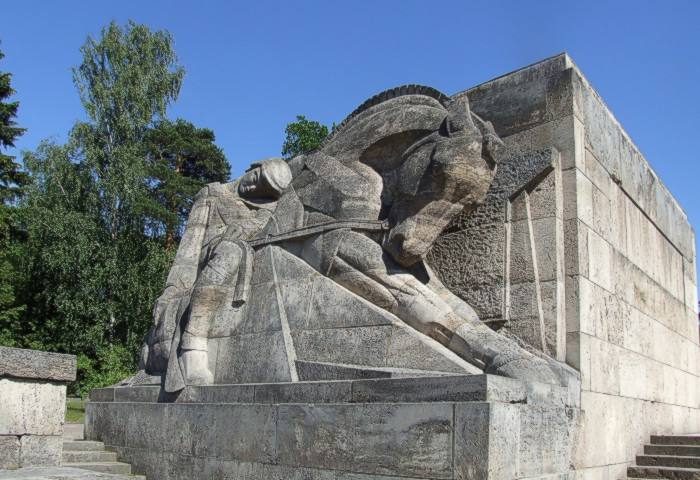
Sculpture of a horseman

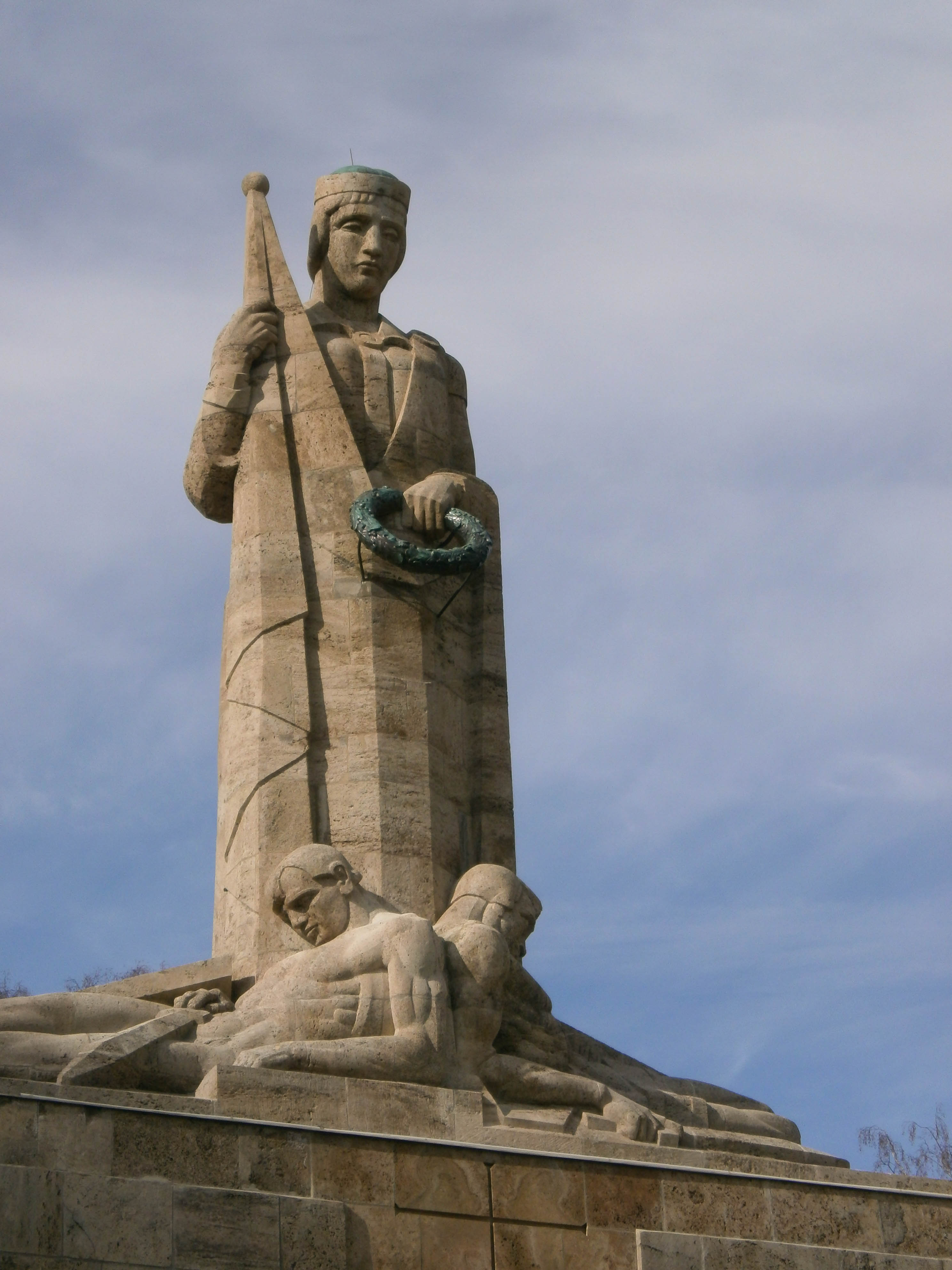
Sculpture at Brāļu Kapi

The cemetery consists of an area of 9 hectares in northeastern Riga, 5 kilometers from the city center. It borders the First Forest Cemetery and Rainis Cemetery. The memorial expresses national gratitude to the fallen heroes through cultural references to the Latvian nation. The main gate of the cemetery is 10 meters high and 32 meters wide. To either side of the entrance, on 2 meter high platforms are 3.3 meters high sculptures each representing a pair of ancient Latvian horsemen. The riders and horses in the right hand sculptural group have straight stances; one of the horses has its head thrown back, and upward movement dominates in the group. This is in contrast to the left hand group, which is dominated by downward movement as expressed through the bowed heads of the riders and horses; the riders have lowered their shields and the flags they are carrying. Above the entrance the dates 1915 (when the first burials in the cemetery were made) and 1920 (the last year of the Latvian War of Independence) are displayed; between the two dates the gate is decorated with the coat of arms of Latvia. From the main entrance the 205 meters long Road of Thoughts leads through an avenue of linden trees to the Terrace of Heroes, encircled by an oak grove planted in 1923. The terrace, paved with slabs of tufa, is about 73 meters wide and 78 meters long; in its center is placed the 1 meter high altar of sacred fire. In the 1930s a sacred fire was lit on it on important holidays. It was later redesigned as a gas-fed eternal flame. As the Terrace of Heroes rises above the Road of Thoughts it hides from sight the central burial ground, which is on a lower level than the Road of Thoughts, until one has crossed the terrace, which thus provides a panorama of the burial ground and forms a barrier between the worlds of the living and of the dead. There is a parapet with flower altar on edge of the Terrace facing the burial ground. At the outer end of the burial ground on 9 meters high base, which makes it visible from main entrance 457 meters away, there is a 10 meters high sculpture of grieving mother Latvia and her dead sons. The mother, dressed in stylized national costume, is holding a victory wreath of oak leaves made of bronze in her left hand and the national flag with the right hand. At her feet her fallen sons are lying under their shields, both holding swords in their hands. In the wall under the sculpture a cross is carved and there is a niche with a tray holding soil from 517 parishes of Latvia. This central group is sided by two 1.8 meters high sculptures of ancient Latvian warriors standing on 1.2 meters high bases, who symbolize the Regions of Latvia as they are bearing regional coats of arms on their shields - the two warriors to left symbolize Courland and Semigalia, while the two on right - Vidzeme and Latgale. The main burial ground is rectangular and encircled by walls. At the end closer to main entrance in the corners of the main burial field there are 3.6 meters high sculptures of wounded horsemen. Next to each sculpture there are staircases leading towards the outside of cemetery. Between the main burial ground and the Terrace of Heroes there is another, lower terrace with burials. At the bottom of the terrace on the main burial grounds there is Alto-relievo Fallen brothers. The graves on the burial ground are ordered in lines and there is hedge between each two lines. The grave markers are tufa or concrete slabs on them the name, surname, rank and lifetime of the fallen, or "unknown" (Latvian, nezinams) is written. The wall is decorated with coats of arms of cities and districts of Latvia. There are additional burial grounds to the left of main burial ground when looking from main entrance.

== Burials ==
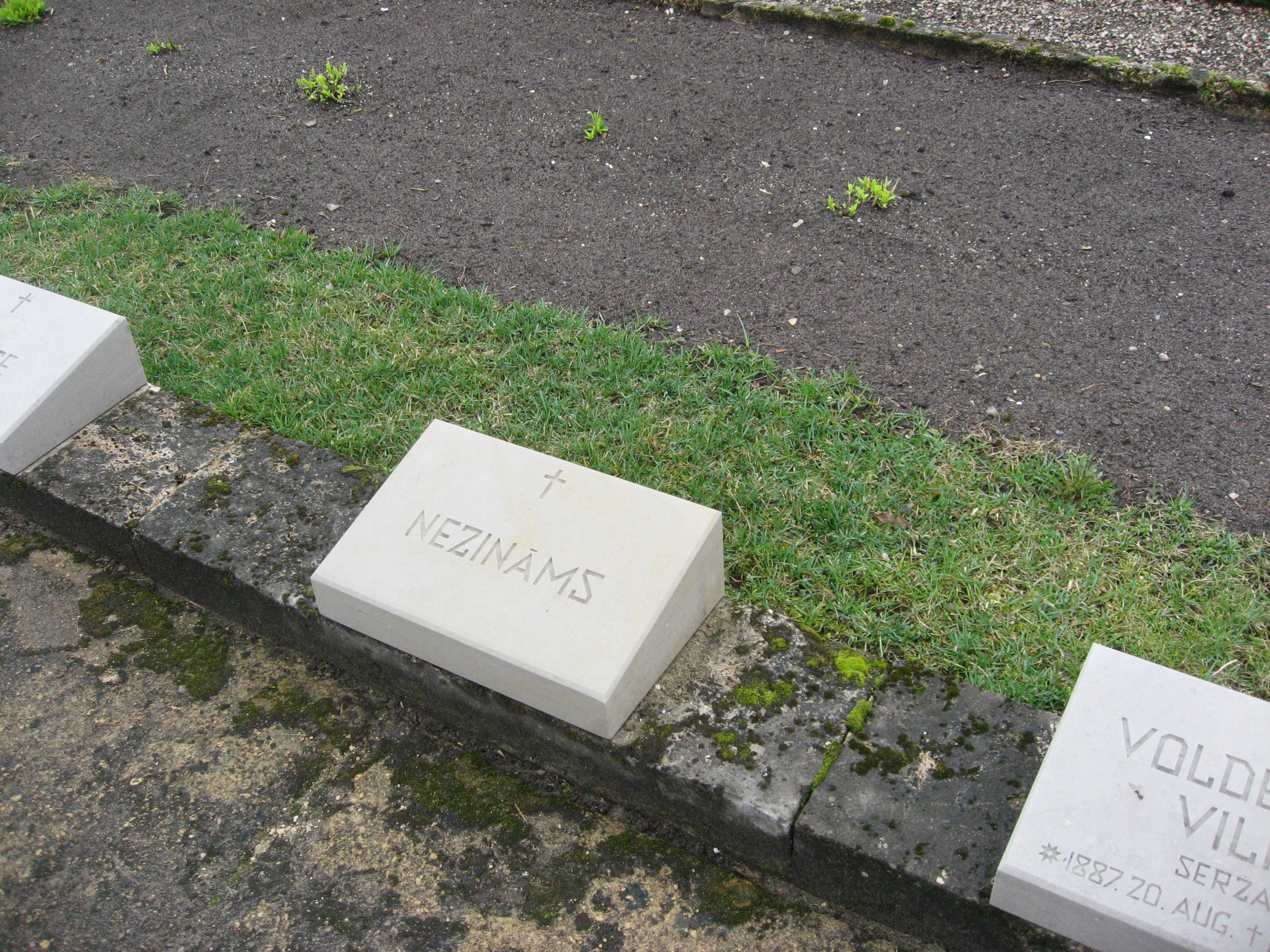
A grave marker marking grave of an unknown soldier; about 200 of soldiers buried in the cemetery were never identified

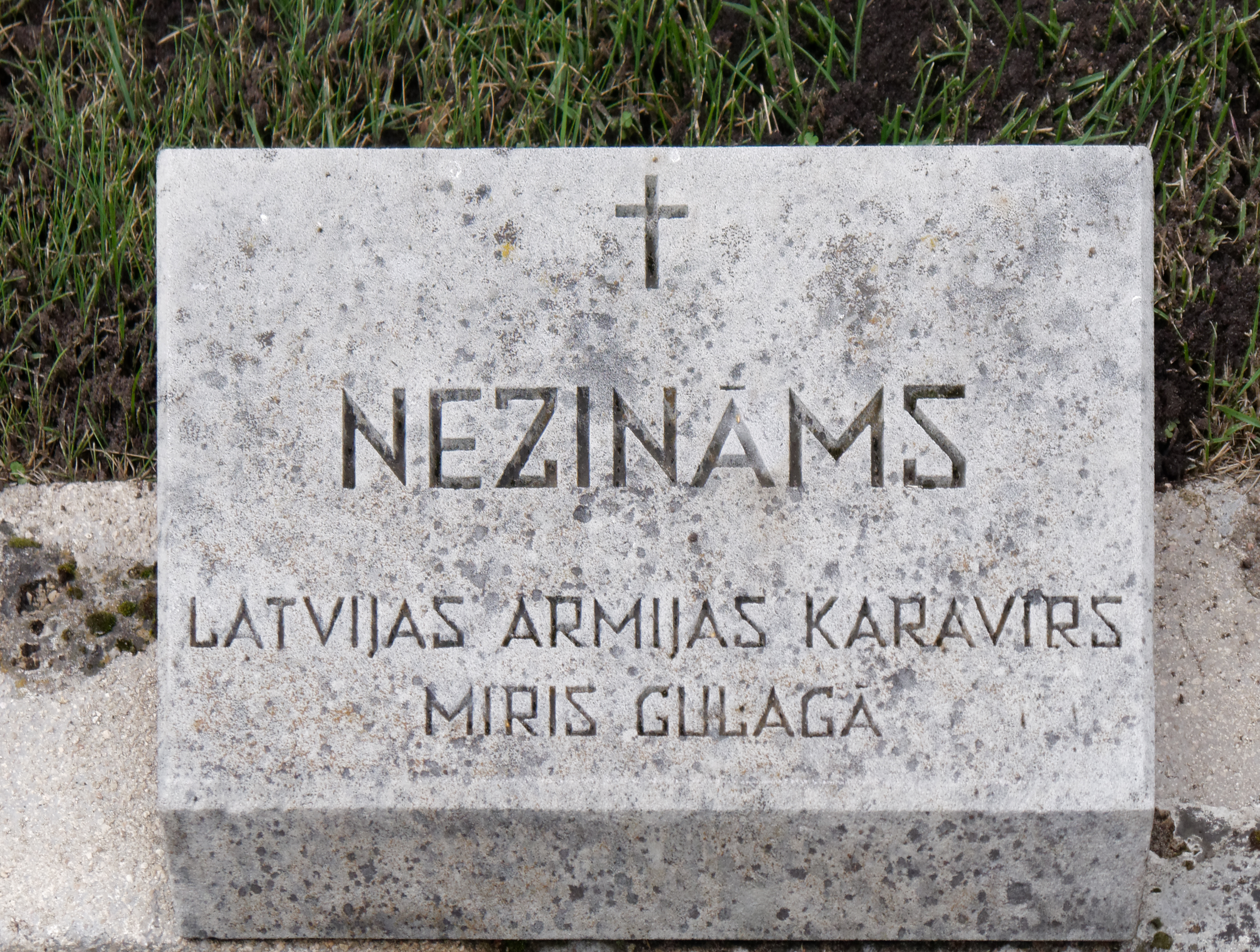
The plaque reads "Unknown soldier of the Latvian Army, died in the Gulag"

The cemetery contains more than 2,000 burials, mostly of soldiers who were killed between 1915 and 1920 in World War I and the Latvian War of Independence. It also contains a number of graves, including reburials, of Latvians killed during World War II and of holders of the Lāčplēsis War Order (Latvian: Lāčplēša Kara ordenis), awarded for extraordinary merit during the Latvian War of Independence. Also many Latvian Rifleman veterans were buried in the cemetery it was practiced even under Soviet rule.

== See also ==
- Great Cemetery Riga
- Kārlis Zāle
- Latvian War of Independence
- Freedom Monument
- List of cemeteries in Latvia
