= Ozolmuiža Manor =

Manor house in Latvia

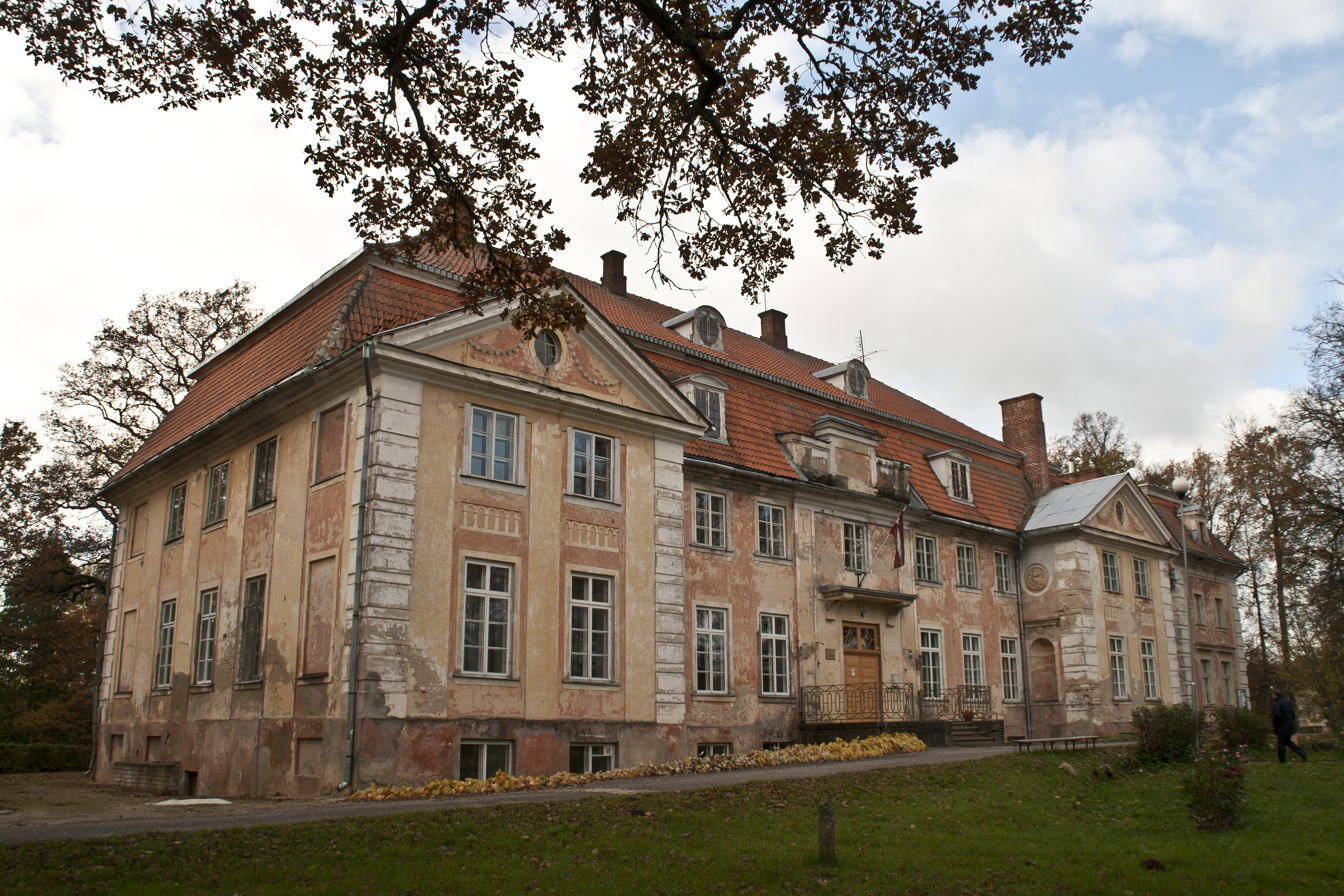

- Location within Latvia

General information
- Location: Brīvzemnieki Parish, Limbaži Municipality, Vidzeme, Ozolmuiža, Brīvzemnieki Parish, LV-4063, Latvia, Latvia
- Coordinates: 57°38′14″N 25°02′50″E

Ozolmuiža Manor (Latvian: Ozolmuižas kungu māja, German: Gut Lappier) is an Early Classicism style manor house built for Count George Johann von Mellin at the end of the 18th century in Brīvzemnieki Parish, Limbaži Municipality, in the Vidzeme region of Latvia.

== History ==
Ozolmuiža Manor was a knight's manor (fideicommiss) in Livonia, Kreis Wolmar, Dikļi parish. It is currently located in the village of Ozolmuiža in Limbaži Municipality, Latvia. The first records indicate that in 1334 Korff became manor owner. Originally it was side manor of the Carlsberg Manor. Heinrich Korwen inherited it from the House of Ungern-Sternberg. In 1521, Heinrich von Ungern sold the manor to his sisters for 6,000 marks. In 1542 manors were divided and Ozoli got the children of his married sister Elisabeth, by name Rosenid. Of these sons, only Kersten survived the manor, who also bequeathed it to his son Jürgen. His daughter Gertrud took possession of the manor by von Mengden in 1648.

From 1782 until Latvian agrarian reforms of from 1920s manor belonged to the Mellin family. Manor housed the Ozoli agricultural school after 1952. Since 1993 the building has housed the Ozolmuiža primary school.

=== Manor estate ===
According to Herbord Karl Friedrich Bienemann von Bienenstamm, the size of the manor in 1816 was 12 and 5/6 adramaa, with 258 male and 273 female souls. In 1641 the size of the manor was 1 and 1/2 plots of land, together with the Carlsberg cattle manor 3 and 1/2 plots of land. In 1688 the size of the manor was nine adrams, in 1734 there were adrams 7 and 7/8, in 1757 there were 12 and 5/8. In 1823 the manor was 11 and 13/20 in size. In 1832 the manor had 11 and 13/20 adramas, in 1881 5 and 10/80, in addition 13 and 30/80 adramas were in the possession of the manor farms.

=== Manor herds ===
In 1816 the manor owned two herd manors: "Carlsberg" and "Koskullshof". Carlsberg was the property of an old Koskull clan, whose side manors were both Budenbroka manor and Ozoli manor; perhaps also Dikļi Manor. In 1334 it was bought by Gerhard von Ungern, later when the Ungerns also acquired Ozol, Carlsberg became a side manor and later a cattle manor.

The Koskullshof was originally a side estate of Carlsberg, also called Seckendorf, but when the Koskulls sold Carlsberg to the Ungerns, it remained their only possession in the area. In 1448 they sold the manor to the Krüdener for 6100 marks. It was acquired from the Krüdener by Engelbrecht von Ungern, who sold it to Jürgen Gutzleff in 1499. It was later owned by Friedrich von Ranitz and Bartholomäus Patkul Ķieģeļi Manor. In 1598, the manor was bought by Heinrich Tiesenhausen from Konguta vassal castle for 6000 Red złoty. In 1625 the manor became the property of Olof Jacobson Gulbo and Martin Paul. It was acquired from them by their stepbrother Dietrich Baykull. Anna, the widow of her son George, sold the manor to the Ozoli Mengden in 1688, after which the estate also became a cattle manor.

== Manor ensemble ==
=== Mansion ===
The main building was built at the end of the 18th century, when the manor was owned by Georg Johann von Mellin. The main building is in a classicist style, and stucco has been used extensively in its decoration. Most of the outbuildings are around the main building, a few storehouse and sauna away from the lake. Next to the main building is a regular park, which was also built in the 18th century. Both the main building and the park are cultural monuments under state protection. Five other furnaces, two ceilings and one hall interior of this manor are under state protection as art monuments.

=== Manor Park ===
Twelve Ozolmuiža alley linden trees, twenty Ozolmuiža oaks, Ozolmuiža islands, Ozolmuiža arable tree, Ozolmuiža larch, Ozolmuiža pine and Jaanitule aseme larch grow under nature protection near the manor.

== See also ==
- List of palaces and manor houses in Latvia
