= Puikule Manor =

Manor house in Latvia

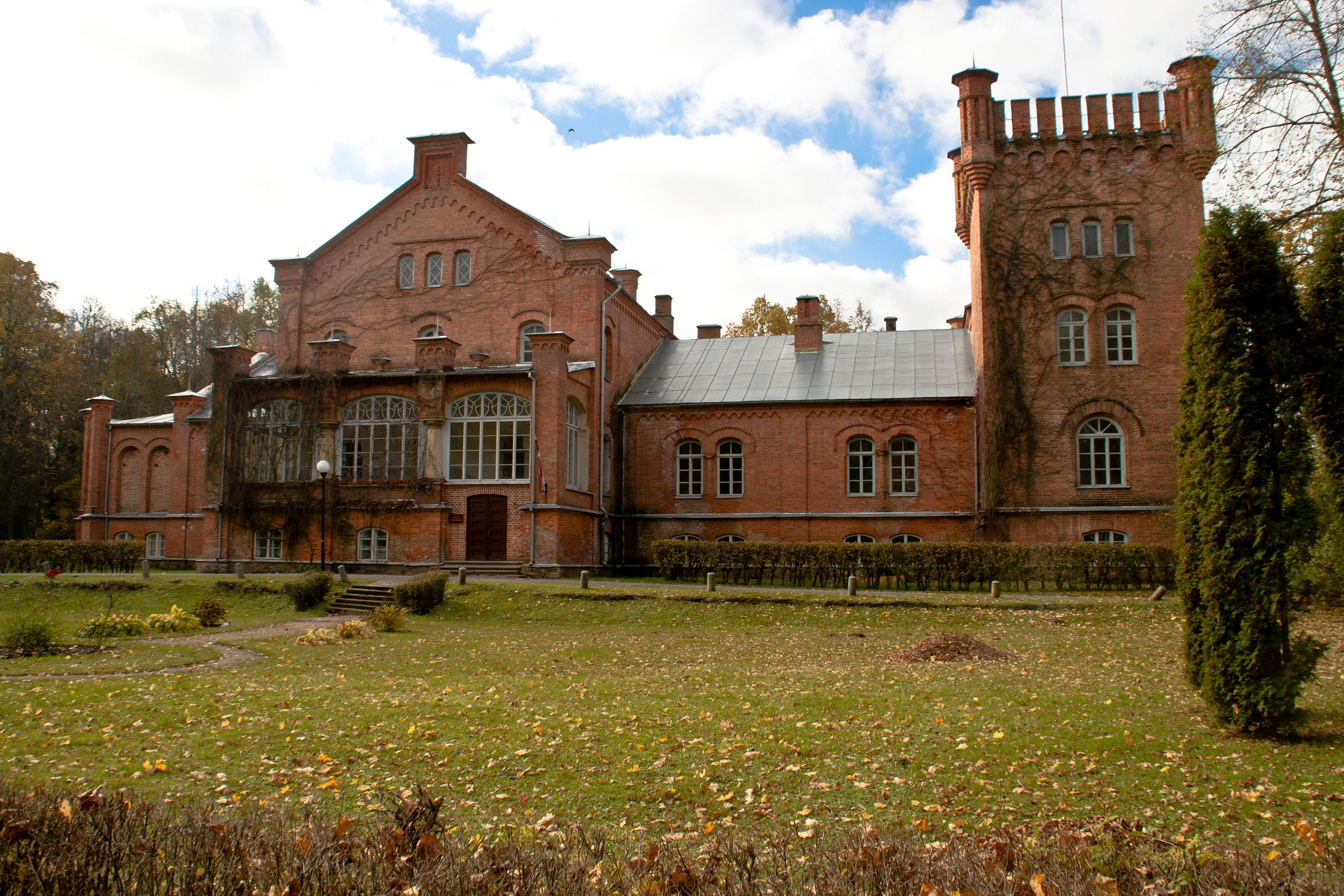

- Location within Latvia

General information
- Location: Brīvzemnieki Parish, Limbaži Municipality, Vidzeme, Latvia
- Coordinates: 57°41′18″N 24°52′56″E

Puikule Manor (Latvian: Puikules muiža pils) is a manor house in Brīvzemnieki Parish, Limbaži Municipality the historical region of Vidzeme, in northern Latvia. Built in Tudor Neo-Gothic style in the 1870s, it now houses the Puikule primary school.

== See also ==
- List of palaces and manor houses in Latvia
