= List of cemeteries in Latvia =

This is a list of cemeteries in Latvia.

== Riga ==
- Bikernieki Memorial
- Brothers' Cemetery
- Forest Cemetery
- Great Cemetery
- Martin Cemetery (Mārtiņa kapi), Riga
- Pokrov Cemetery
