= Church of the Intercession (Novocherkassk) =

Church in Rostov Oblast, Russia

Church of the Intercession of the Holy Virgin
- Церковь Покрова Пресвятой Богородицы
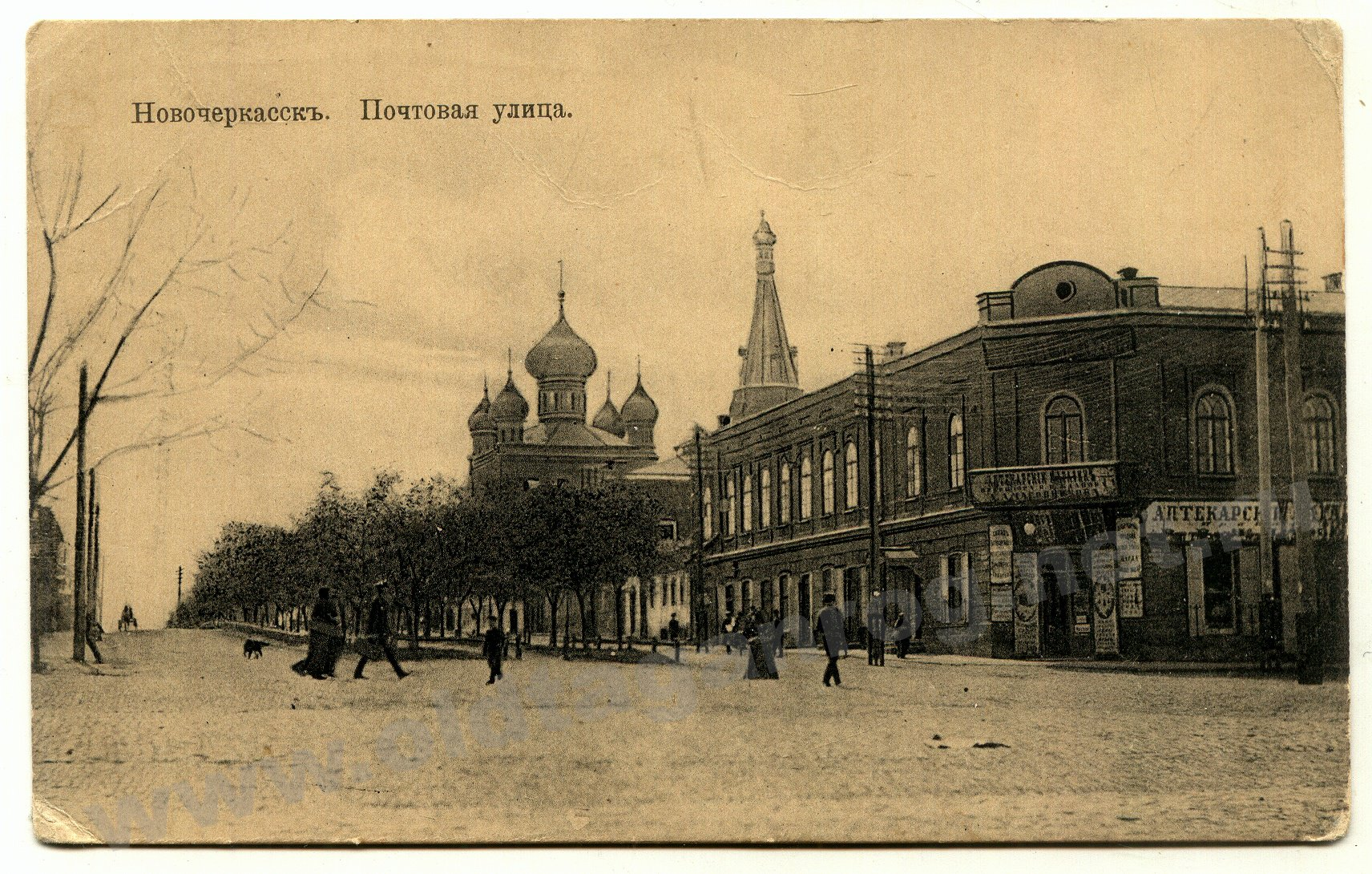
- The church pictured at a postcard, the beginning of the 20th century
- Church of the Intercession of the Holy Virgin
- 47.4079°N 40.0975°E
- Location: Novocherkassk, Rostov Oblast, Russia
- Country: Russia
- Denomination: Old Believers

History
- Status: Parish church
- Dedication: Intercession of the Holy Virgin

Architecture
- Functional status: Destroyed
- Completed: 1908

The Church of the Intercession of the Holy Virgin (Russian: Церковь Покрова Пресвятой Богородицы) was an Old Believers church in Novocherkassk, Rostov Oblast, Russia. It was built in 1908 in Eclecticist style.

== History ==
At the beginning of the 20th century, after the promulgation of October Manifesto in 1905, which granted citizens of the Russian Empire freedom of conscience, the Old Believers of Novocherkassk decided to build their own church in the city. The law of 1906 on freedom of religion also eased their position.

Dmitry Fedorovich Baidalakov donated his farmstead with two stone houses on Pochtovaya Street for the construction of the new church, which was completed in 1907. The interior painting was carried out by artist Ivan Fyodorovich Popov, who also took part in the painting of Novocherkassk Cathedral.

After October Revolution the church was destroyed. On the very same Pochtovaya Street, at 300 meters from each other there were two St. Nicholas churches: an Orthodox one on Nikolskaya Square (now Levski Square), and an Old Believer one in the Alexander Garden. Both of them were also destroyed.

Photos

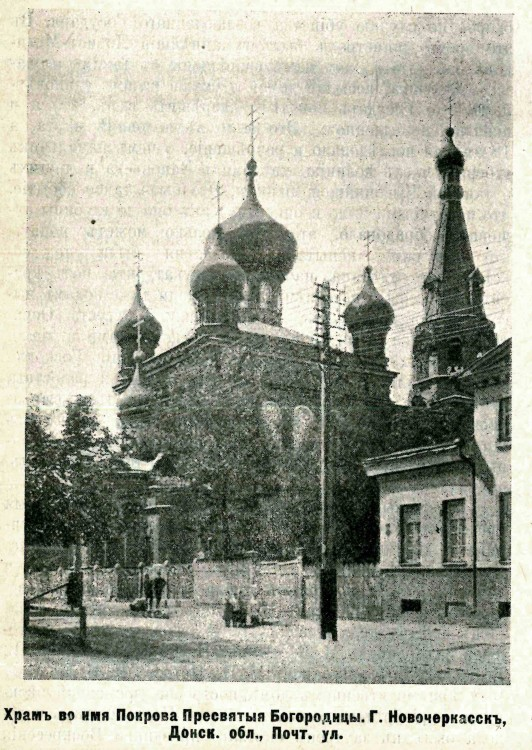
Exterior

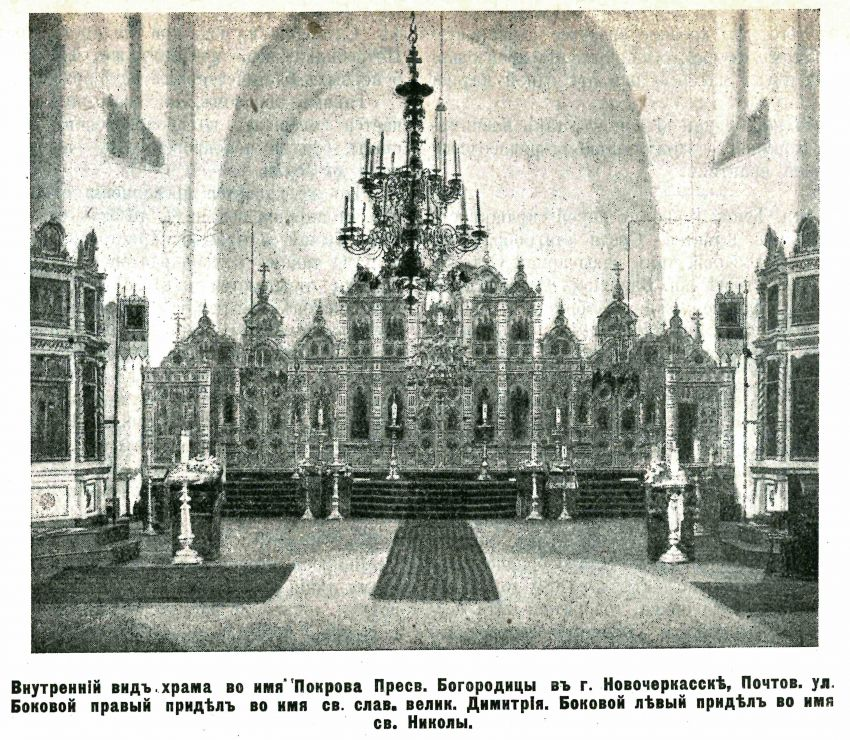
Interior
