= Church of the Intercession (Konstantinovsk) =

Church in Rostov Oblast, Russia

- Храм Покрова Пресвятой Богородицы
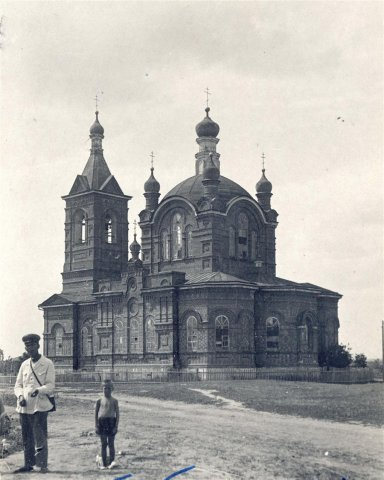
- The Church of the Intercession at the beginning of the 20th century
- Church of the Intercession
- Location: Rostov-on-Don, Rostov-on-Don, Russia
- Country: Russia
- Denomination: Russian Orthodox

History
- Status: Parish church

Architecture
- Architect: Pyotr Studenikin
- Completed: 1912

Administration
- Diocese: Diocese of Volgodonsk

The Church of the Intercession of the Holy Virgin (Russian: Храм Покрова Пресвятой Богородицы) is a Russian Orthodox church in Konstantinovsk, Rostov Oblast, Russia, that belongs to the Diocese of Volgodnosk and was built in 1912 on the project of architect Pyotr Studenikin.

== History ==
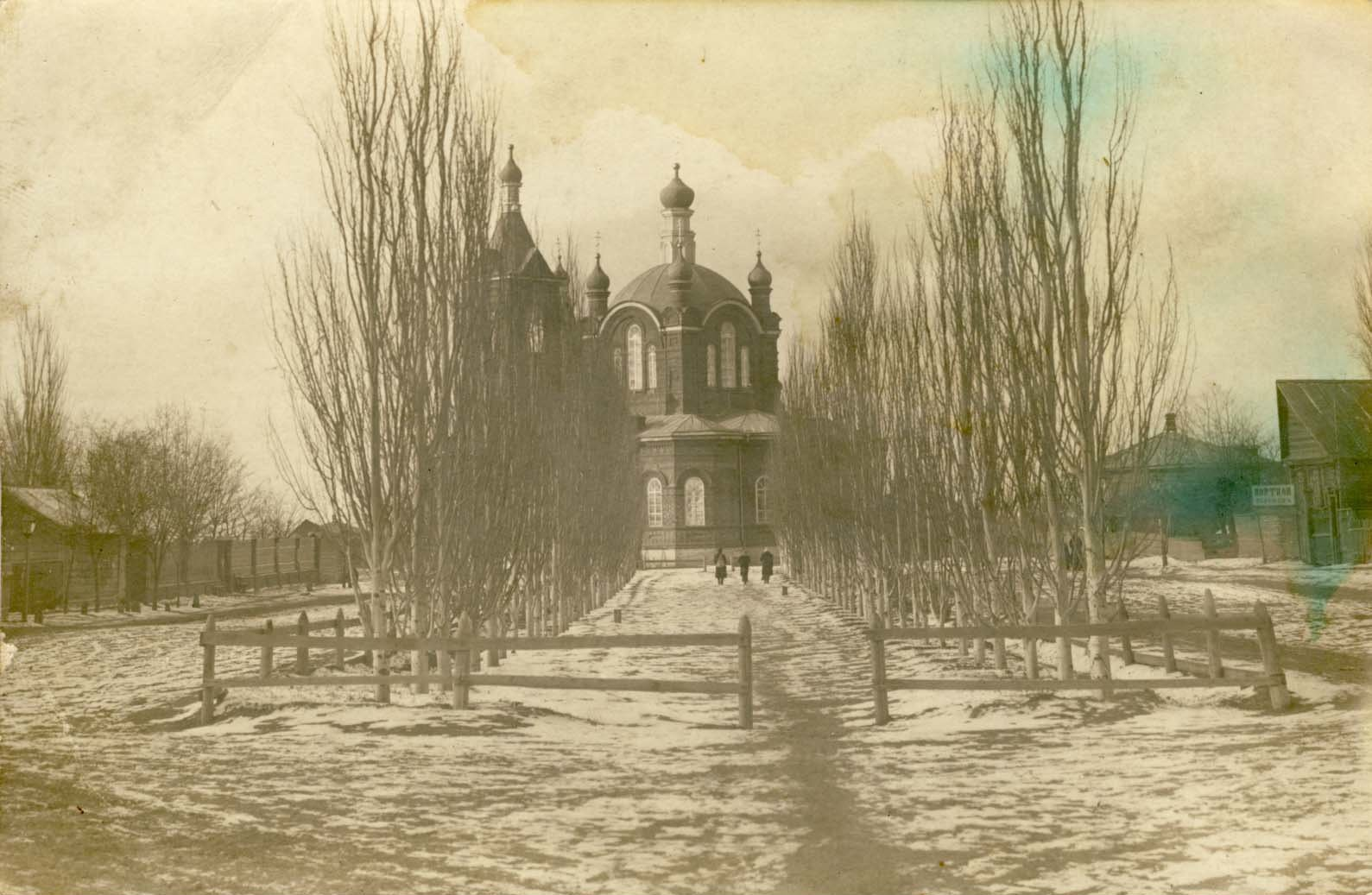
Church of the Intercession

The Church of the Intercession of the Holy Virgin began to be constructed in spring of 1907 on the project of architect Pyotr Studenikin. The building was completed in 1912.

In 1930 the church building was turned into a granary. During World War II, when Konstantinovsk was occupied by Wehrmacht forces, it was used as an ammunition depot. Soon it was handed over to the Orthodox community (which was officially registered in 1945) again. Liturgies continued to be held there until the late 1960s. In the early 1960s, the church was renovated with its interior being redecorated. Later, it was closed again and housed a gym which was functioning there until the late 1980s.

In 1988 the Church of the Intercession was transferred to the Russian Orthodox Church again and liturgies have been held there since then.

== Architecture ==
The Church of the Intercession is built in an Eclecticist style with Byzantine, Italian Renaissance and Russian Revival architecture elements being presented. The Intercession Church is built of bricks. The external brickwork of the walls is left unplastered, and that is an important element of the facade decoration. Today, the church is one of the highest buildings in Konstantinovsk, for the majority of town buildings only have one story.
