= Great Cemetery =

Cemetery in Riga, Latvia

- Latvian: Lielie kapi
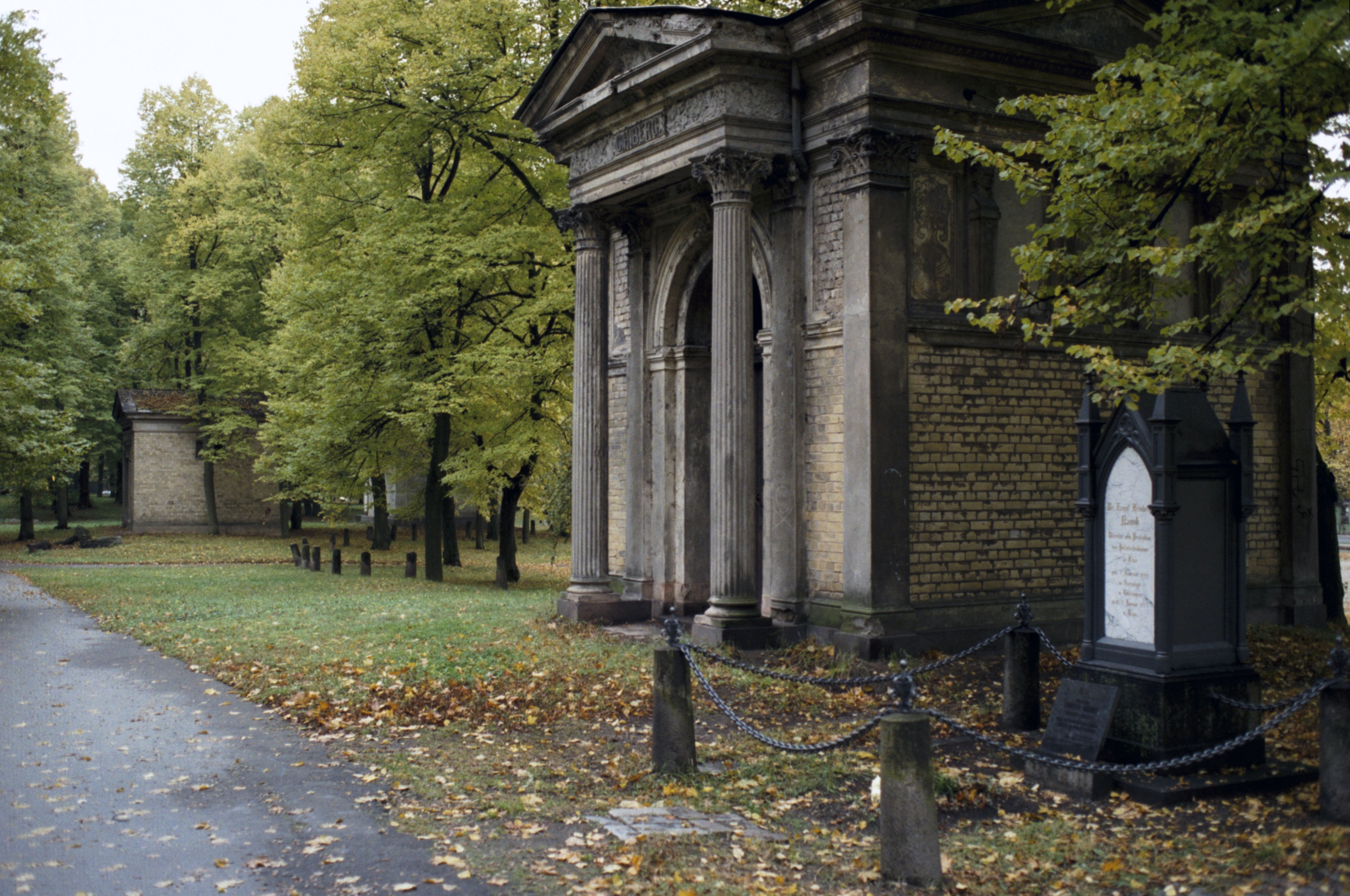
- Mausoleum of C. H. Berg in Riga's Great Cemetery
- Interactive map of Great Cemetery

Details
- Established: 1773
- Closed: 1957
- Location: Riga
- Country: Latvia
- Coordinates: 56°58′14″N 24°08′35″E
- Type: Closed, 1957
- Owned by: City of Rīga
- Size: 22 hectares (54 acres)
- No. of graves: unknown
- Find a Grave: Great Cemetery

The Great Cemetery (Latvian: Lielie kapi; German: Großer Friedhof) was formerly the principal cemetery of Riga in Latvia, established in 1773. It was the main burial ground of the Baltic Germans in Latvia.

Extensive damage and removal of many headstones and graves by the Soviet authorities governing the Latvian SSR after 1945 led to the suspension of burials and the eventual conversion of the burial ground to a public park. Despite this, a significant number of old graves have survived.

The 22-hectare (54 acres) property is currently owned by the Rīga City Council, located in the Vizdeme suburb of Rīga, and crossed by Senču street.

It is somewhat impossible to accurately determine the exact number of interred due to damaged records, particularly by Soviet authorities. Despite damage throughout, combined with lack of tending to the property, many artistically valuable gravestones still survive, and reflect various artistic styles of their eras.

== History ==
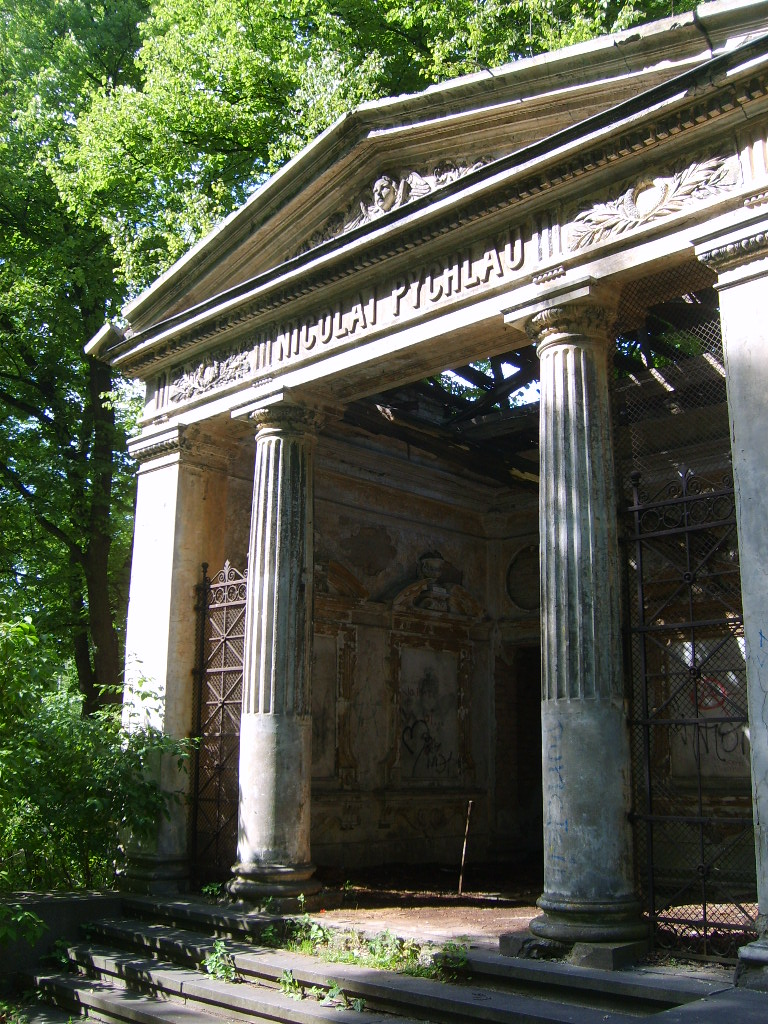
Mortuary of Pychlau family, Russian textile manufacturers

Between 1771 and 1772, Catherine the Great, empress of the Russian Empire, decreed that no-one, regardless of their social standing or class origins, was to be buried in a church crypt or churchyard; all burials were to take place in the new cemeteries to be built throughout the entire Russian empire, which were to be located outside town boundaries. These measures were intended to overcome the congestion of urban church crypts and graveyards, and were prompted by a number of outbreaks of highly contagious diseases linked to inadequate burial practices in urban areas, especially the black plague which had led to the Plague Riot in Moscow in 1771.

Against this background the Great Cemetery in Riga was founded in 1773. It served as a burial ground for over 170 years for almost all Baltic Germans who died in the city between 1773 and 1944. Additionally, numerous Latvians of upper social status were buried there as well. The cemetery was divided into three section: Lutheran, Roman Catholic, and Orthodox Christian.

One of the first to be (re-)buried there was the founder of the city, Albert of Riga, whose remains were exhumed from one of the city's main churches and transferred to the cemetery in 1773.

== Final burials 1939–1944 ==
Burials at the cemetery were drastically reduced after Hitler's forced transfer, under the Molotov–Ribbentrop Pact, of tens of thousands of Baltic Germans from Latvia in late 1939 to occupied areas in western Poland.

Burials at the cemetery continued on a much smaller scale until 1944, principally among those Baltic Germans who had refused Hitler's call to leave the region.

== Situation after 1944 ==
Hundreds of headstones and graves were removed or destroyed by the Soviet authorities during the second occupation of the Baltic states.

In 1957 the cemetery was closed completely for any further burials and began to fall into disrepair.

In 1967 or 1969 the city council decided to bulldoze large sections of the cemetery in order to transform it into a public memorial park.

The Russian Orthodox section of the cemetery, later named Pokrov Cemetery, is the only area which was not added to the territory of the Memorial Park and therefore was the only part to remain well preserved.

== Protected monument status ==
In the 1970s, the architectural ensemble of the Great Cemetery Garden, together with the buildings, was included in the List of State Protected Monuments of the Latvian SSR. 12 grave monuments were included in the List of Art Monuments of the Latvian SSR, and 15 objects were included in the List of Historical Monuments. Today, the selection of monuments is based on the Order No. 128 of the Ministry of Culture of the Republic of Latvia of 29 October 1998, which 16 historical, 24 art monuments and the ensemble of gardens and parks "Great Cemetery" with memorial buildings were recognized as historical monuments of national importance in the Great Cemetery.

In the late 1990s, 19 chapels, 242 monuments, 58 gravestones, 66 decorative fences, and 16 memorial graves remained in the Great Cemetery.

Many thousands of gravestones are located in the territory of the Improvement Department on Varoņu Street. After long discussions, in 2000, the Finance Committee of the Riga City Council decided to allocate 13,262 LVL from the city reserve fund for the arrangement of the gravestone warehouse on Varoņu Street - for inventory, survey and evaluation, as well as for moving and paying for transportation work, as the warehouse contained approximately 14,000 gravestones, including those of historical and artistic value.

== Present day ==
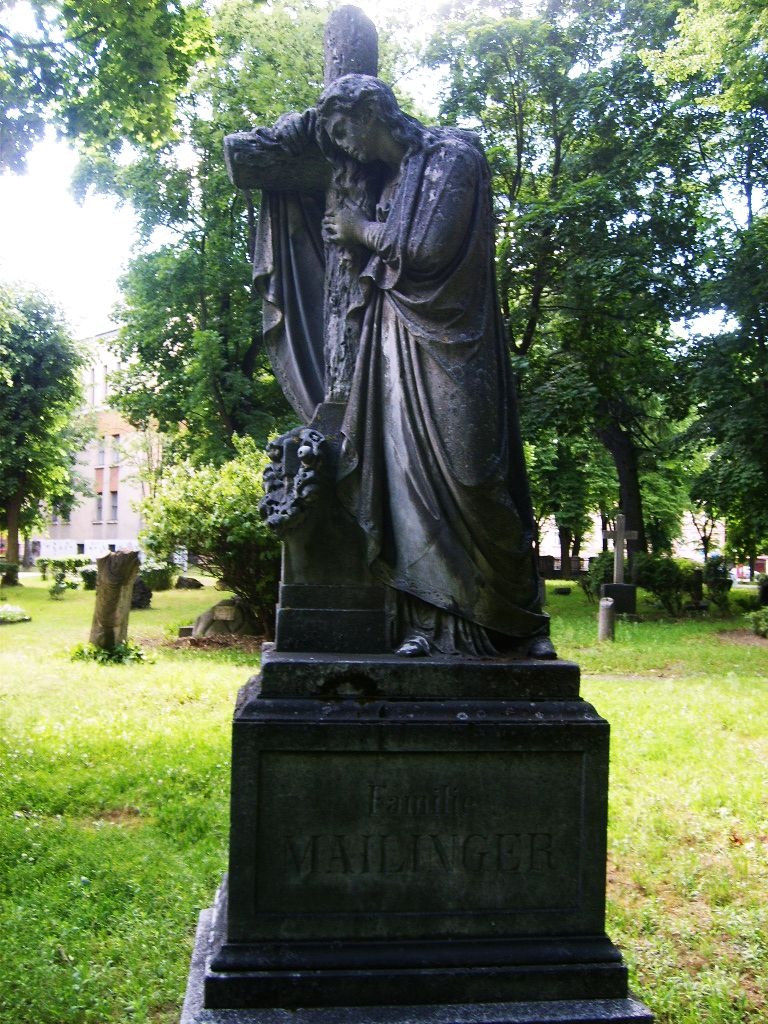
Grave stone of Baltic-German Mailinger family

Interments include a significant number of Baltic German and Latvian graves and family plots, including a restored crypt built in 1777 and the graves of Krišjānis Barons and Krišjānis Valdemārs, have survived the post-war destruction. However, many of these graves are in an abandoned or neglected condition.

The cemetery temporarily closed on 8 October 2023 due to a storm causing 25 trees to be toppled, and a further 50 requiring assessment. Currently it holds an estimated 60 species of trees and shrubs, including some 39 introduced species.

The city of Riga discussed exchanging St Peter's Church for the Great Cemetery so that the city can properly take over maintenance in 2008. In December 2023, an international design competition was publicized by the Latvian Association of Architects to "get creative ideas and proposals on how to respectfully preserve the burials of the Great Cemetery."

Gunārs Nāgels, head of the Riga Monuments Agency, stated that "The Great Cemetery is and will remain a cemetery, but it is also a park, and will remain so. Given the people buried there, it can additionally function as a kind of a museum. The ancestors of many people in Riga lie in the Great Cemetery. In view of this, developing and improving the Great Cemetery is a very difficult topic, and with the competition, we hope to find creative and respectful solutions."

The memorial park currently holds an estimated 60 species of trees and shrubs, including 39 introduced species.

In January 2024, Riga’s Municipality launched a competition for the development and restoration of the Great Cemetery, including its infrastructure and memorial crypts. The winners were announced in June 2024, when the committee decided to enter negotiations with the second place entrants. As a result of the competition, in late 2024, the restoration of a historic crypt, the burial place of the Baltic German Kröger family, which included a Riga mayor (1790–1856), was completed.

== Notable interments ==
- Albert of Riga, founder of the city (his remains were transferred here in 1773)
- Christoph Haberland, one of Riga's chief architects
- Johann Christoph Brotze, pedagogue and ethnographer
- Krišjānis Barons, Latvian folklorist
- Jānis Fridrihs Baumanis, Latvian architect
- Andrejs Pumpurs, Latvian poet and writer.
- Johann Daniel Felsko, architect of Riga from 1844 to 1879.
- Jāzeps Grosvalds, Latvian painter.
- Kārlis Mīlenbahs, Latvian linguist and lexicographer.
- Wilhelm Ostwald, Baltic German chemist and Nobel laureate.
- Heinrich Scheel, Baltic German architect.
- Relatives of Georg August Schweinfurth, Baltic German botanist and ethnographer, explorer of Africa and ethnologist (he himself is buried in Berlin).
- Krišjānis Valdemārs, leader of the Young Latvians movement.
- George Armitstead, Mayor of Riga from 1901 to 1912
- Reinhold Schmaeling, the chief architect of Riga from 1879 to 1915

== Gallery ==
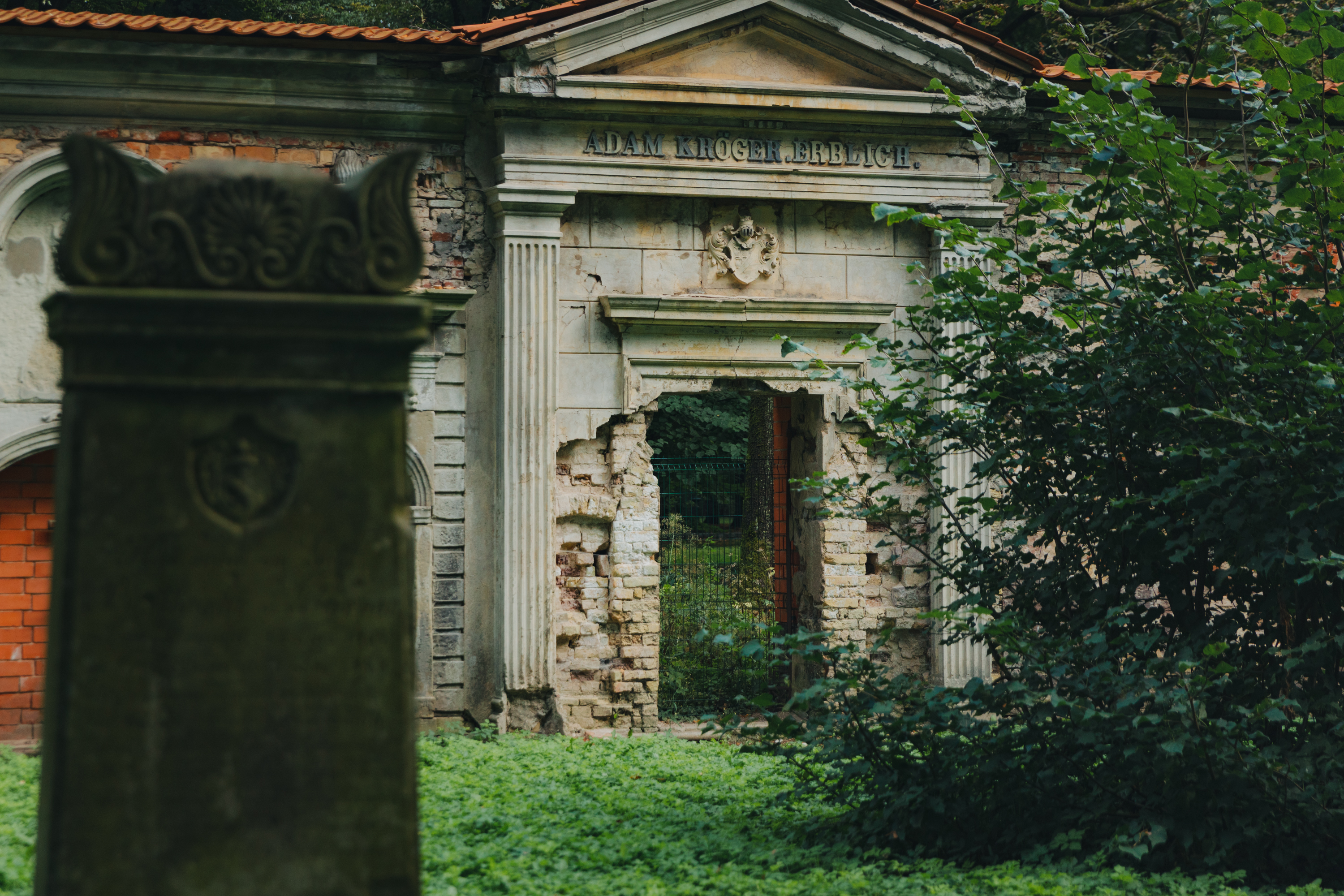

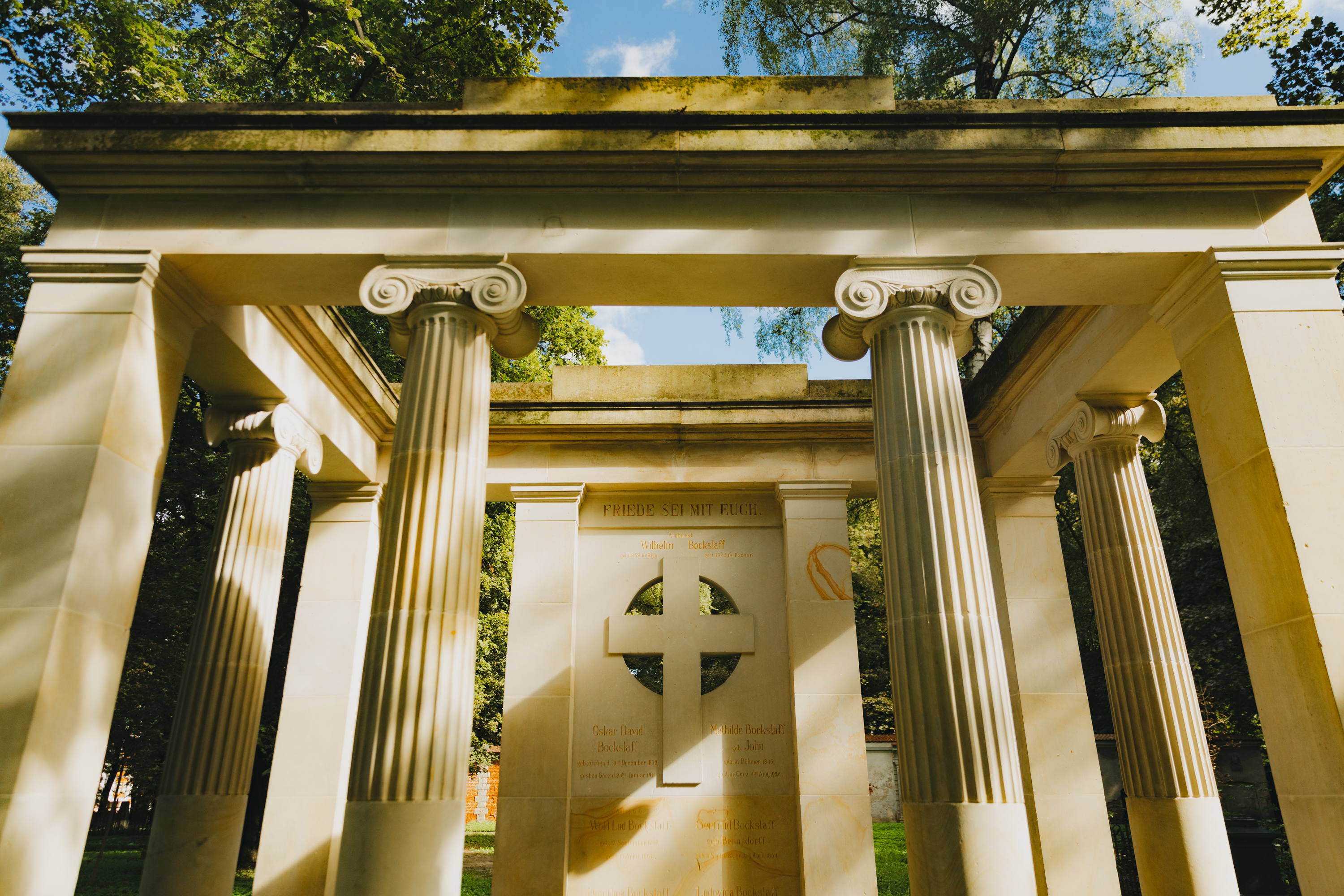

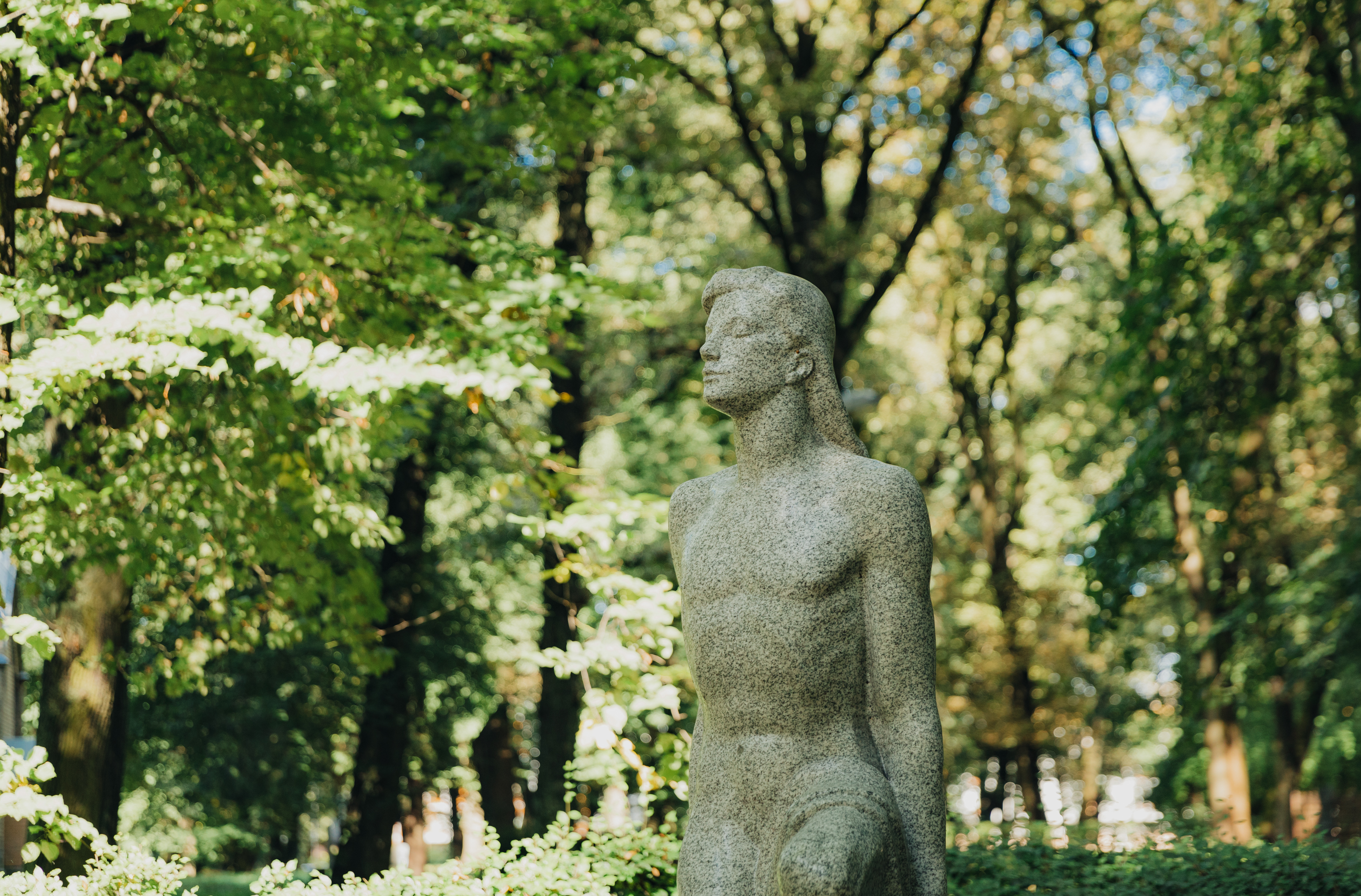

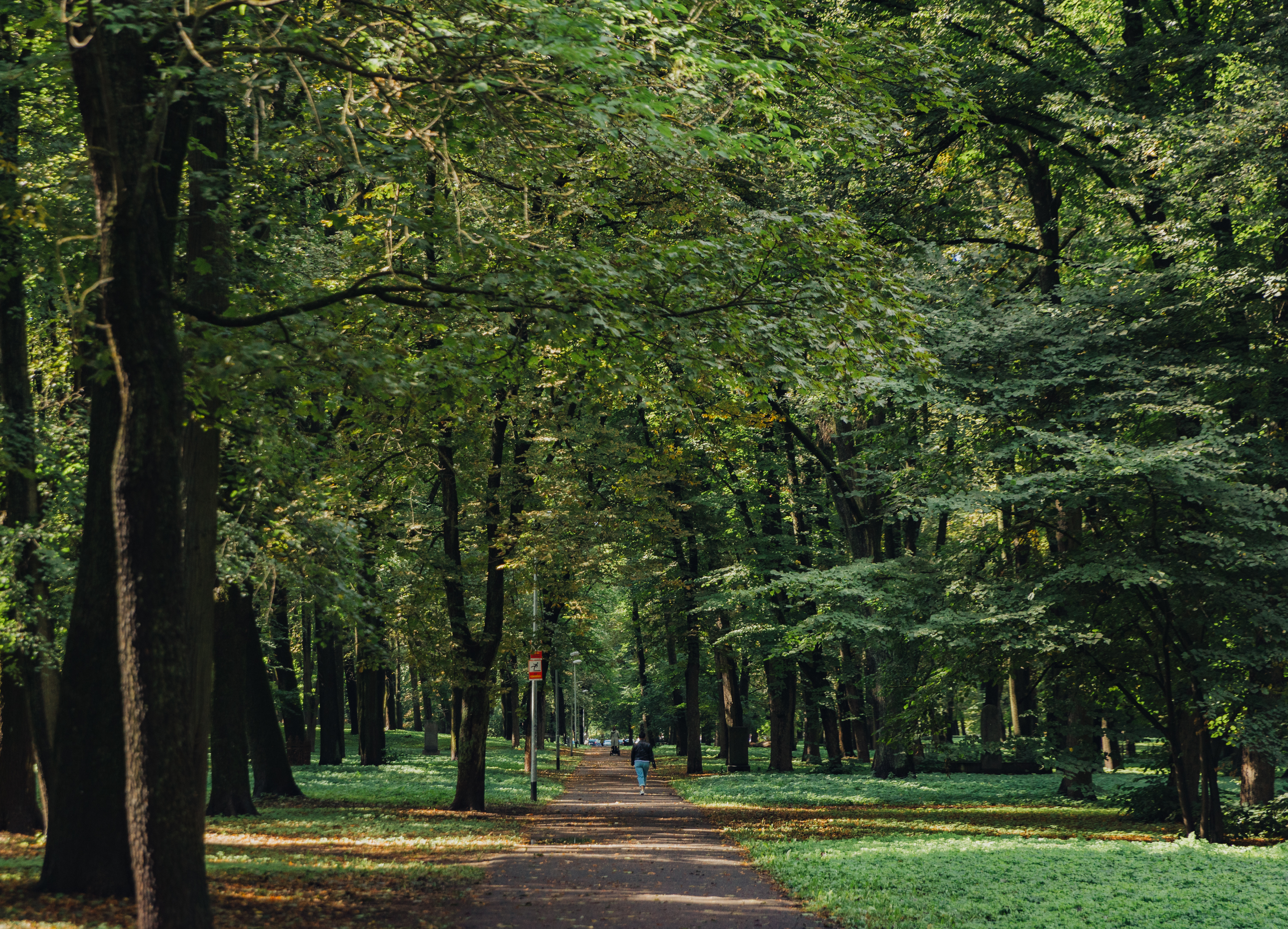

== See also ==
- Brothers' Cemetery (Riga)
- Kopli cemetery
- Nazi-Soviet population transfers
- List of cemeteries in Latvia

== Sources ==
- History of the cemetery (in Latvian)
