= Church of the Intercession (Mary) =

Church in Mary, Turkmenistan

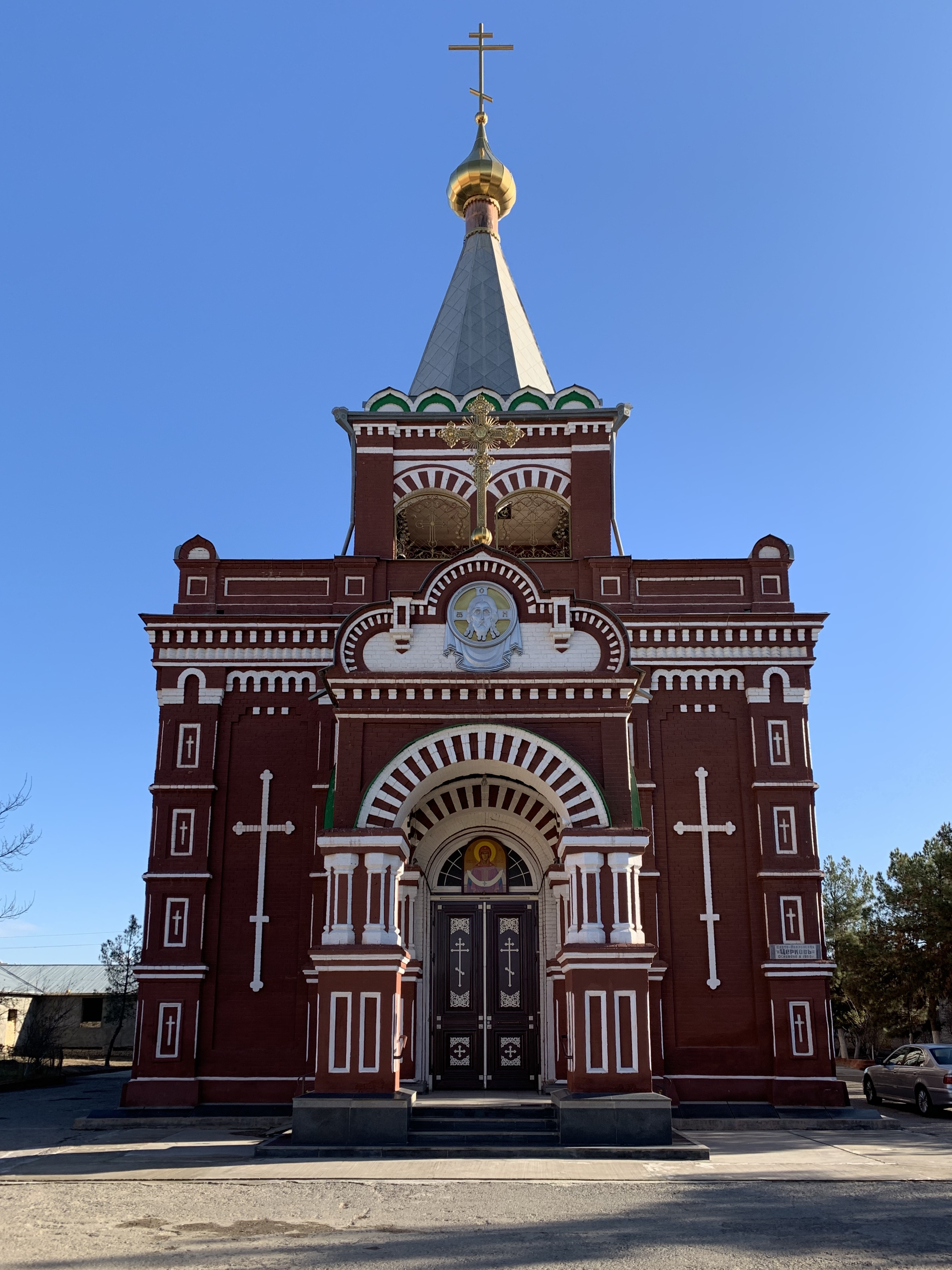

The Pokrovskaya Church (Russian: Храм Покрова Пресвятой Богородицы) is a Russian Orthodox Church in Mary, Turkmenistan built around 1900 by Russian forces when they seized the city of Mary in 1884 and guarded the city with a military garrison against frequent attacks by British forces and Afghan armies.

Early records of the church are scarce, but there are records of baptisms being performed by priest Tikhon Protasov and the deacon John Ilyichev in 1917. Following the Russian Revolution and the Establishment of the Soviet Union, religious freedoms were curtailed and by the 1930s, the church was closed and the building was repurposed as a club and eventually a military warehouse. The church returned to its original function in 1947, following the end of World War II.

== Architecture ==
The present church is made entirely of brick, which at the time, was somewhat in vogue as architects in St. Petersburg and Moscow had begun experimenting with red-brick facades. Brick was a natural choice in the sandy deserts of the region, which lacked trees to produce wooden buildings. The monotony of the red-brick facades is broken by alternating the colors of the bricks comprising the dental moldings and arches, so that each element alternates between red and white. Inside the Church, every spare piece of wall is covered by framed icons and other religious works.
