= Brīvzemnieki Parish =

Territorial entity of Aloja Municipality in Latvia

- parish of Latvia
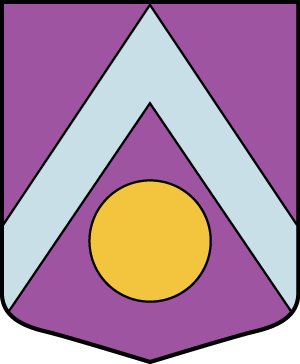
- Coat of arms

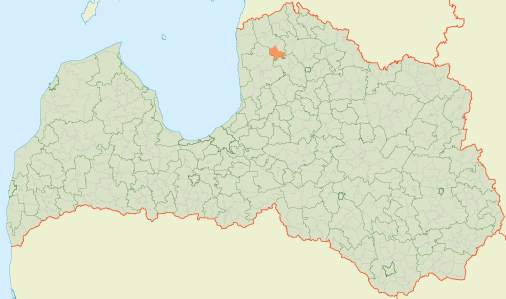
- 57°40′11″N 24°57′17″E
- Country: Latvia

Area
  - Total: 105.03 km^{2} (40.55 sq mi)
  - Land: 102.18 km^{2} (39.45 sq mi)
  - Water: 2.85 km^{2} (1.10 sq mi)

Population (1 January 2026)
  - Total: 762
  - Density: 7.46/km^{2} (19.3/sq mi)

Brīvzemnieki Parish (Latvian: Brīvzemnieku pagasts) is an administrative territorial entity of Limbaži Municipality in the Vidzeme region of Latvia. It was an administrative unit of Limbaži district. The administrative center is Puikule village.

== Towns, villages and settlements of Brīvzemnieki Parish ==
- Buiva
- Ozoli
- Ozolmuiža
- Puikule

== Water courses ==
Ežupīte, Īģe, Jogla, Paktene, Pērļupe, Struņķupīte, Zunda.

== Lakes ==
Lielais Ozolmuižas Lake, Mazais Ozolmuižas Lake, Paužezers (Paužas Lake), Purezers, Svētezers.

== See also ==
- Ozolmuiža Manor
- Puikule Manor
