= Church of the Intercession (Elizavetinskaya) =

Church in Rostov Oblast, Russia

Church of the Intercession of the Holy Virgin
- Церковь Покрова Пресвятой Богородицы
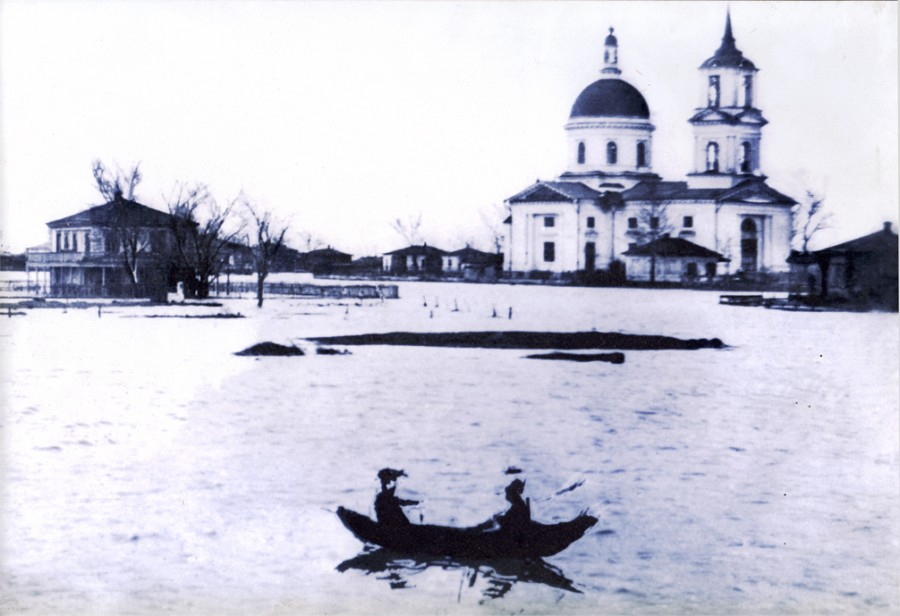
- The church pictured at a postcard, the beginning of the 20th century
- Church of the Intercession of the Holy Virgin
- Location: Elizavetinskaya, Rostov Oblast, Russia
- Country: Russia
- Denomination: Russian Orthodox

History
- Status: Parish church
- Dedication: Intercession of the Holy Virgin

Architecture
- Functional status: Destroyed
- Completed: 1824
- Demolished: 1938

The Church of the Intercession of the Holy Virgin (Russian: Церковь Покрова Пресвятой Богородицы) was a Russian Orthodox church in Elizavetinskaya stanitsa, Rostov Oblast, Russia.

== History ==
Originally in Elizavetinskaya village there was a reconstructed wooden church, which transported from Aksayskaya village in 1793. Because of frequent floods, it fell into disrepair. Because of that, in 1812 a three-altar church was laid in honor of the Intercession of the Blessed Virgin Mary. It was completed and consecrated 12 years afterward.

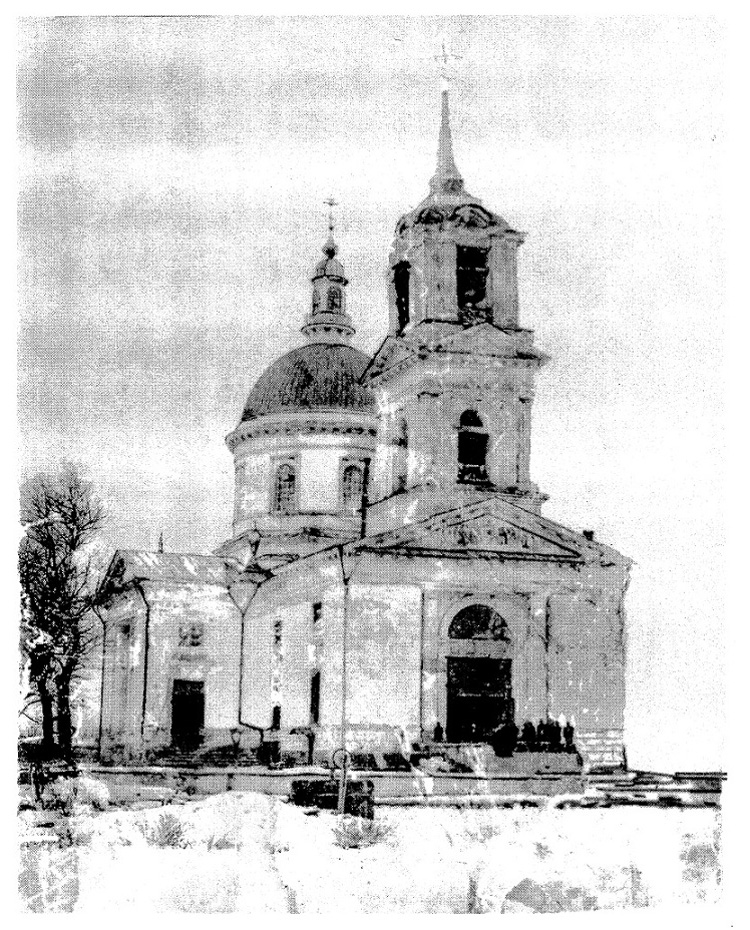
The Intercession Church

The Intercession Church was built of stone, it had a bell tower and three altars, consecrated in the name of the Intercession of the Mother of God, in honor of apostles Peter and Paul, in honor of the Great Martyr Paraskeva. The building of the church was plastered outside and inside, covered with iron, all the domes were painted green. At the tops of the chapels of the church and the bell tower there were a gilded ball and a cross; The Intercession Church had eight bells, the largest of them weighed 546 poods.

The church was destroyed in 1938. Only its foundation has survived. After the collapse of the USSR, the Chapel of the Intercession of the Blessed Virgin Mary was built on the site of the destroyed church.
