= Dikļi Manor =

Manor house in Latvia

Coordinates: 57.5979°N 25.1024°E

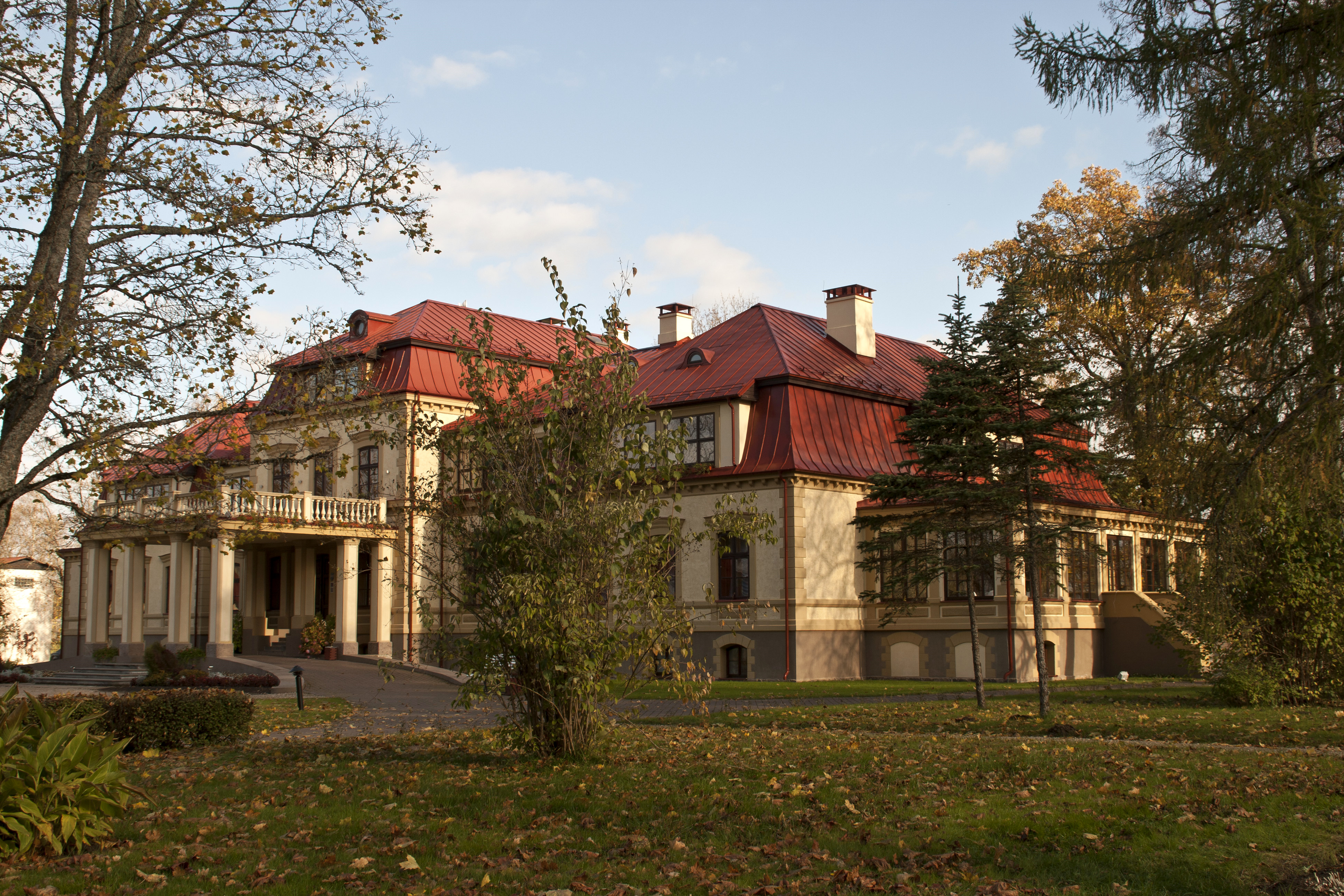
- Interactive map of the Dikļi Manor area

General information
- Architectural style: Neo-Baroque
- Location: Valmiera Municipality, Latvia
- Completed: 1896
- Client: Paul von Wolf

Dikļi Manor (Latvian: Dikļu muižas pils, German: Dickeln ) is a manor house in the Dikļi Parish of Valmiera Municipality in the Vidzeme region of Latvia. Dikļi Manor was built for Baron Paul von Wolf in 1896 and includes a 20 ha park that is home to around twenty exotic trees, such as the balsam fir and the Coast Douglas-fir. Manor house now operates as hotel.

== History ==
The earliest information about Dikļi manor dates back to 1456, when it was bought by Georg von der Pahlen, vassal of Silvester Stodewescher, Archbishop of Riga. It is known that prior to that it belonged to Rezede and Weipted, it may have been originally the side manor of Carlsberg Manor. The manor belonged to the Pahlen family until 1722, the end of Great Northern War. Later Löwenwolde, then Rosen, became its owners. In 1786 manor was bought by Tiesenhausen noble family, who owned it until 1846. From 1846 to 1860 owners were Hanenfeldt family. The last owners of the manor until Latvian Land Reform of 1920 were Irena and Eva Wolf. In 1919, the Valmiera District Administration, which was granted a manor, established a children's shelter here. In 1937 Dikļi manor became a sanatorium, in 1974 - the Republican Rehabilitation Hospital for Traumatology and Orthopedics.

== See also ==
- List of palaces and manor houses in Latvia
