= Intercession of the Theotokos Church, Riga =

Intercession of the Theotokos Church

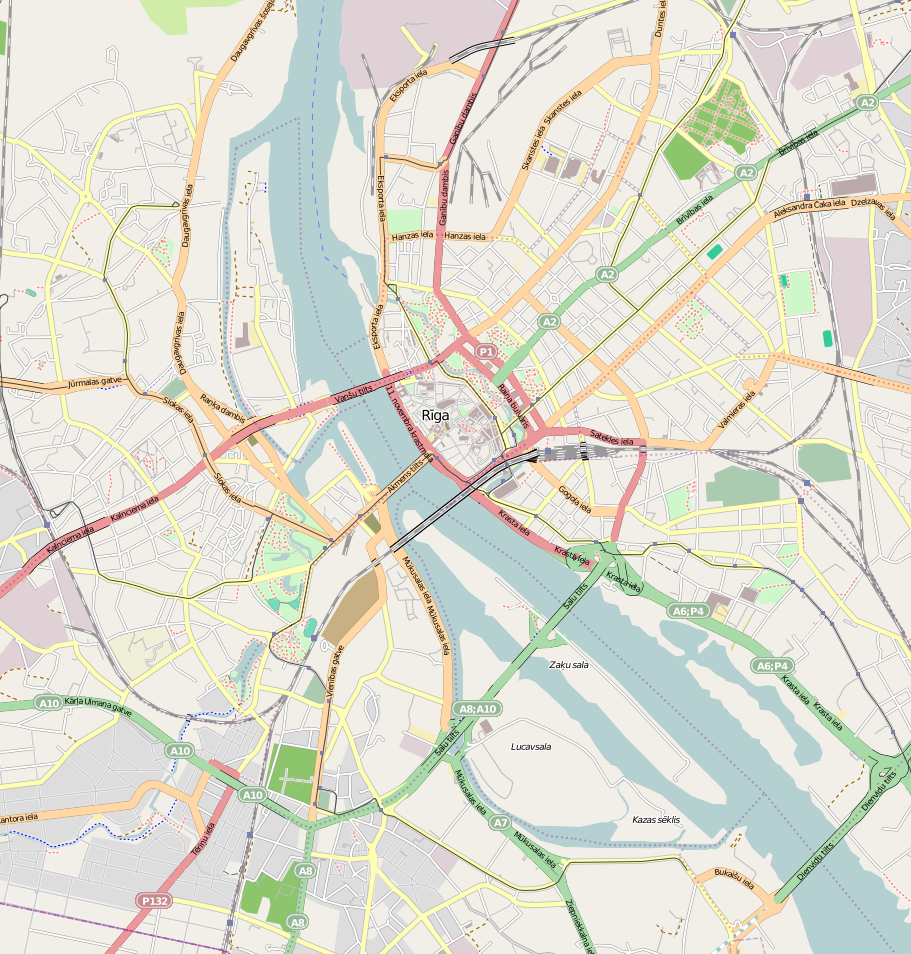
- Location within Riga
- 56°58′7.42″N 24°8′22.01″E
- Location: Riga
- Country: Latvia
- Denomination: Eastern Orthodox

Intercession of the Theotokos Church (Latvian: Vissvētās Dievmātes Patvēruma pareizticīgo baznīca) is an Eastern Orthodox church in Riga, the capital of Latvia. The church is situated at the address 3 Mēness Street.
