= Attack on Riga (1941) =

- Part of Operation Barbarossa, Eastern Front of World War II
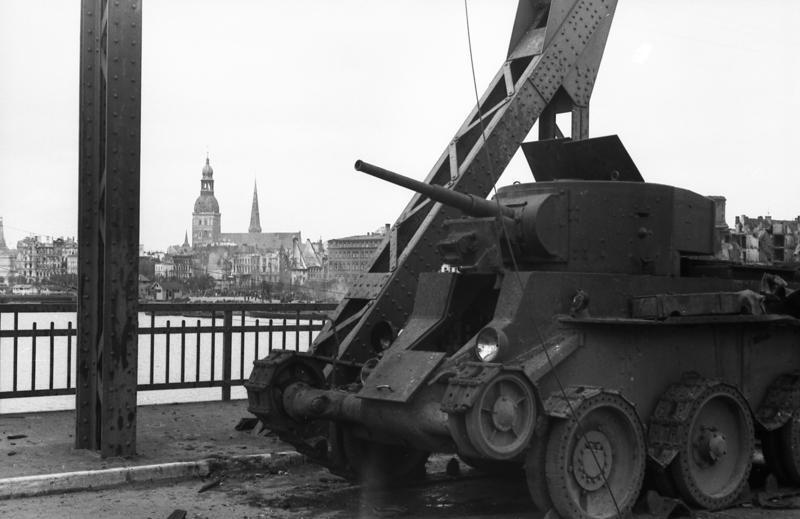
- Destroyed Soviet tank on a bridge in Riga, in the background Riga Cathedral, 21 June 1941
Date	27 June – 1 July 1941
Location	Riga, Latvia 56°57′00″N 24°06′00″E
Result	German victory; Riga captured by Wehrmacht
Territorial changes	German occupation of Riga

Belligerents
Soviet Union	Germany

Commanders and leaders
Maj. Gen. Nikolai Berzarin; Jānis Kalnbērziņš; Various NKVD officers	Gen. Siegfried Hänicke; Col. Otto Lasch

Units involved
10th Rifle Corps; 5th NKVD Motorized Rifle Regiment; Riga Workers’ Battalions; Riga Military School cadets	18th Army; 61st Infantry Division; 43rd Infantry Regiment; Tank units from 4th Panzer Group

Strength
~3,900 NKVD troops (22nd Division) + unknown Red Army and militia	Unknown, included tanks, artillery, and infantry divisions

Casualties and losses
~1000	532 killed (Wehrmacht, per German sources)
- Fires during the battle destroyed parts of Old Riga including St. Peter’s Church and the House of the Blackheads.
- Location of Riga in Latvia

The 1941 attack on Riga was an offensive operation by the armed forces of Nazi Germany during the German occupation of Latvia in 1941, taking place from June 29 to July 1. During the attack, a large part of Old Riga was destroyed.

== The situation before the start of the battle ==
On June 24, the commander of the 27th Army of the Red Army stationed in Latvian territory, Major General Nikolai Berzarin, ordered the establishment of defensive positions along the Daugava River from Riga to Līvāni. Further along the river, the Soviet 8th Army, retreating from Lithuania, was expected to take positions. The plan for setting up this defensive line was disrupted by the rapid offensive of the Wehrmacht’s 4th Panzer Group’s 41st Motorized Corps toward Jēkabpils. The 1st Panzer Division captured Krustpils, crossed the Daugava, and established a bridgehead on the right bank of the river, while the 6th Panzer Division captured Līvāni on June 28. At the same time, the Wehrmacht’s 18th Army’s 1st Army Corps reached the Daugava near Jaunjelgava, and the 26th Army Corps captured Jelgava and Bauska on June 29, from where they launched an offensive toward Riga. In this situation, the Red Army high command ordered a withdrawal from the Daugava defense line to the Velikaya defense line (the so-called Stalin Line), which had been constructed beyond the Latvia–Russia border before the 1940 occupation of Latvia.

=== Uprising in Riga ===
According to the mobilization plan, on the evening of June 22, 1941, the 5th Motorized Rifle Regiment of the NKVD’s operational forces (commander Arseny Golovko) arrived in Riga from Baranovichi. On June 23, it was ordered to form the NKVD 22nd Motorized Rifle Division (Russian: 22-я мотострелковая дивизия внутренних войск НКВД СССР), consisting of 3,904 soldiers. The NKVD 1st Motorized Rifle Regiment was stationed in Kaunas, and the NKVD 3rd Regiment in Tallinn. The 5th Regiment’s task was to suppress any potential local uprisings.

Already on the night of June 23, Latvian national partisans attacked a building housing employees of the Central Committee of the Latvian Communist Party. On June 25, the first secretary of the Latvian Communist Party, Jānis Kalnbērziņš, summoned 18 Spanish Civil War veterans living in Riga and tasked them with forming volunteer battalions to defend the bridges of Riga. The first battalion was commanded by Arturs Narbatovičs and Georgs Broziņš, the second by Krišs Godkalns and Kārlis Rozenbergs, and the third by Fridrihs Veisenfelds and Jānis Beniķis. Participants also included Žanis Grīva, Alberts Spalāns, Makss Gurevičs, and others. A Komsomol (youth) company was also formed under Arvīds Rendnieks. On June 27, the first battalion took positions near the Pontoon Bridge, the second near the Railway Bridge and Riga Central Market, and the third was sent to guard the Ķegums Hydroelectric Power Station.

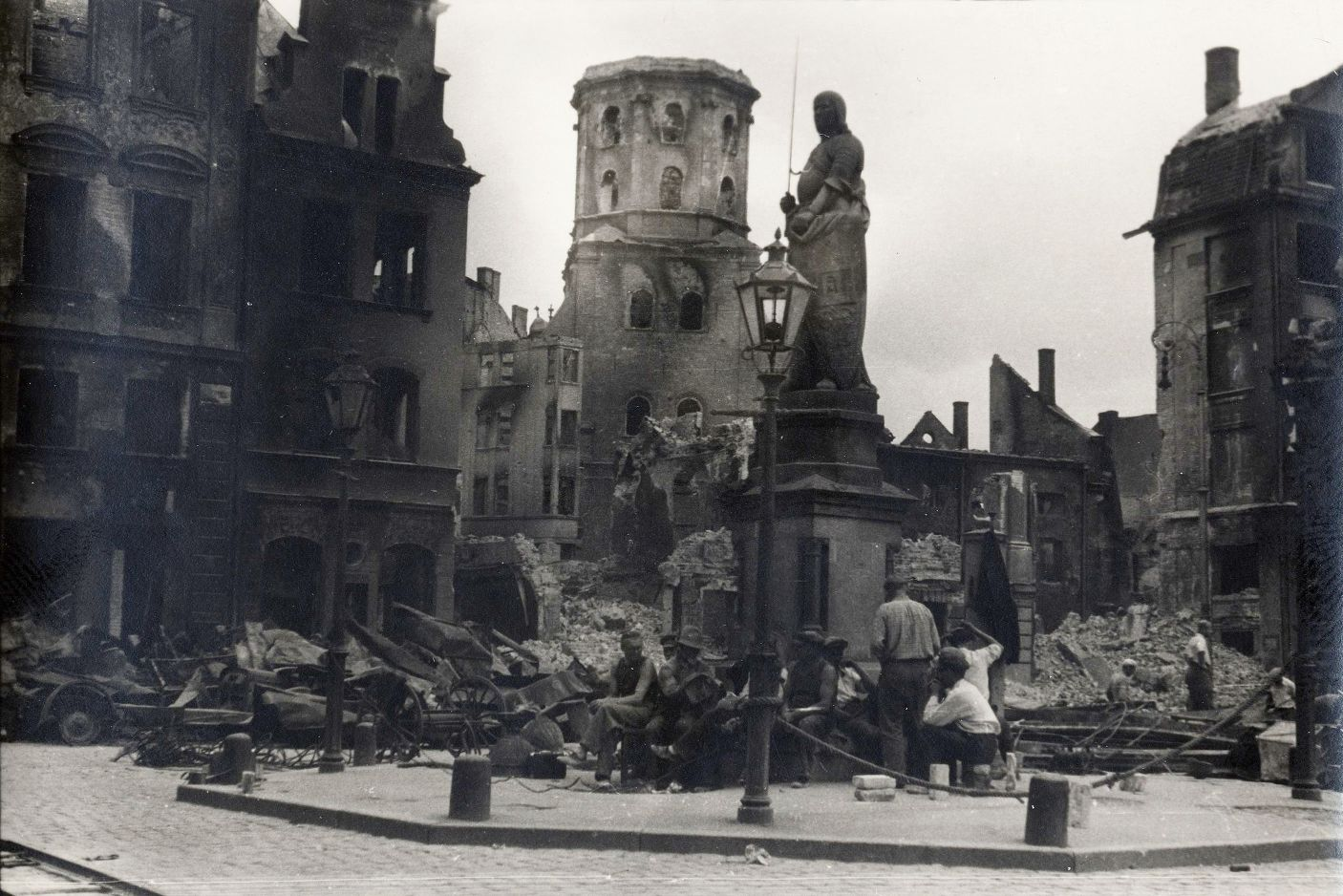
Destroyed St. Peter's church in Riga

On the afternoon of June 27, a battle occurred near the Central Market pavilions between the 2nd Workers’ Battalion and a group of national partisans, during which most of the partisans were killed. The 1st Battalion’s positions were also fired upon from windows of buildings along the Daugava embankment. On June 28, insurgents captured the Riga radio building and broadcast a statement announcing the formation of a "Provisional Government of Latvia."

=== Battle for the Railway Bridge ===
On June 29, a battle occurred for the Riga Railway Bridge, during which, according to German sources, 532 Wehrmacht soldiers were killed. A strike group of the Wehrmacht’s 43rd Infantry Regiment from the 1st Infantry Division, commanded by Colonel Otto Lasch, crossed the still-intact Daugava Railway Bridge around noon with six tanks, light artillery, and mortars. They broke through to the vicinity of Riga’s central bus station, where the Red Army surrounded and destroyed them. At the same time, Soviet engineers demolished the Daugava Railway Bridge. The leadership of the Red Army’s 10th Rifle Corps contacted the artillerymen in Mangaļsala and requested support. By noon, 130 mm and 152 mm coastal defense guns were turned toward the city center and opened indirect fire in Riga’s direction.

=== Destruction in Old Riga ===
During the battle, a fire broke out in Old Riga. St. Peter’s Church, the House of the Blackheads, the Town Hall, and other nearby buildings (Kamarins’ House, the Resource Society House, Jakša Trading House, etc.) were destroyed. It is known that an observation post for artillery fire correction had been established in the St. Peter’s Church tower, and it contained ammunition. Both sides later blamed each other for the burning of the church. For his role in the battle at the Railway Bridge, Colonel Otto Lasch of the Wehrmacht’s 43rd Infantry Regiment was awarded the Knight’s Cross of the Iron Cross (Ritterkreuz des Eisernen Kreuzes) on July 17, 1941.

== Capture of Riga ==
During the night of June 30, members of the Latvian SSR government and the Central Committee of the Latvian Communist Party evacuated to Valka with their families. In the early hours of July 1, the last Red Army units also left Riga. As the main German forces approached the Daugava, they constructed a pontoon bridge in the Katlakalns area, crossed the river, and entered Riga almost without resistance on July 1 via the Latgale suburb. The only major exchange of fire occurred at the Ivans Cemetery near St. John the Forerunner Church.
