= Aiviekste hydroelectric power station =

Hydroelectric power station in Latvia

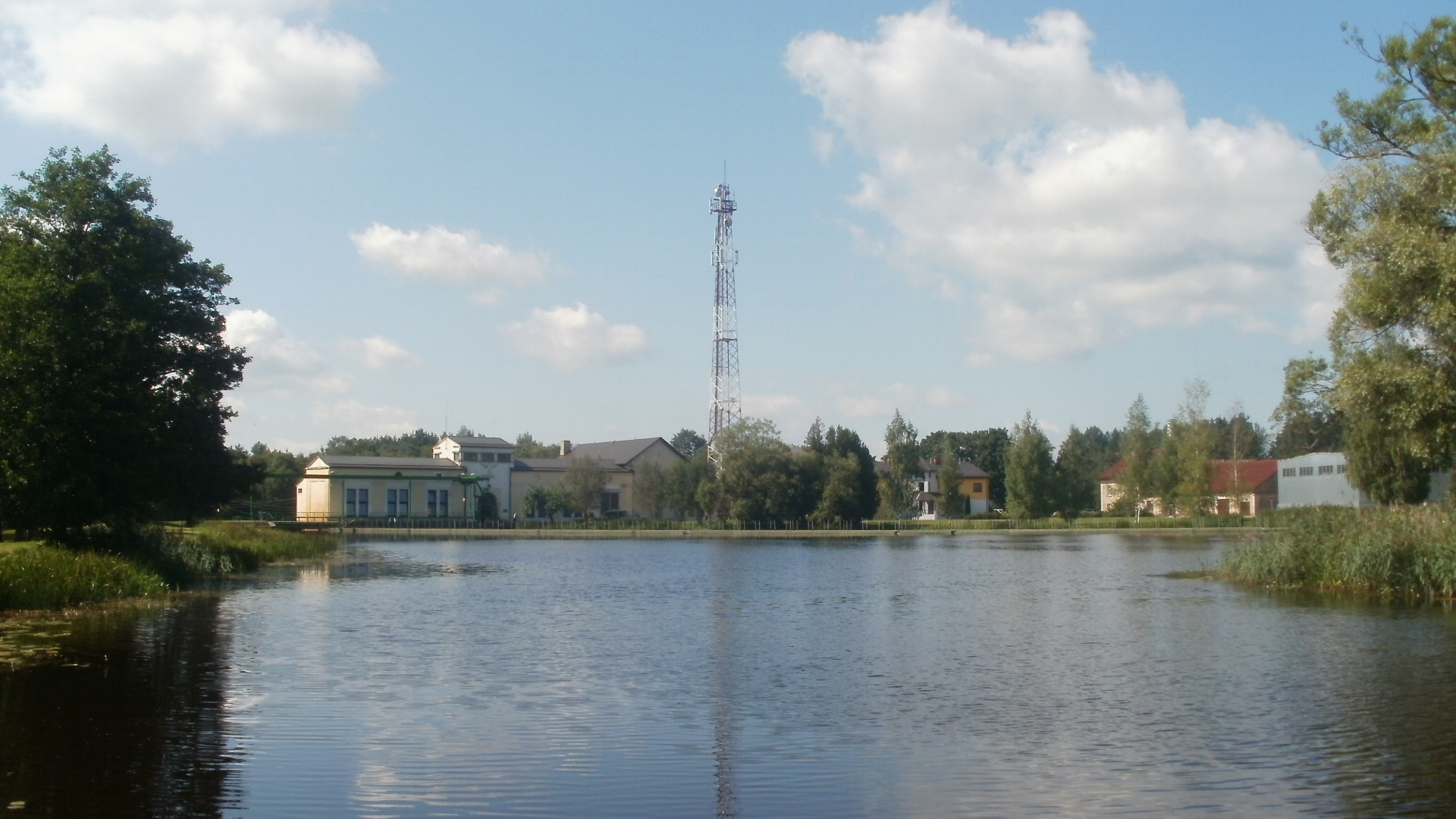

- Location within Latvia
- Interactive map of Aiviekste hydroelectric power station
- Coordinates: 56°38′46″N 25°56′53″E
- Status: Operational

Power Station
- Operator: Latvenergo
- Commission date: 1925; 1993
- Decommission date: 1969
- Type: Conventional
- Turbines: 10
- Installed capacity: 0.8 MW
- Capacity factor: 42.8% (2007)
- 2007 generation: 3 GW·h

Aiviekste hydroelectric power station is the first hydroelectric power station constructed in Latvia. It is located on the Aiviekste River. The power station was commissioned in 1925 and until 1938 it was the largest in Latvia. The power station was decommissioned in 1969; however, in 1988 it was decided to restore it. In 1993, the power station restarted power generation.

The power station has total capacity of 0.8 MW. In 2007, it generated 3GWh of electricity. The power station is operated by Latvenergo.

The reconstruction of the hydropower plant was completed in 2022, and the plant’s capacity increased from 0.8 MW to 1.5 MW. The connection of Aiviekste HPP to the electricity network was also rebuilt. In 2023, 4.2 GWh of electricity were generated at Aiviekste HPP. "Generation". Latvenergo.

== See also ==
- Riga Hydroelectric Power Plant
