= Latvenergo =

Latvian electric utility company

- Company type: State owned
- Industry: Electricity
- Founded: 1939
- Headquarters: Riga, Latvia
- Key people: Mārtiņš Čakste (CEO)
- Revenue: 1,065 MEUR (2021)
- Net income: 72 MEUR (2021)
- Total assets: 3,476 MEUR (2021)
- Total equity: 2,123 MEUR (2021)
- Number of employees: 3150 (2022)
- Website: www.latvenergo.lv

Latvenergo is a state-owned electric utility company in Latvia. Latvenergo Group provides energy supply services in the Baltics.

== Overview ==
The Group comprises the parent company Latvenergo AS, with decisive influence, and five subsidiaries. Latvenergo AS ensures generation and trade of electricity and thermal energy as well as trade of natural gas. Sadales tīkls AS ensures electricity distribution to each customer. Elektrum Eesti OÜ and Elektrum Lietuva UAB conduct electricity trade in Estonia and Lithuania respectively. Enerģijas publiskais tirgotājs AS carries out administration of electricity mandatory procurement.

Latvenergo has four hydroelectric power plants: Pļaviņu HES, Rīgas HES, Ķeguma HES and Aiviekstes HES, with total installed capacity of 1535 MW, two combined heat and power plants with total electrical capacity of 474 MW and heat capacity of 1525 MW and a wind farm near Ainaži with installed capacity of 1.2 MW.

== History ==
The company traces its origins to the establishment of the Ķegums HPP in 1939, when the State Electricity Company "Ķegums" was established on 22 December by a decision of the Cabinet of Ministers.

The current name was first used in the 1980s, but a similar name appeared as early as 1941, when private power plants and electricity grids were nationalised after the occupation of Latvia and the state energy authority "Latenergo" was established. During the Latvian SSR, several large power plants were built and the state energy industry was restructured several times. In 1989, Latvenergo, a production association subordinated to Latvian institutions, was established.

On 30 June 2021, the Estonian subsidiary Elektrum Eesti acquired several microgrid service companies (Energiaturu Võrguehitus OÜ, SNL Energia 1 OÜ and Baltic Energy System OÜ) owning substations with their own customer base, managing 53 MW of electricity connections and transporting almost 80 GWh of electricity per year; the transaction was cleared by the Estonian Competition Authority on 3 August.

On 22 July 2022, the company Latvijas vēja parki SIA was established together with JSC Latvijas valsts meži for the production of wind energy. Latvenergo acquired 80 % of the shares in the new company and Latvijas valsts meži 20 %. It is planned to install 100 to 120 wind generators in several large wind parks with a total capacity of around 800 MW, generating 2.4 TWh of electricity per year.
