= Christian Dahl =

Latvian sea captain (1839–1904)

Christian Dahl (Latvian: Kristiāns Dāls, 19 April 1839 – 10 September 1904) was a sea captain, explorer and naval educator in the Russian Empire. He came from a Swedish family, was born in Tallinn and lived most of his life in present-day Latvia. In 1864 he became director of Ainaži Nautical School in Ainaži. Under his leadership, it became a widely emulated model school. In 1876 he led an expedition to explore the navigability of the river Ob in Siberia. He returned the following two years and played an instrumental role in opening up a direct trade route from Siberia to Western Europe. In 1893 Dahl moved to Liepāja, where he had been appointed director of the present-day Liepaja Maritime College. He died there in 1904.

== Early life and career ==
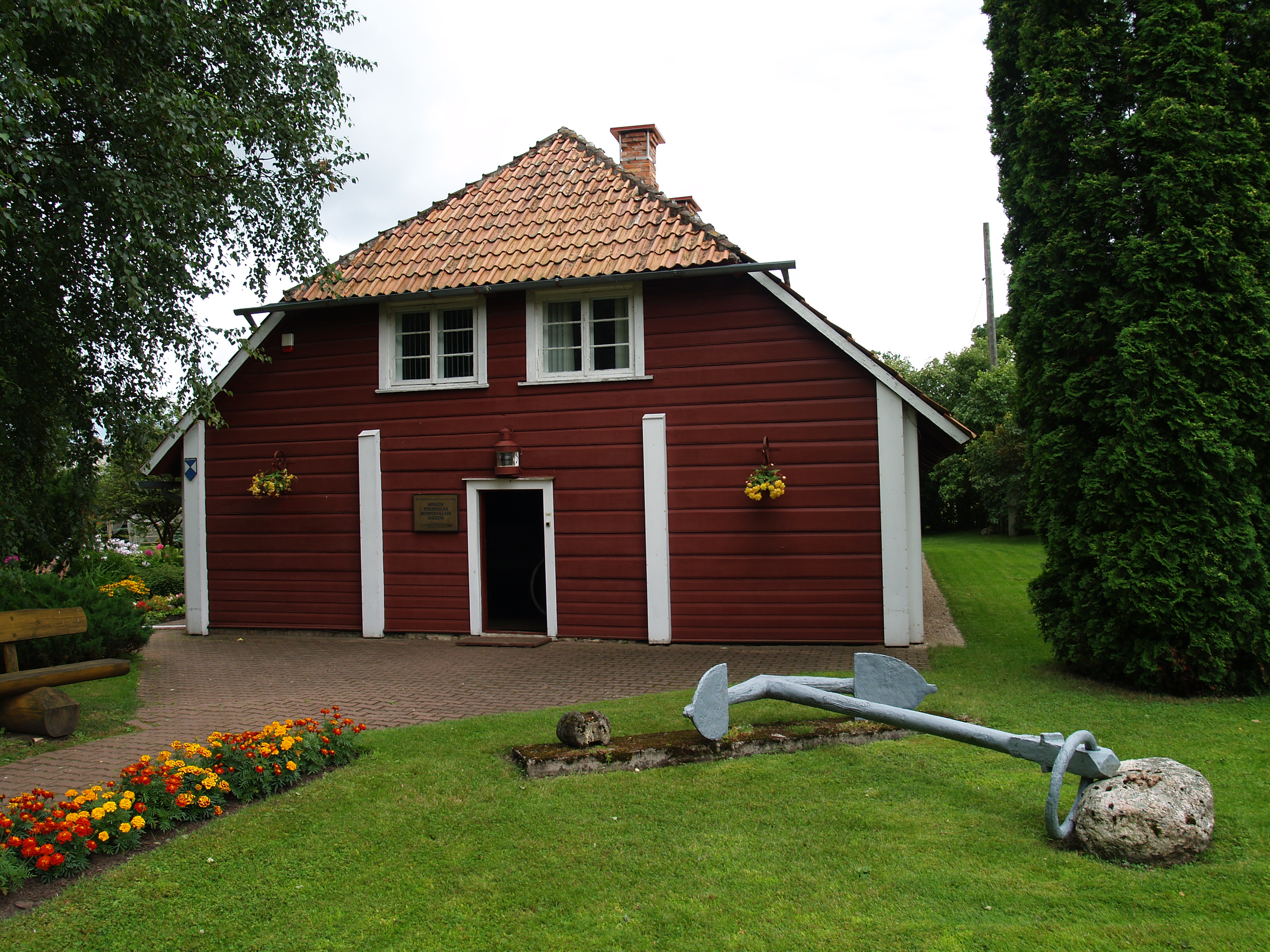
The original building of the Ainaži nautical school, today a museum

Christian Dahl was born in Tallinn (today the capital of Estonia, then part of the Russian Empire), and was of Swedish descent. He came from a family of seafarers and entered a nautical school in Riga in 1857. In 1863 he became a shipmaster.

In 1864, he left a lucrative career as a merchant captain to accept the position of director of Ainaži nautical school in Ainaži. The school had been founded by Krišjānis Valdemārs and was the first nautical school teaching in the Estonian and Latvian languages. Founding the school was part of the First Latvian National Awakening and a conscious effort to strengthen the economic situation of the land and integrate it into the Western world. Christian Dahl took up the position because he wanted to contribute to the educational effort. Supposedly, Dahl learnt Latvian well enough to be able to teach at the school in just a few months.

== Ob river expedition ==
Dahl was contacted, probably in the winter of 1875, by Valdemārs who proposed Dahl to head an expedition to the river Ob in Siberia, to explore its sailing conditions. In the spring of 1876 Dahl set out together with his colleague from the nautical school Nikolai Raudsepp and travelled overland via Moscow to Tyumen, where a ship was being constructed and supplied by a local merchant named Trofimov. The vessel, named the Moskva, would carry them downstream towards the Ob via Tobolsk. The crew was recruited on the spot and frequently changed composition. At one point it consisted of "two Poles who had been sent into exile, an erstwhile violinist, a Cossack and a Greek, none of them standing out for their work ethic and all lacking any idea about sails." The aims of the expedition were to map the river, make metrological observations and compile a basic dictionary of an Ostyak language. Their ship began its journey on 13 June and by 22 June they had reached Beryozovo. In Obdorsk (present-day Salekhard), which they reached on 29 June, they encountered the expedition of German naturalist Alfred Brehm. In early July they reached the Gulf of Ob, and began their return journey on 20 July. They reached Obdorsk on 24 August.

== Later Siberian expeditions ==
In May 1877 Dahl purchased a steamboat in Lübeck, named Luise. He travelled via London and Tromsø in the summer, and by 30 July reached the entrance to the Kara Sea. The purpose of this second voyage was to determine if it was possible to reach the Ob river from the west, and how deep the sea between Novaya Zemlya and the Russian mainland was. Despite drifting sea ice and briefly running aground, the Luise managed to reach the Ob, and on 8 September Dahl reached his destination in Tobolsk.

The following summer Dahl and Raudsepp, together with pupils from the school in Ainaži, again made an expedition to Tobolsk. There, three sailing ships were equipped and loaded with cargo destined for England; the Luise also sailed with a cargo of wheat to Germany. In the summer of 1879, another flotilla sailed from Tobolsk to Western Europe via the Ob river and the Kara Sea, led by Luise; however by that time apparently no longer with the participation of Dahl. Through these Siberian expeditions, Dahl was instrumental in opening up a direct trade route from Siberia to Western Europe.

== Later life ==
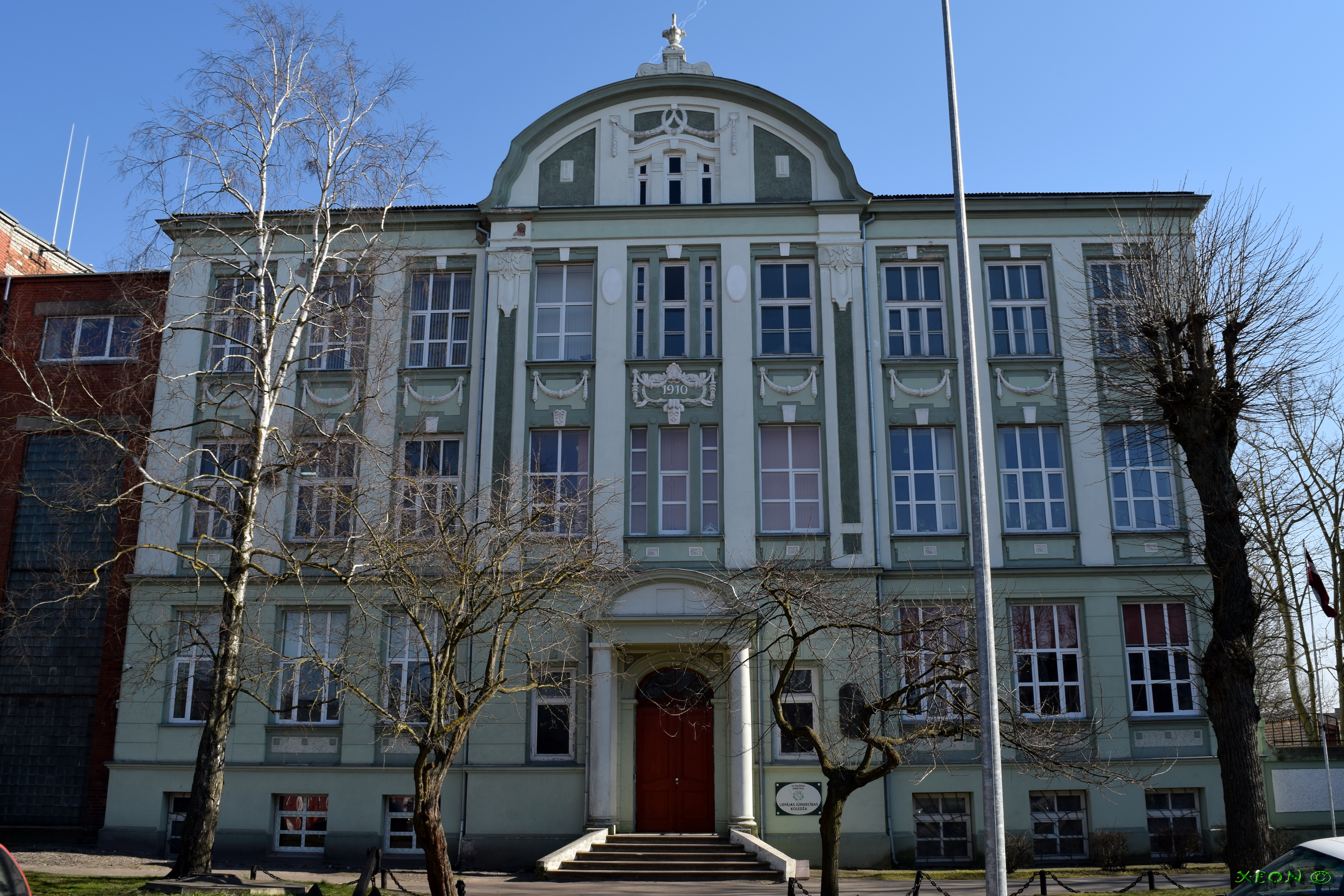
Current main building of the Liepaja Maritime College. Dahl became its director in 1893.

Upon his return, Dahl continued as head of the navigational school in Ainaži, which under his leadership became a model widely emulated in the territory of present-day Latvia and beyond; eventually 40 new nautical schools were established with it as a model in the Russian Empire; eleven of these were in the present-day territory of Latvia. He also published articles, including reports on the Siberian expeditions, and teaching manuals.

In 1893 he moved to Liepāja, where he had been appointed director of the nautical school, present-day Liepaja Maritime College. He died there in 1904 and is buried at the northern cemetery of the city.

== Awards and commemoration ==
During his lifetime, Dahl was awarded the Imperial Russian Order of Saint Anna (third class) and the Order of Saint Stanislaus (second class).

In Liepāja there is a street named after Dahl. The Maritime Administration of Latvia operates a hydrographic vessel named after Dahl, R/V Kristiāns Dāls (2001).
