= Ķegums Hydroelectric Power Station =

Hydroelectric power plant in Latvia

Ķegums Hydro Power Plant
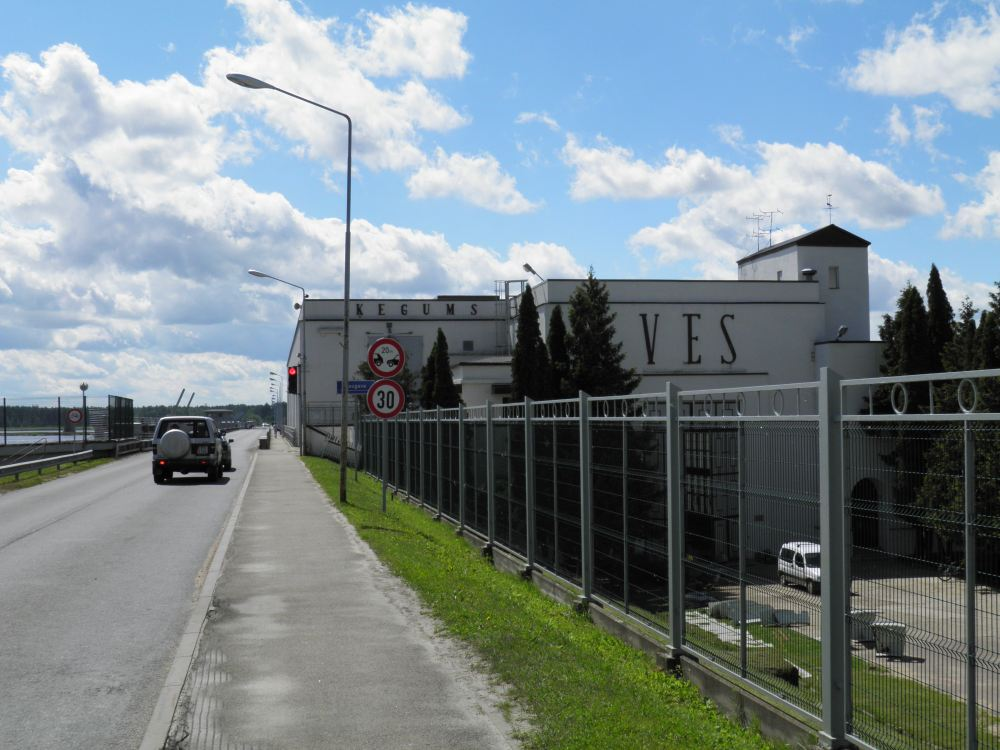

- Location within Latvia
- Country: Latvia
- Location: Ķegums
- Coordinates: 56.7401095°N 24.7104836°E
- Status: Operational

Power Station
- Operator: Latvenergo
- Commission date: 1939 (1969)
- Type: Conventional
- Turbines: 7
- Installed capacity: 248 MW
- Capacity factor: 24.1% (2007)
- 2007 generation: 524 GW·h

The Ķegums Hydro Power Plant is the oldest hydropower plant on the river Daugava and the third largest in Latvia located in Ķegums. The complex consist of two power plants. The first plant was built from 1936 to 1939. The plant was totally renovated from 1998 to 2001, including replacement of four hydroelectric sets with a nominal output of around 65 MW.

The second plant was built from 1976 to 1979. It has three hydroelectric sets with installed capacity of 192 MW.

The complex is operated by Latvenergo.

== See also ==
- Riga Hydroelectric Power Plant
