= Sadales tīkls =

Latvian electricity distribution company

- Native name: AS "Sadales tīkls"
- Type: Joint-stock company
- Industry: Electric power distribution
- Founded: 18 September 2006
- Headquarters: Riga, Latvia
- Services: Electricity distribution system services
- Revenue: €382.239 million (2025)
- Operating income: €57.474 million (2025)
- Net income: €35.270 million (2025)
- Total assets: €1.935 billion (2025)
- Owner: Latvenergo
- Number of employees: 1,685 (2025 year-end)
- Parent: Latvenergo
- Website: www.sadalestikls.lv

Sadales tīkls is a Latvian electric power distribution company and distribution network operator based in Riga. It supplies electricity to 99% of power users in Latvia. The company is wholly owned by Latvenergo.

Sadales tīkls operates within Latvia's regulated electricity distribution sector. Its tariff methodology, network-investment costs and 2023 tariff changes have been covered by the State Audit Office, the Public Utilities Commission, Latvian media and the OECD.

== Corporate data ==
Sadales tīkls was registered in the Latvian Commercial Register on 18 September 2006, with registration number 40003857687. Its registered address is Šmerļa iela 1, Riga, and its registered share capital is €652.693 million. The Register of Enterprises of Latvia records the company as a legal person of significance to national security.

In 2023, Sadales tīkls had revenue of €343.33 million and net profit of €16.9 million, after a loss of €20.4 million in the previous year. In 2024, the company's revenue was €371.812 million and profit was €28.256 million. In 2025, Sadales tīkls reported revenue of €382.239 million, operating profit of €57.474 million, net profit of €35.270 million, total assets of €1.935 billion and 1,685 employees at year-end.

== Operations ==
Sadales tīkls operates Latvia's main electricity distribution network. In 2025, the company reported 92,516 km of power distribution lines and 6,293 GWh of distributed electricity.

In March 2025, the European Investment Bank signed a €200 million financing operation for a 2024–2026 Latvian electricity distribution-network investment programme promoted by Sadales tīkls AS. The total project cost was listed as €273 million. The EIB project covers investments in the electricity distribution network, including work connected with demand growth, new network users, service quality and operational efficiency.

By 2023, the company's smart electricity metering programme had installed new-generation meters for 99% of Sadales tīkls customer connection points and provided remote metering for more than one million connection points.

In May 2026, Public Broadcasting of Latvia reported that Sadales tīkls had developed a grid-balancing system designed to automatically regulate power-station operation in order to prevent overloads and voltage problems in the distribution network. The system monitors grid conditions and can reduce output from specific power stations when needed; according to the same report, during repairs or faults it could reduce the required curtailment of generation capacity by about 60–70%.

== Audit and tariff scrutiny ==
In 2018, the State Audit Office of Latvia found that some costs included in Sadales tīkls electricity distribution tariffs were not economically justified or necessary for providing distribution services. The audit led to nine recommendations for cost containment and called on the Public Utilities Commission to review the tariff calculation methodology for electricity distribution services.

The audit also raised issues about investment-planning traceability, transport and special-equipment use, employee benefits and compensation payments included in the company's cost base.

== 2022–2023 tariff debate ==
In 2022, the company's proposed tariff project became a national policy issue. The initial distribution tariff proposal provided for an average increase of 75% from July 2023, while later public and regulatory discussions reduced the expected increase.

Latvian Television's De Facto calculated that household electricity distribution in Latvia could become the most expensive in the Baltic states if the tariff project submitted by Sadales tīkls to the Public Utilities Commission took effect. The same coverage linked the tariff pressure to the cost of compensating electricity losses in distribution and transmission networks.

From 1 July 2023, electricity distribution and transmission rates in Latvia increased by 32% and 36%, respectively. The new tariff structure included a fixed component connected with maintaining connection capacity and a variable component based on electricity consumption.

In September 2023, Latvian legislation reduced the fixed capacity-maintenance part of the household electricity distribution tariff by 60% for the period from September to December 2023. Draft legislative changes for 2024–2025 introduced a gradual approach for household capacity-payment increases and new transparency requirements connected with future tariff values and infrastructure-development plans.

The OECD described the 2023 Sadales tīkls tariff decision as causing a public debate over the regulator's decision, tariff methodology and social impact. The OECD review also noted subsequent regulatory and legislative changes to reduce the impact of the tariff decision and introduce new requirements on transparency and tariff methodologies.

== Court challenge and later tariff changes ==
In May 2024, the Administrative Regional Court rejected applications challenging the Public Utilities Commission's May 2023 decision approving the Sadales tīkls electricity distribution tariffs. After the 2023 tariff changes, the fixed capacity part of the distribution tariff was reduced by about 7–11% from January 2024 compared with July 2023 levels, and the variable charge decreased by 1%.

In 2025, Sadales tīkls indicated that household distribution tariffs were unlikely to rise in 2026, while actual household payments could increase slightly after the end of existing state support.
