= Riga Hydroelectric Power Plant Crossing Pylon =

Transmission tower in Latvia

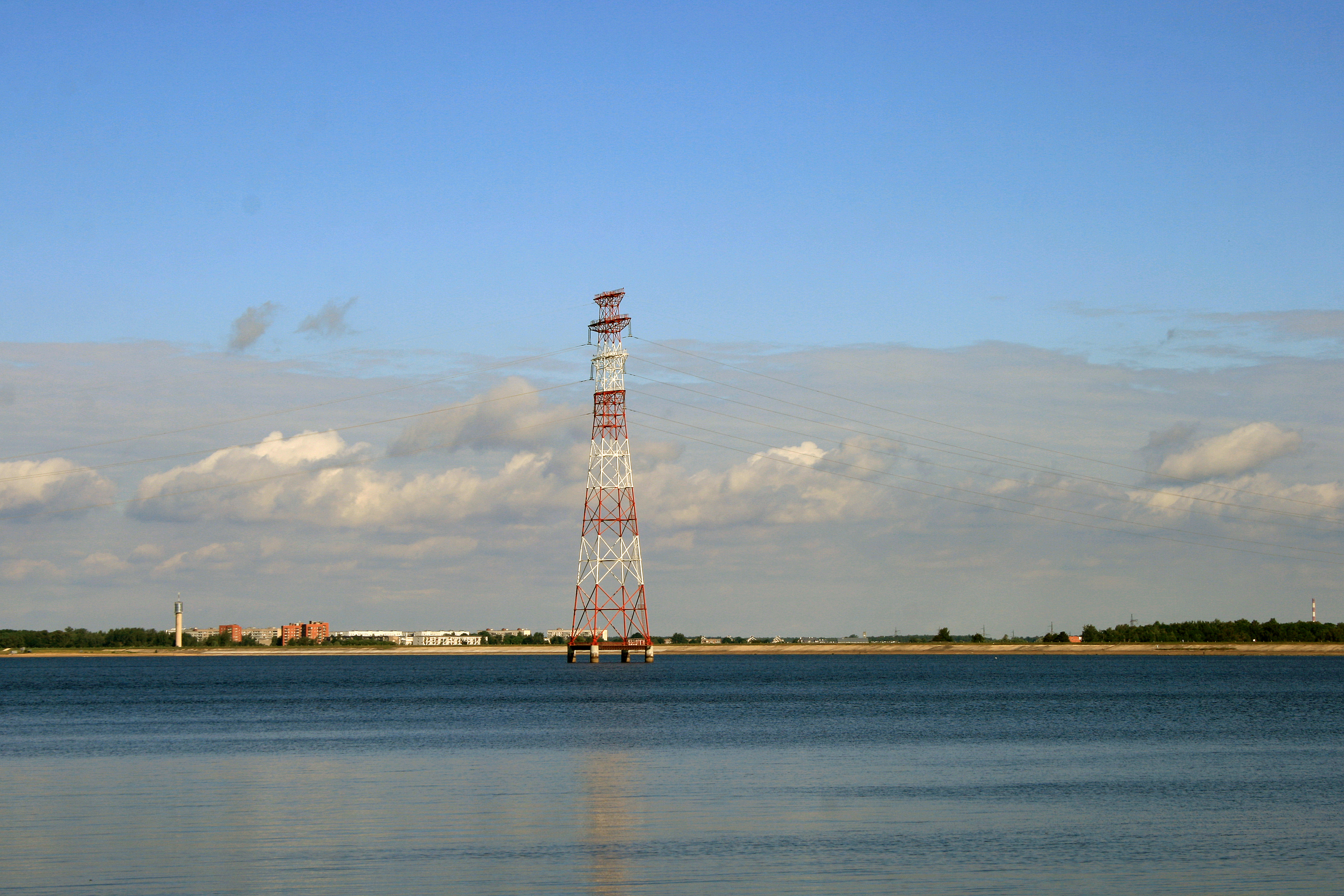
- The pylon in the Riga Reservoir (Daugava) in 2011

Location
- Country: Latvia
- Coordinates: 56°50′17″N 24°22′12″E
- To: 1974

Technical information
- Type: lattice tower and overhead power line

The Riga Hydroelectric Power Plant Crossing Pylon is an overhead powerline crossing of the Daugava River, near Salaspils in Latvia. The present crossing was built in 1974, and includes one 112-metre tall lattice tower. It is the tallest electricity pylon in Latvia.

== See also ==
- Riga Hydroelectric Power Plant
