= Ainaži =

Town in Limbaži Municipality, Latvia

Ainaži Heinaste (Estonian)
- Town
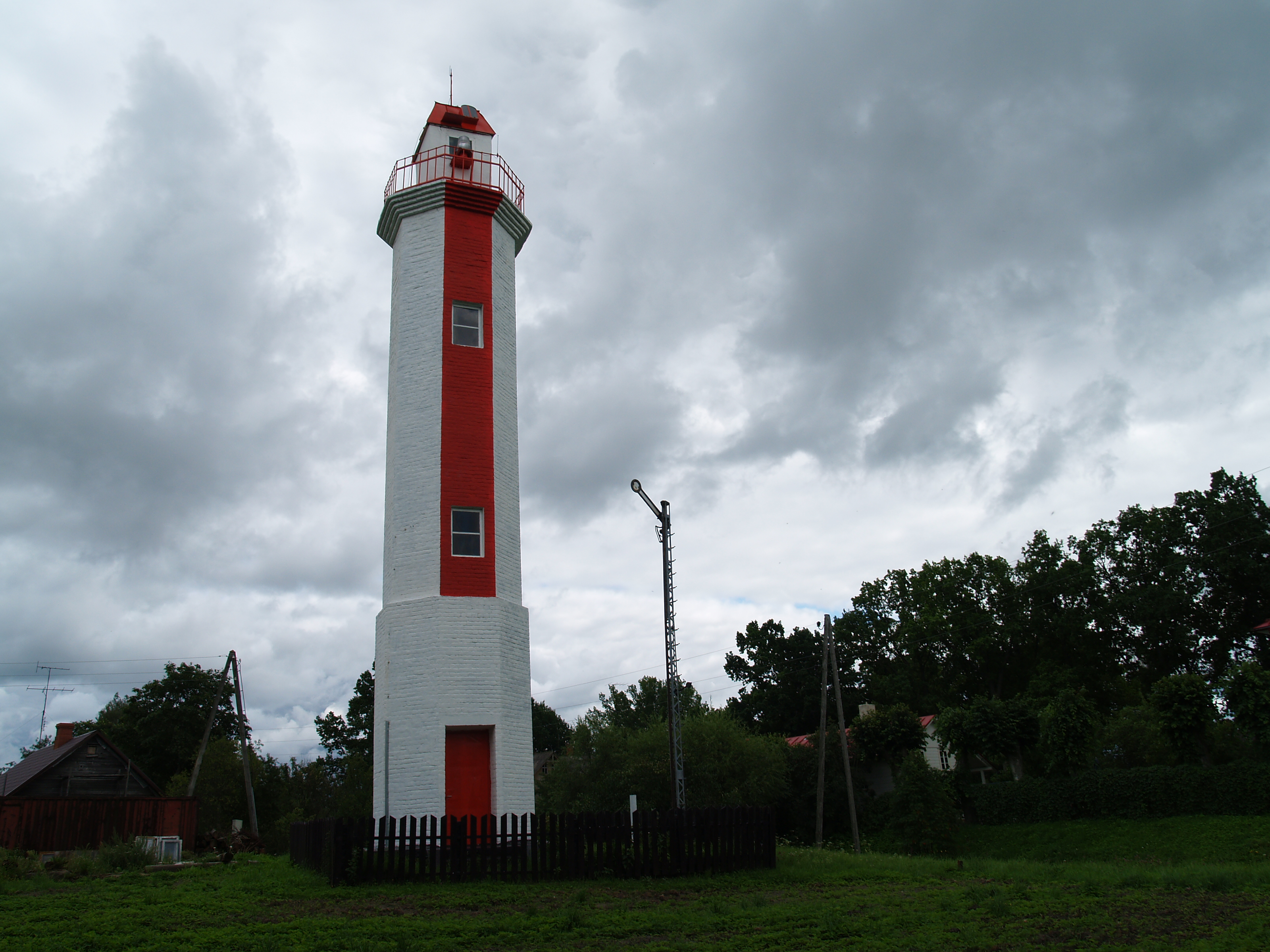
- Ainaži lighthouse

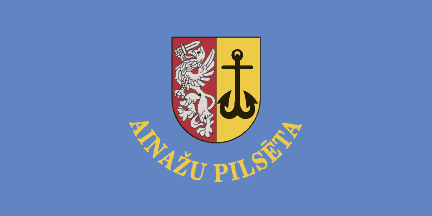
- Flag Coat of arms

- Location in Latvia
- Coordinates: 57°51′49″N 24°21′31″E
- Country: Latvia
- Municipality: Limbaži Municipality

Area
  - Total: 5.12 km^{2} (1.98 sq mi)
  - Land: 4.98 km^{2} (1.92 sq mi)
  - Water: 0.14 km^{2} (0.054 sq mi)
- Elevation: 0 m (0 ft)

Population (2026)
  - Total: 630
  - Density: 130/km^{2} (330/sq mi)
- Time zone: UTC+2 (EET)
  - Summer (DST): UTC+3 (EEST)
- Postal code: LV-4035
- Calling code: 640
- Climate: Dfb

Ainaži (Note: pronounced [aiːnaʒi]) (Note: Before the first half of the 20th century, it was internationally known nore widely by its German name Haynasch) (Estonian: Heinaste; Livonian: Āinast) is a Latvian port town by the Gulf of Riga in the Baltic Sea. Administratively, it is part of the Limbaži Municipality in the Vidzeme region of Latvia. It is located on the south side of the Estonia-Latvia international border, on the site of an ancient Livonian fishing village. Ainaži is also the extraterritorial center of the adjacent Ainaži Parish.

== Etymology ==
The name Ainaži may be derived from the Estonian language word heina(s)-tee 'hay-road'. Other possibilities include the Livonian words āina 'hay' or āinagi 'lonely, only'. Historically, the German language variants of the same name (e.g., Haynasch), were used in most written records from the late Middle Ages until the first half of the 20th century.

== History ==
Ainaži existed for centuries as a Livonian fishing village. The town itself was first mentioned in 1564, and through the ages, changed hands among various barons and estates. Ainaži entered a great period of growth in the 1870s when its history of shipbuilding and seafaring began.

In the 19th century, Vidzeme and Courland were covered with vast forests of pine trees. Ainaži's strategic position on the sea and proximity to lumber made it a perfect place for shipbuilding. In 1864, Krišjānis Valdemārs sponsored Ainaži Nautical School, the first nautical school in Livonia (today Latvia), training young Estonian and Latvian farmers to become ship captains for free. Its first headmaster was explorer Christian Dahl. The school stood for 50 years until it was destroyed in World War I. With the opening of the school and shipbuilding industry, Ainaži grew for the rest of the 19th century. From 1857 to 1913, over 50 seaworthy vessels were built in the town, and in 1902 a working port and railway station opened. By World War I, Ainaži was the fourth-largest port in all of Latvia and chief in Vidzeme, overtaking neighboring Salacgrīva. The town also had its own windmills, fish-processing plant, and brick kiln.

In World War I Ainaži was heavily damaged. The port was ruined and the entire shipping fleet destroyed. In February 1919, the Estonian army drove the Germans from Ainaži and subsequently occupied it. After the war, Ainaži became part of Latvia after its inhabitants voted for Latvia in a referendum, but Estonia's troops remained stationed there until 1920 and Estonia kept the northern section of the town, the Ikla village.

In the years of independent Republic of Latvia (1918–1940) Ainaži was revitalized. The Ainaži fleet, sunken in the war, had completely barricaded the harbor and had to be removed. The harbor was then deepened, and the port was rebuilt in 1923 with new breakers. In 1930 the Ainaži lighthouse was built.

In World War II, however, Ainaži was destroyed again. The second naval academy burned down, the port was bombed, and the warehouses were plundered. Though the port was partially rebuilt after the war, Ainaži was overshadowed by nearby Pärnu, and lost its fish-processing factory to Salacgrīva.

After Latvia's independence was restored in 1991, a wind turbine was built in Ainaži, as well as a customs house on the Estonian border. Today, the building of the naval school hosts the Museum of Ainaži Naval School (Ainažu jūrskolas muzejs), dedicated to the history of the school and the tradition of shipbuilding along the Vidzeme coast.

== Climate ==
Ainaži has a humid continental climate (Köppen Dfb).

Climate data for Ainaži (1991-2020 normals, extremes 1906–present)
Month	Jan	Feb	Mar	Apr	May	Jun	Jul	Aug	Sep	Oct	Nov	Dec	Year
Record high °C (°F)	8.1 (46.6)	10.8 (51.4)	18.3 (64.9)	26.6 (79.9)	29.8 (85.6)	33.2 (91.8)	33.7 (92.7)	33.2 (91.8)	30.0 (86.0)	22.0 (71.6)	15.4 (59.7)	10.5 (50.9)	33.7 (92.7)
Mean daily maximum °C (°F)	−0.4 (31.3)	−0.7 (30.7)	2.9 (37.2)	9.6 (49.3)	15.3 (59.5)	18.9 (66.0)	21.9 (71.4)	21.2 (70.2)	16.5 (61.7)	10.1 (50.2)	4.7 (40.5)	1.6 (34.9)	10.1 (50.2)
Daily mean °C (°F)	−2.6 (27.3)	−3.3 (26.1)	−0.3 (31.5)	5.2 (41.4)	10.6 (51.1)	14.8 (58.6)	17.7 (63.9)	17.0 (62.6)	12.6 (54.7)	7.1 (44.8)	2.6 (36.7)	−0.4 (31.3)	6.7 (44.2)
Mean daily minimum °C (°F)	−5.4 (22.3)	−6.5 (20.3)	−4.0 (24.8)	0.6 (33.1)	4.9 (40.8)	9.6 (49.3)	12.5 (54.5)	11.9 (53.4)	8.2 (46.8)	3.8 (38.8)	0.0 (32.0)	−2.9 (26.8)	2.7 (36.9)
Record low °C (°F)	−35.7 (−32.3)	−35.3 (−31.5)	−34.4 (−29.9)	−18.8 (−1.8)	−7.5 (18.5)	−1.3 (29.7)	2.0 (35.6)	0.2 (32.4)	−4.8 (23.4)	−13.8 (7.2)	−18.7 (−1.7)	−37.1 (−34.8)	−37.1 (−34.8)
Average precipitation mm (inches)	45.9 (1.81)	34.3 (1.35)	32.0 (1.26)	32.1 (1.26)	41.7 (1.64)	64.9 (2.56)	54.0 (2.13)	79.5 (3.13)	58.6 (2.31)	79.3 (3.12)	62.5 (2.46)	53.7 (2.11)	638.5 (25.14)
Average precipitation days (≥ 1.0 mm)	10	8	8	7	7	9	7	10	9	12	11	11	109
Average relative humidity (%)	88.0	86.4	81.5	75.3	73.9	77.9	78.9	79.0	81.8	84.5	87.2	87.8	81.9
Source 1: LVĢMC
Source 2: NOAA (humidity and precipitation days 1991-2020)

Coastal temperature data for Ainaži
Month	Jan	Feb	Mar	Apr	May	Jun	Jul	Aug	Sep	Oct	Nov	Dec	Year
Average sea temperature °C (°F)	1.7 (35.06)	0.3 (32.54)	0.0 (32.00)	2.1 (35.78)	8.7 (47.66)	14.7 (58.46)	19.4 (66.92)	18.6 (65.48)	15.1 (59.18)	11.1 (51.98)	7.6 (45.68)	4.1 (39.38)	8.6 (47.51)
Source 1: Seatemperature.net

== Economy ==
The most important industries are forestry, woodworking, and trade. In addition, its location at the Latvia-Estonia border on the A1 road (Latvia), which is part of the Via Baltica international highway, favors transit/transport industries.

== Demographics ==
The population of Ainaži and the surrounding area in 2005 was 1,794 people, the smallest official town of Vidzeme. Latvians made up 92% of the inhabitants, Russians 3%, Estonians 2%, and others 4%. From 2004 the population had decreased by 5.08% (96 inhabitants).

Historical population

Year	Pop.	±%
1935	918	—
1959	1,102	+20.0%
1970	839	−23.9%
1979	1,096	+30.6%

Year	Pop.	±%
1989	1,257	+14.7%
2000	1,245	−1.0%
2011	833	−33.1%
2021	650	−22.0%

Source: Latvian Geospatial Information Agency

== Gallery ==
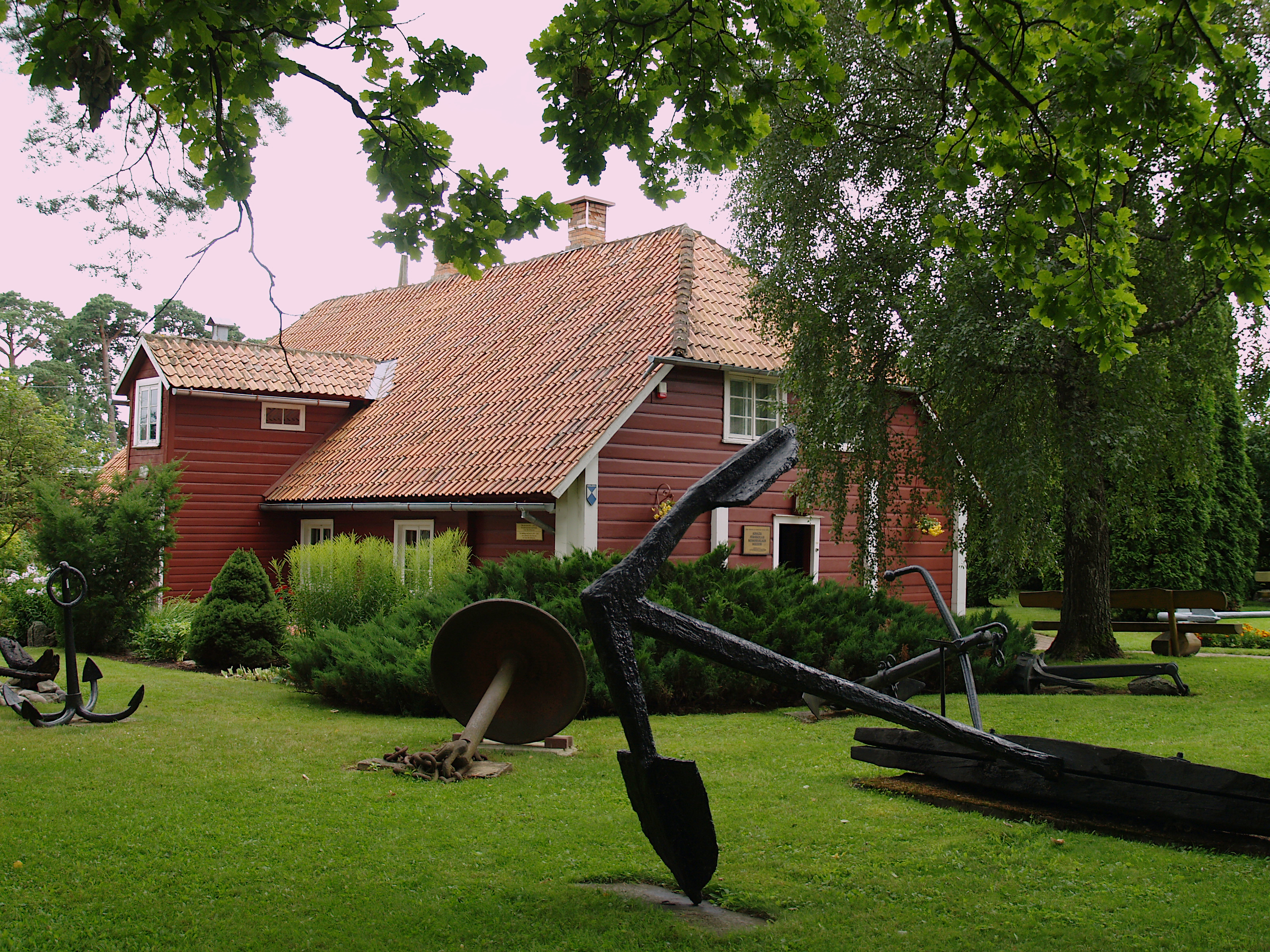
Building of the former Ainaži nautical school (now a museum)

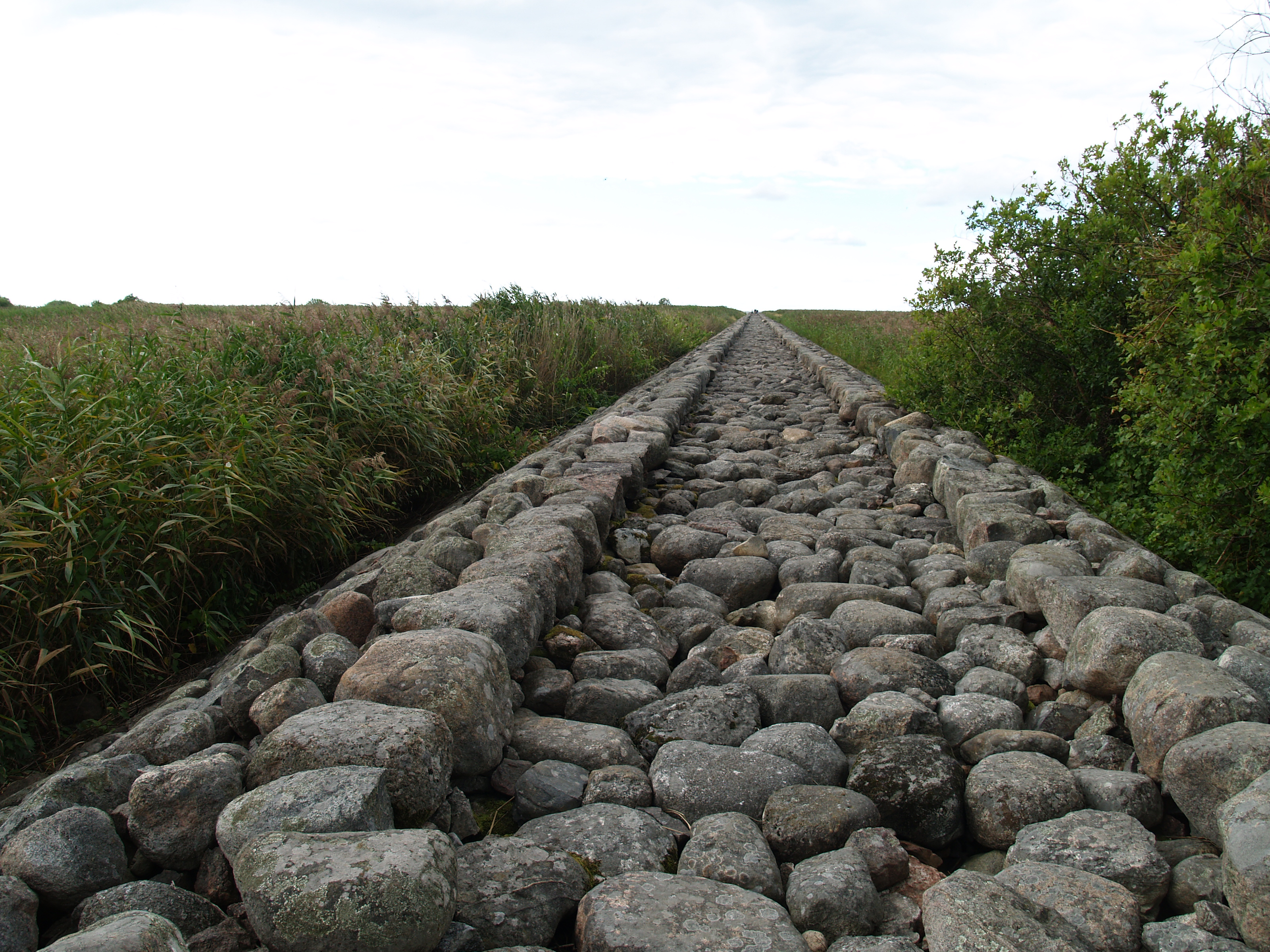
The North Pier

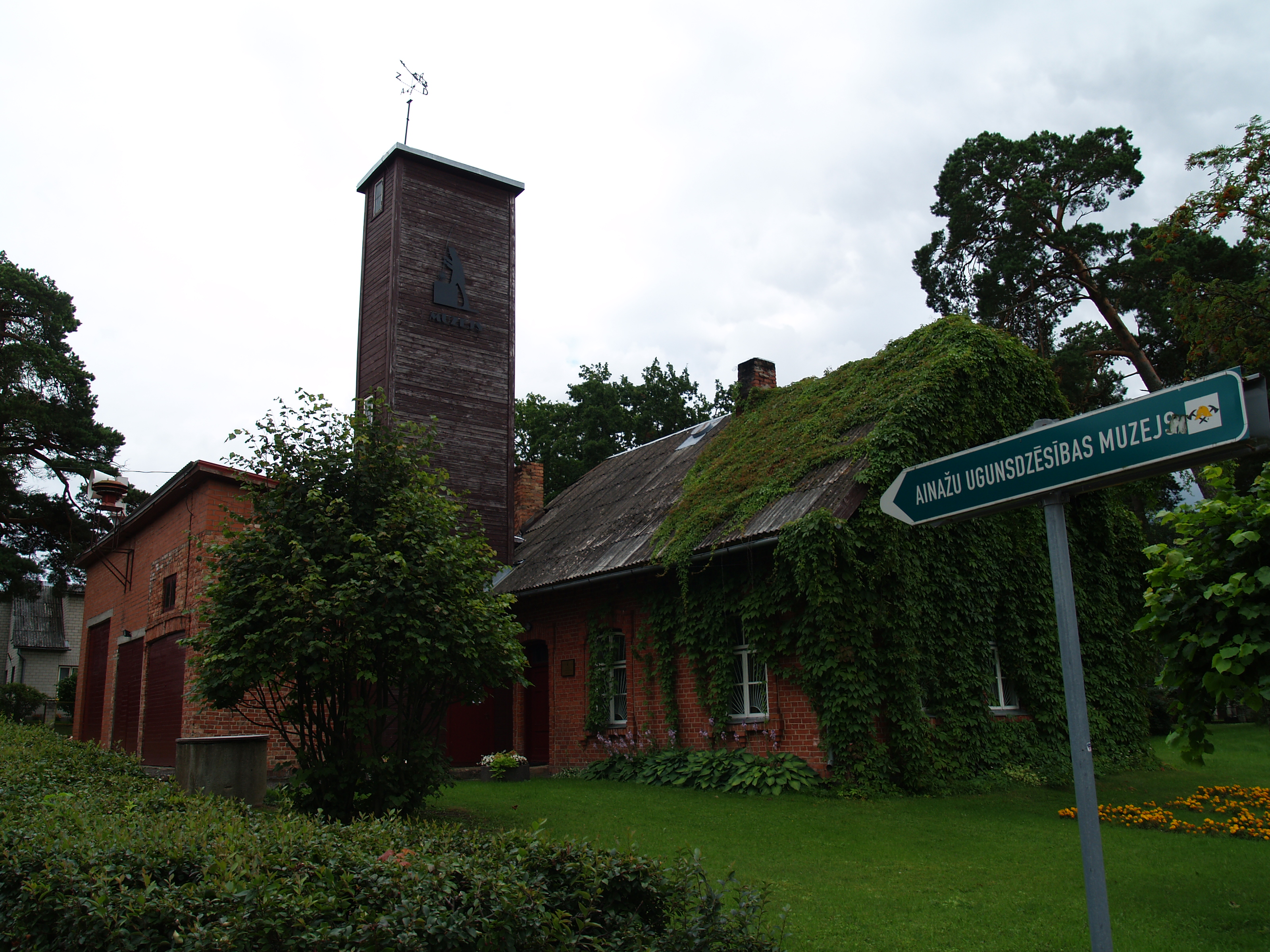
Firefighting museum

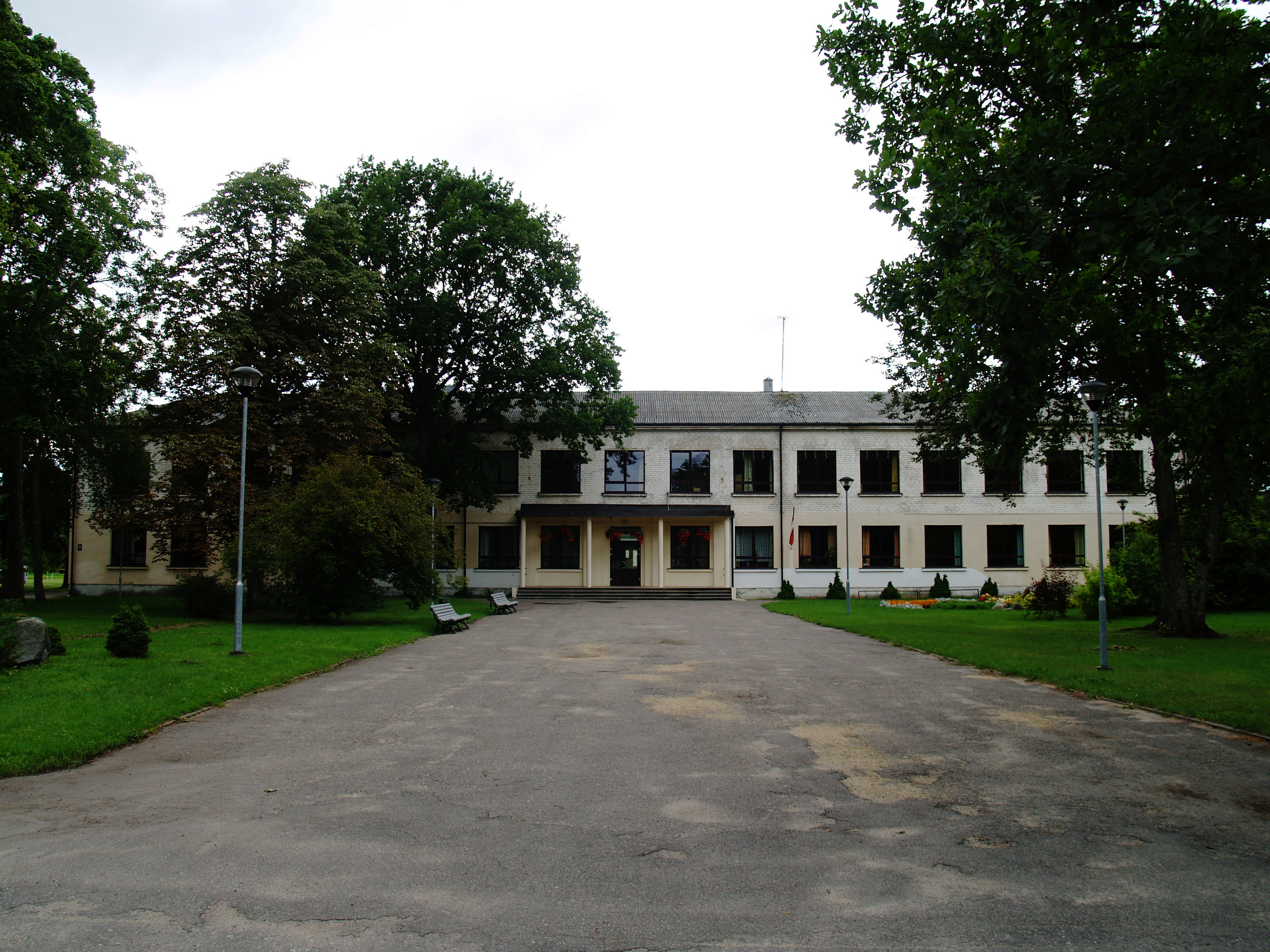
Elementary school

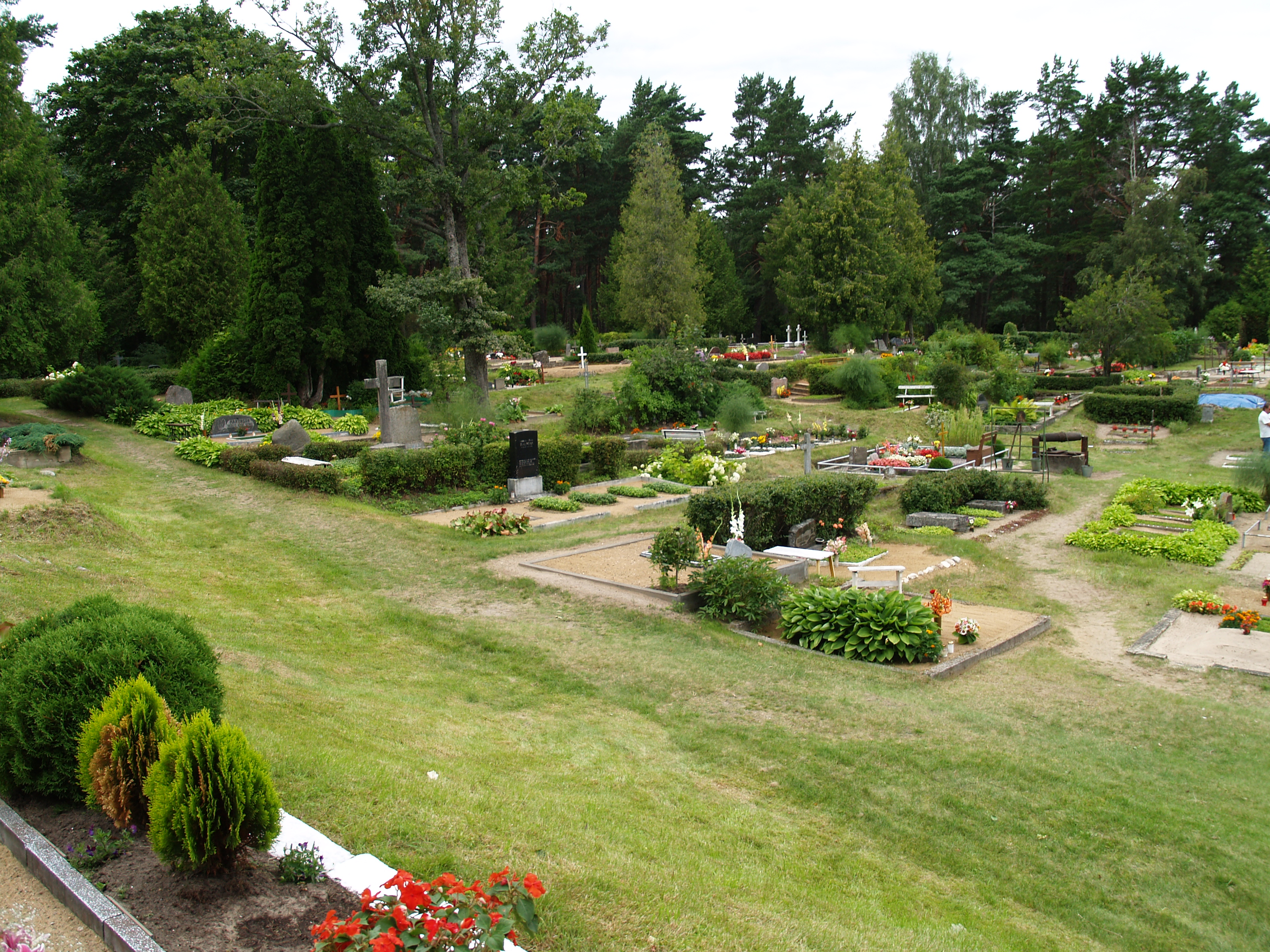
Cemetery

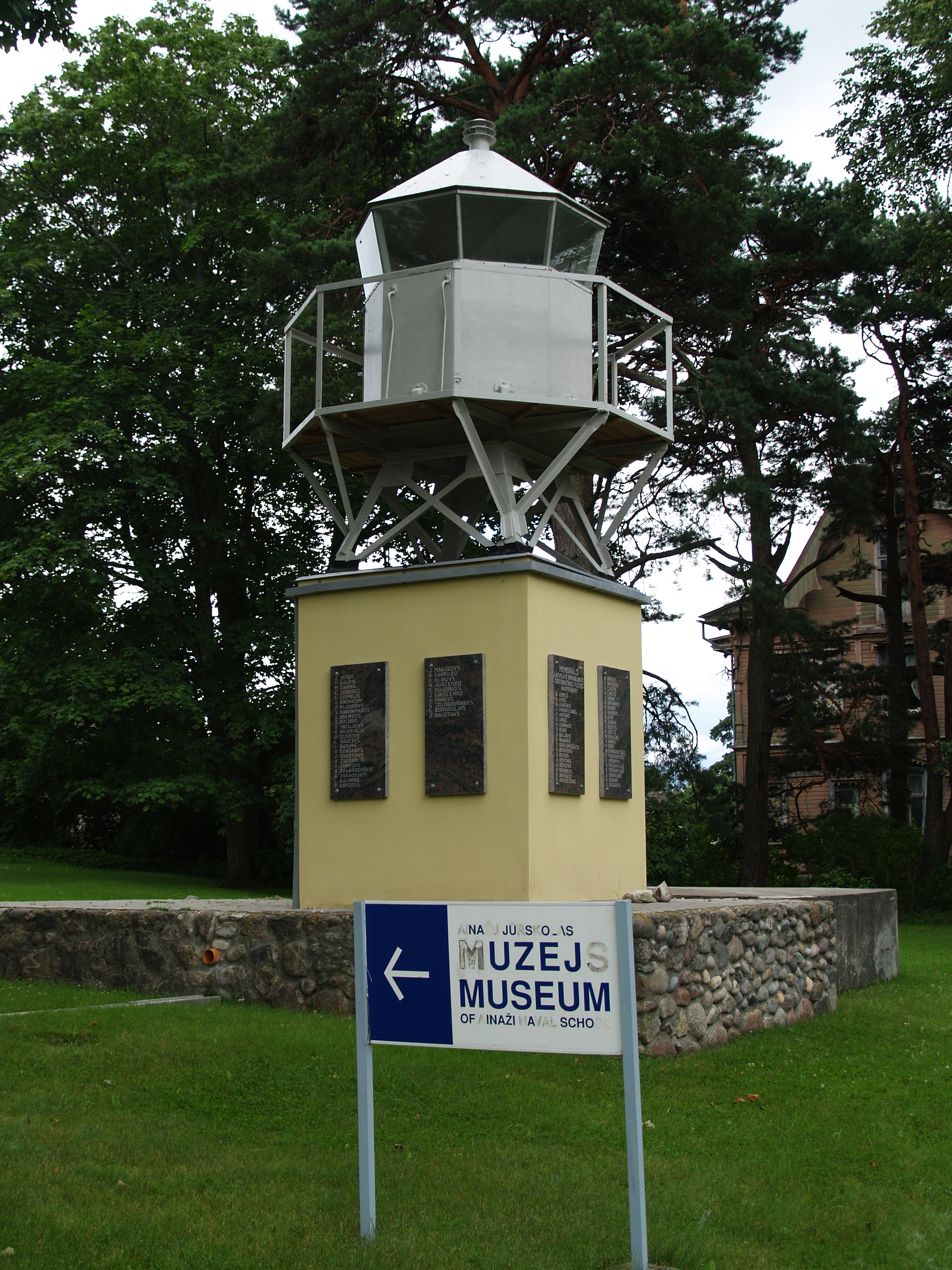
Memorial to seamen

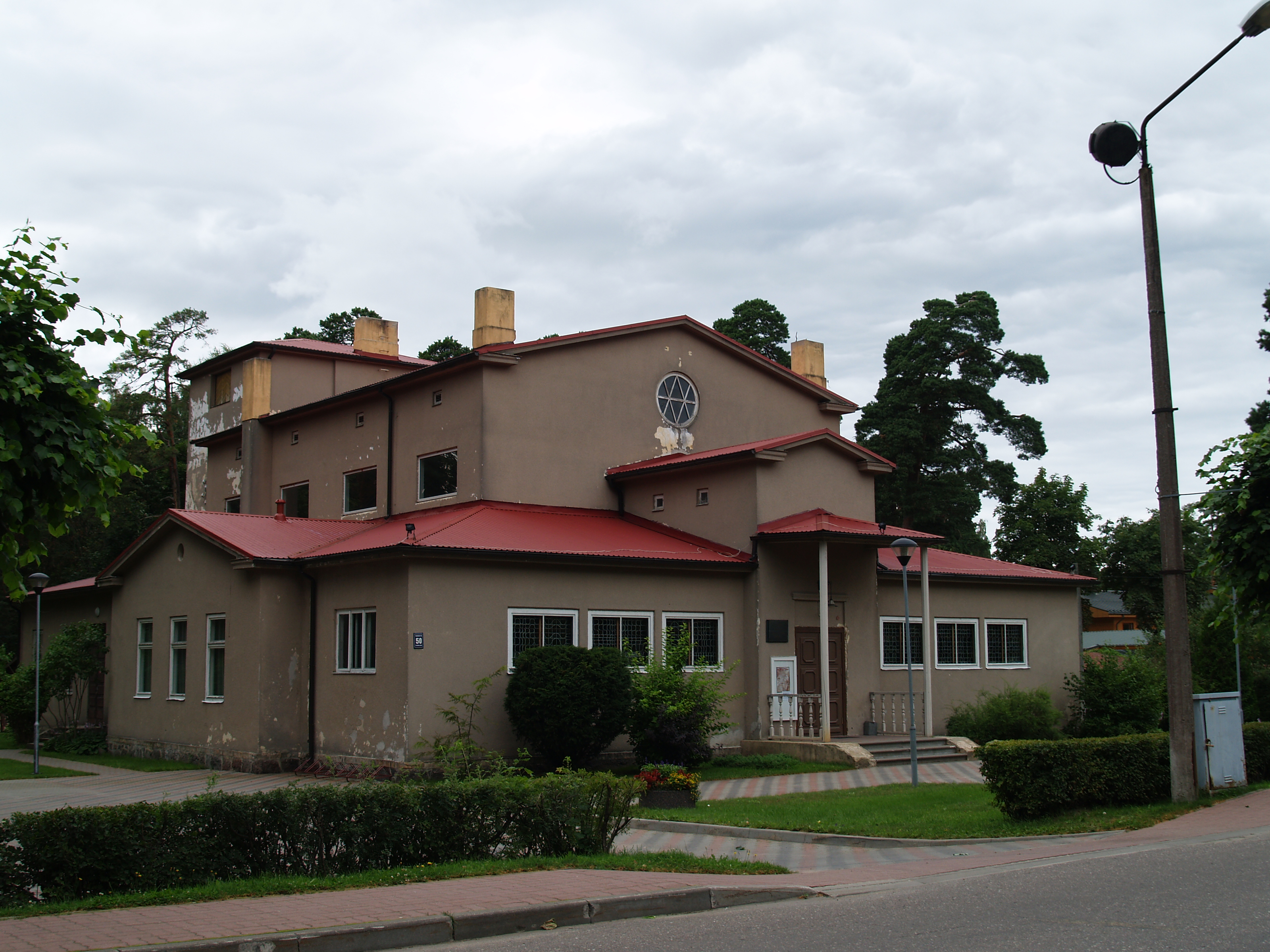
Cultural center

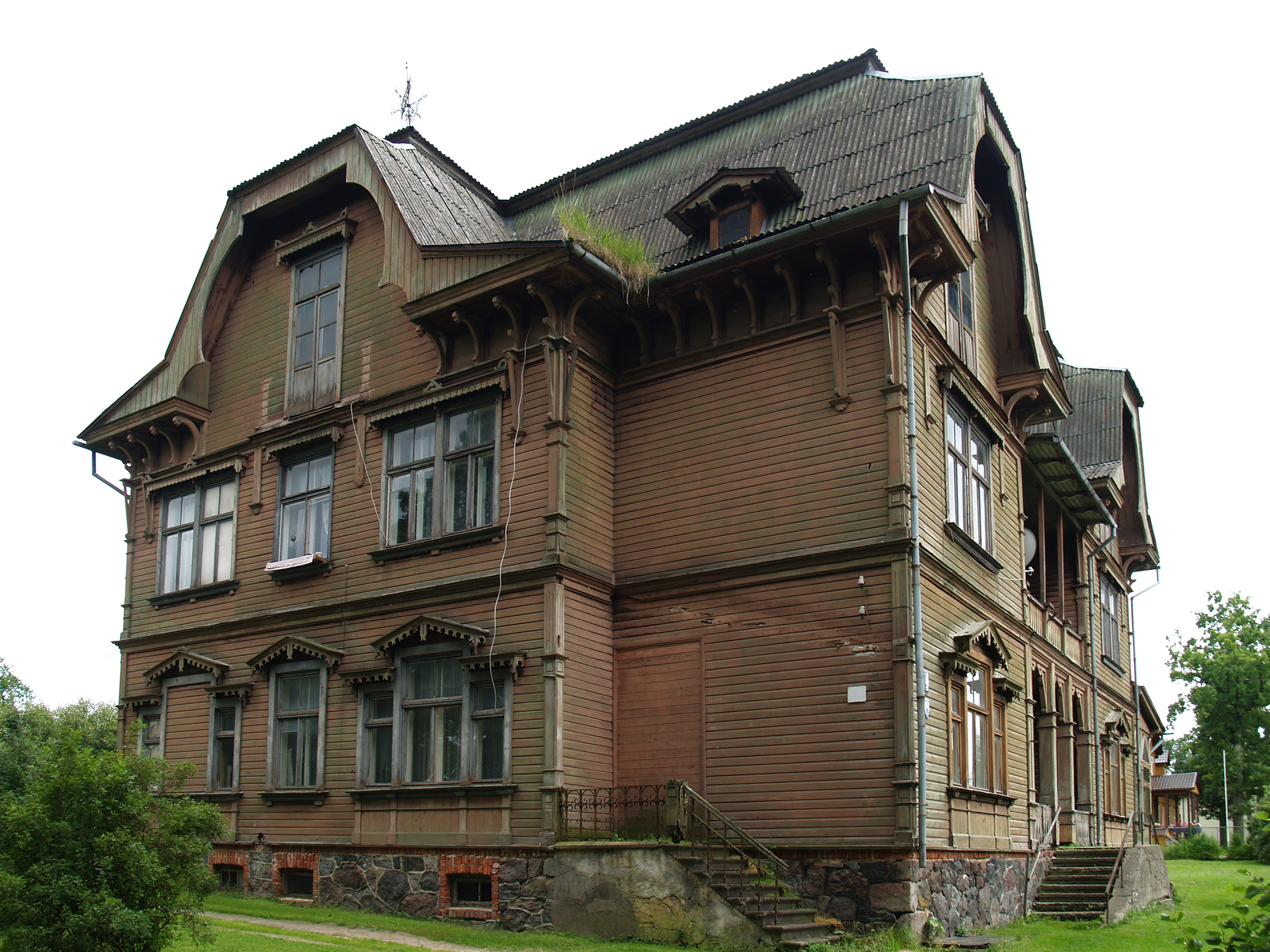
A manor

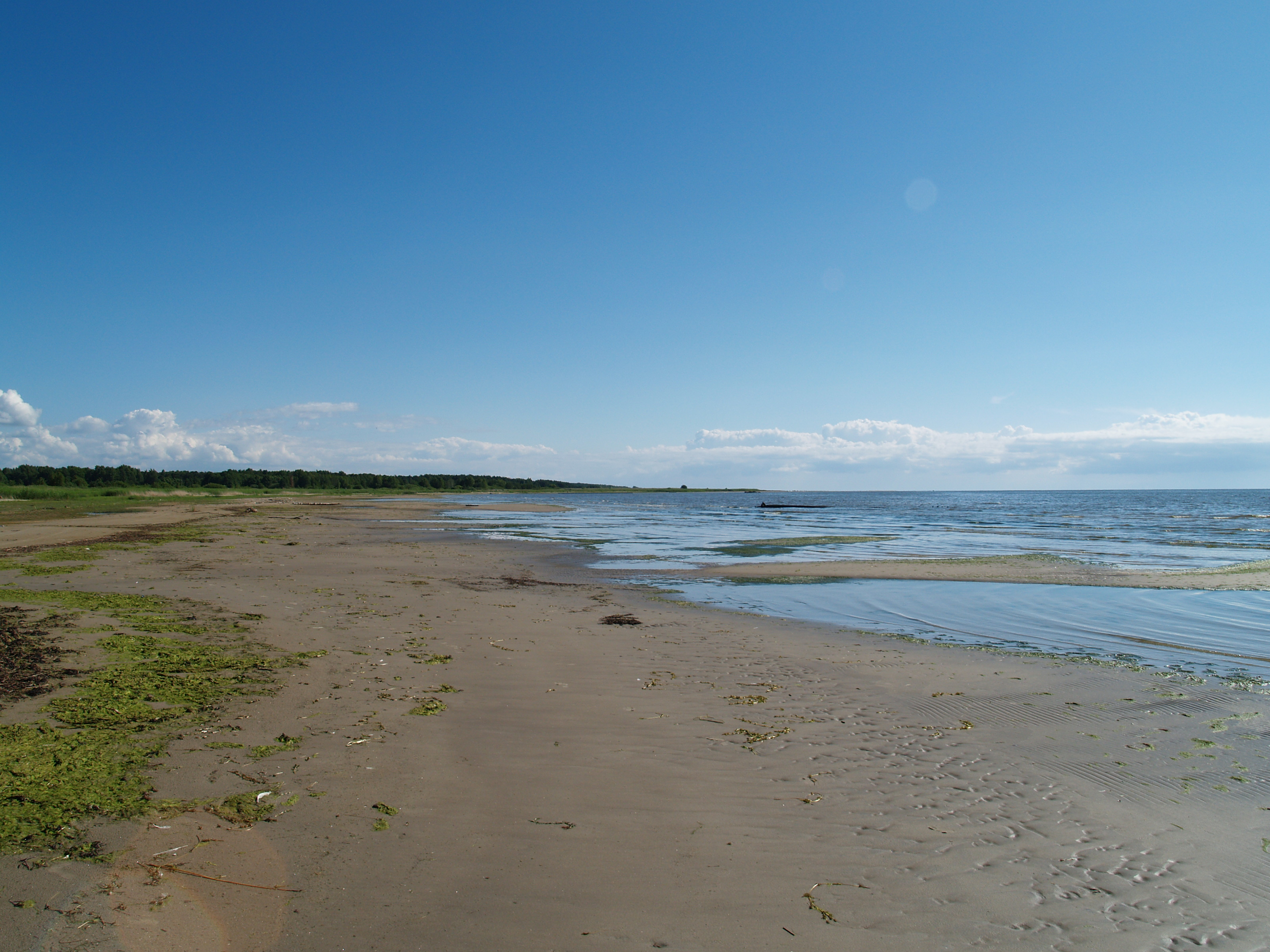
Beach

== Sister cities ==
- Häädemeeste Parish, Estonia
- Cēsis, Latvia
- Miežiškiai, Lithuania
