= Ainaži Nautical School =

School in present-day Latvia

Coordinates: 57.8651°N 24.3604°E

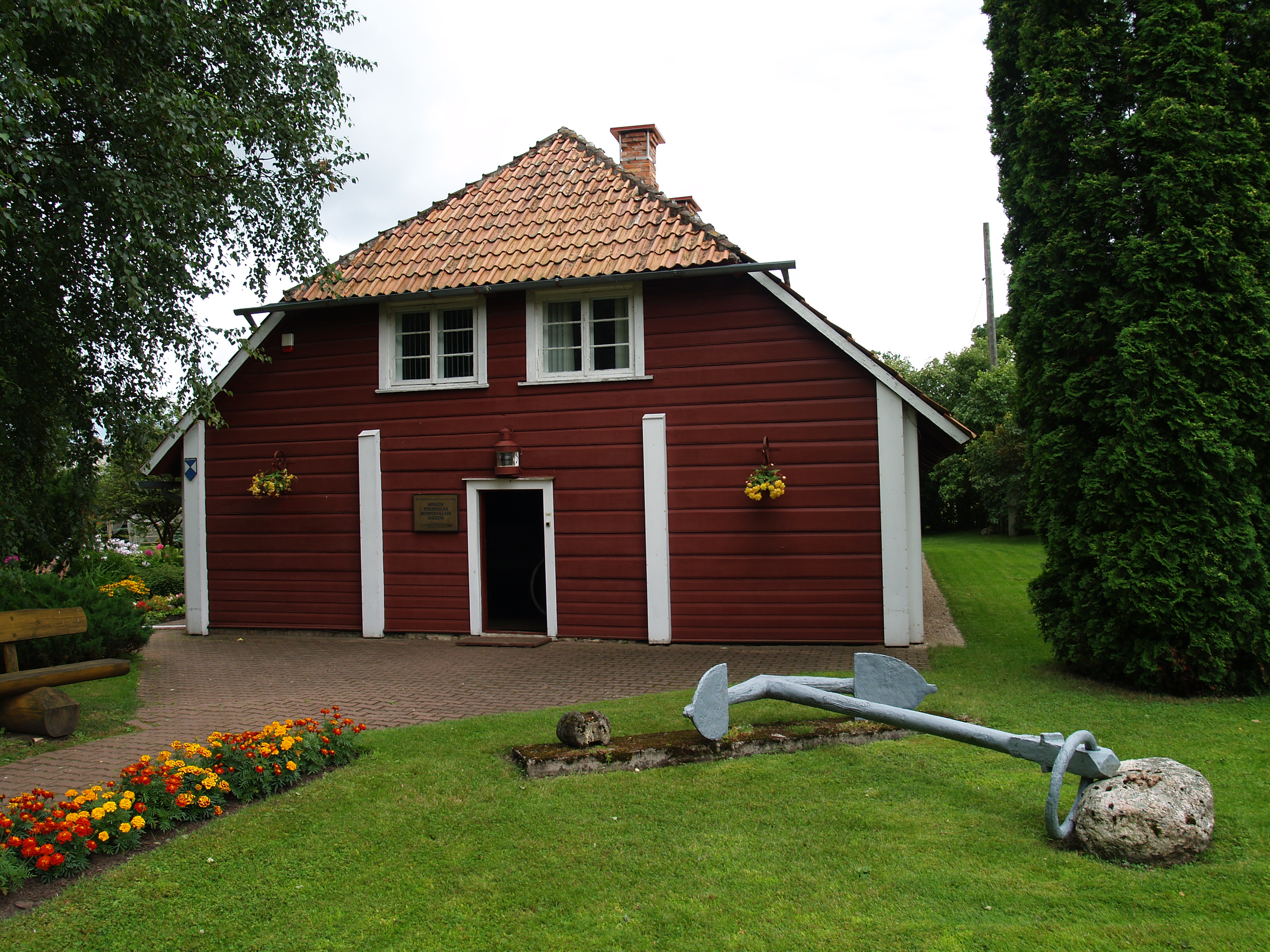
The original building of the Ainaži nautical school, today a museum

Ainaži Nautical School was a school that trained seamen and sea captains, founded in 1864 in Ainaži, present-day Latvia.

The school was founded on 23 November 1864 by Krišjānis Valdemārs in Ainaži, which at the time was part of the Russian Empire and today is located in Latvia, close to the border of Estonia. The school was founded with the aim of providing training opportunities in the Estonian and Latvian languages for local youth. This was done in order both to improve the economy of the Latvian lands and integrate the country more closely with Western Europe through seafaring and trade. Thus, it was part of the First Latvian National Awakening. The school was financed by a group of local ship-owners. It was the first such school in Latvia, and would inspire the establishment of as many as 40 such schools across the Russian Empire, eleven of which were within the borders of present-day Latvia. The first headmaster of Ainaži Nautical School was the explorer Christian Dahl. Nikolai Raudsepp also taught at the school.

== Development ==
The school initially operated without an official licence in quarters owned by farmer Juris Veide. It opened with two students; by 1 December 1864, enrolment had risen to 13. Applicants had to be literate and to have served at sea at least as a cabin boy. Because the school initially had no examination commission, students who completed their studies travelled to Riga to take their examinations. The school received an official licence in 1867. Under a law on nautical schools approved on 27 June 1867, instruction was free, admission was open regardless of age or financial circumstances, and teaching was conducted in students' mother tongues.

During their second year, students studied mathematics, geography, navigation, astronomy, shipbuilding, English, admiralty law and first aid. A new school building was completed in 1870, when the school received second-category status; in 1880 it became a third-category deep-sea navigation school. Practical training included voyages aboard the sailing ship Katarina, while an expedition in 1876–1877 reached the lower course of the Ob and the Arctic Ocean.

== Closure and museum ==
Between 1864 and 1898, the school enrolled 2,261 students, 741 of whom received captain's or helmsman's diplomas. During World War I, it was evacuated in 1915 to the Black Sea coast near Kherson. It returned to Ainaži in 1919 but closed that year; the increasing importance of steamships was one factor in the decision.

The Museum of Ainaži Naval School opened to visitors on 20 July 1969 in the restored former family home of captain Juris Veide, the building used during the school's early years. It is a structural unit of the Museum of the History of Riga and Navigation.
