= St. John the Forerunner Church, Riga =

St. John the Forerunner Church
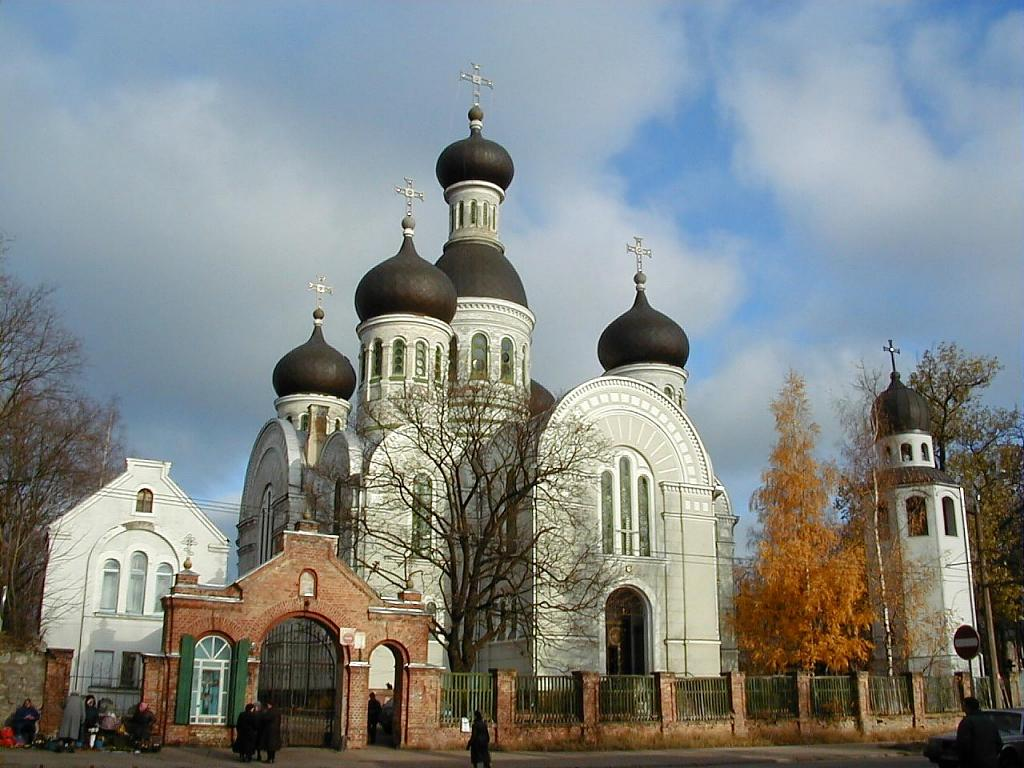

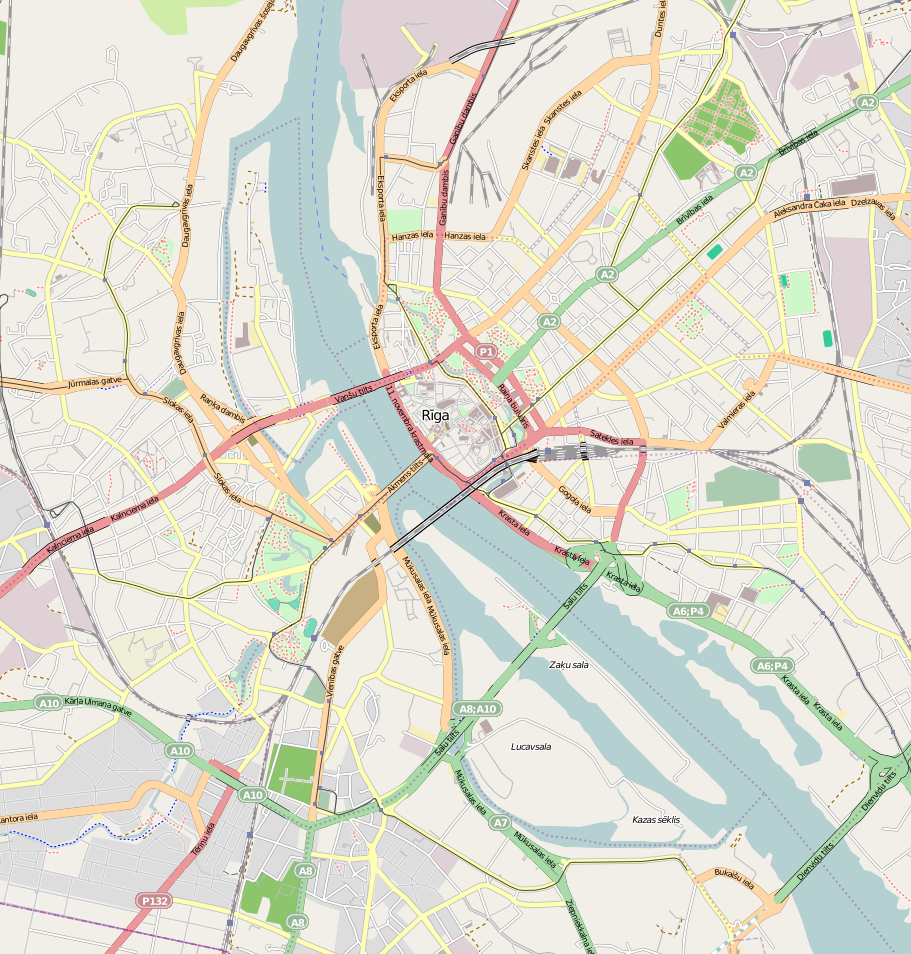
- Location within Riga
- 56°56′33.93″N 24°8′50.29″E
- Location: Riga
- Country: Latvia
- Denomination: Eastern Orthodox

St. John the Forerunner Church (Latvian: Svētā Jāņa Priekšteča pareizticīgo baznīca) is an Eastern Orthodox church in Riga, the capital of Latvia. The church is situated at the address 21 Kalna Street.
