= Miežiškiai =

- Town
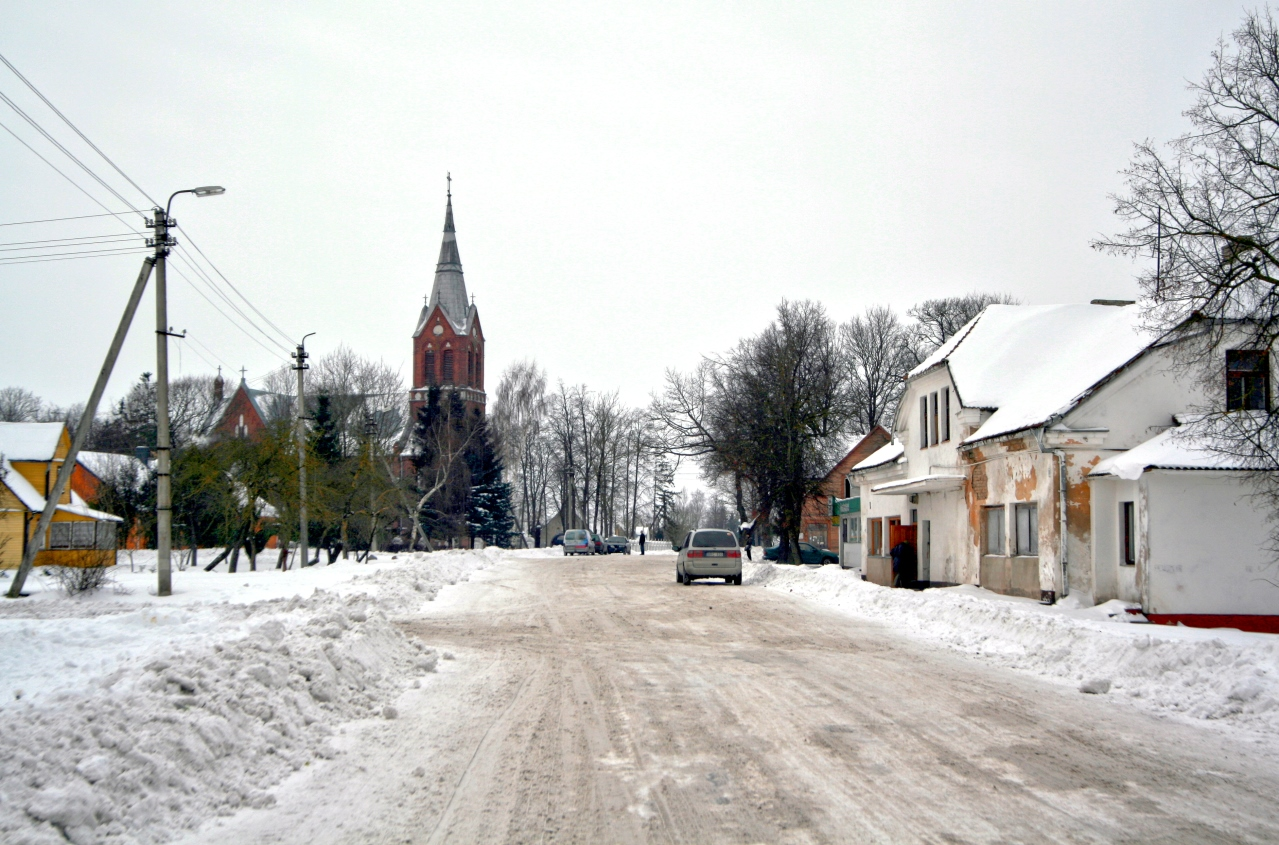

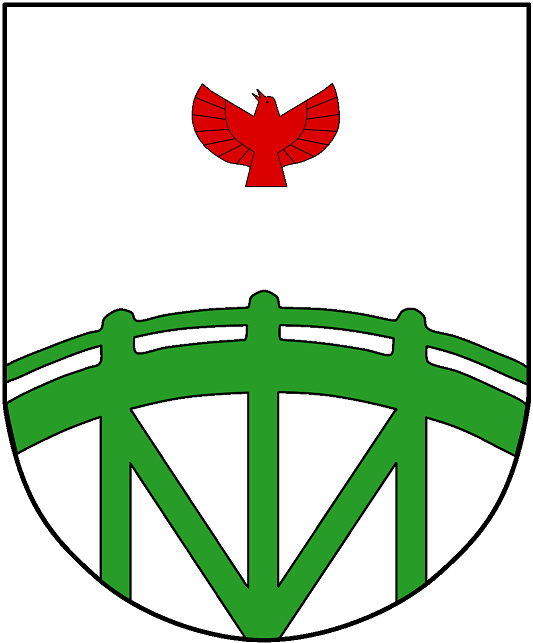
- Coat of arms

- Location within Lithuania
- Coordinates: 55°40′30″N 24°32′0″E
- Country: Lithuania
- County: Panevėžys County

Population (2011)
  - Total: 651
- Time zone: UTC+2 (EET)
  - Summer (DST): UTC+3 (EEST)

Miežiškiai (Polish: Mieżyszki) is a small town in Panevėžys County, in northeastern Lithuania. According to the 2011 census, the town has a population of 651 people.
