= Riga Hydroelectric Power Plant =

Hydroelectric power plant in Latvia

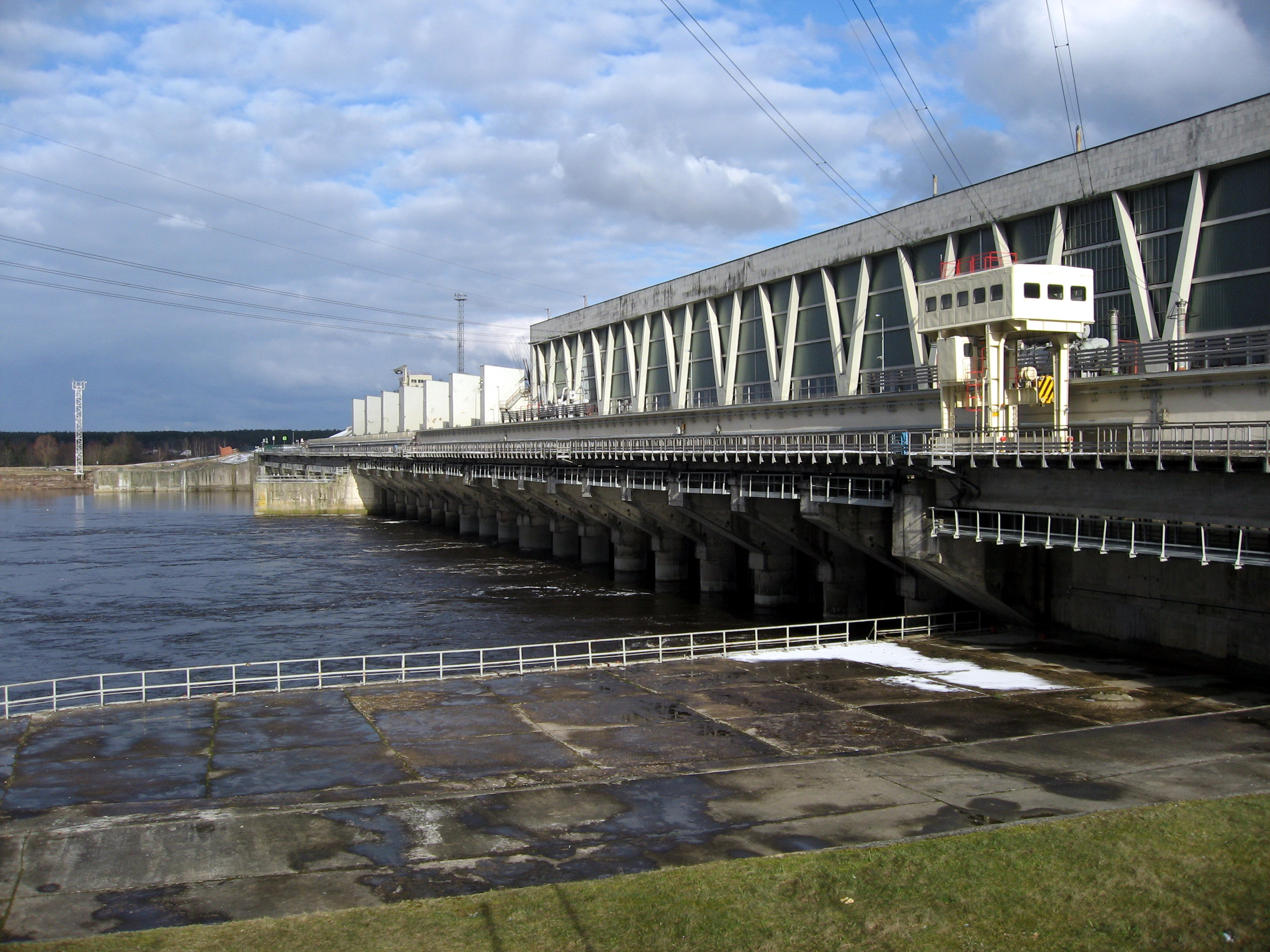
- Riga Hydroelectric Power Plant

- Location within Latvia
- Country: Latvia
- Location: Salaspils
- Coordinates: 56°51′8″N 24°16′19″E
- Status: Operational

Power Station
- Operator: Latvenergo
- Commission date: 1974
- Type: Conventional
- Turbines: 6
- Installed capacity: 402 MW
- Capacity factor: 16% (2018)
- 2018 generation: 564 GW·h

Riga Hydroelectric Power Plant (Latvian: Rīgas hidroelektrostacija, shortened Rīgas HES) in Latvia is located just beyond Riga's southern border. It is geographically located in the town of Salaspils. Total installed power generating capacity is 402 MW. There are six generators, two transformers and two 330 kV power lines (to Salaspils and Bišuciems).

== History ==
The Riga Hydroelectric Power Plant was put into operation in 1974. In order to build Riga HES, a dam was constructed across the Daugava River through the middle of Doles Sala, half of which has since been flooded to make room for Riga Reservoir. Along with Doles Sala, several other smaller islands also drowned when the reservoir was filled. The dam was built in the late 1970s. Aside from its main purpose of keeping the reservoir contained, its top is used as a motor vehicle highway. A railroad was also constructed on the dam, but it was utilized only during construction of the powerplant and was demolished at the beginning of the 21st century. This is because there are no existing railroads on the Daugava's left bank. This railroad began at Salaspils railway station, and ended approximately in the middle of Doles Sala.

== Description ==
There is a powerline pylon in the middle of reservoir, it carries two 330 kV lines (from Salaspils to Jelgava and from Salaspils to Rīgas HES), shore to shore distance there is approximately 1 kilometre (0.62 mi).

Rigas HES is an important part of Riga's development. It is the primary source of electricity in Riga, while Riga reservoir is a source of tap water for the majority of Riga residents. In addition, the power plant is used as a compensation plant for TEC2 thermal power plant to regulate voltage in electrical networks and to compensate the power deficiencies.

The power plant is operated by Latvenergo.

== See also ==
- Riga Hydroelectric Power Plant Crossing Pylon
