= Germany–Latvia relations =

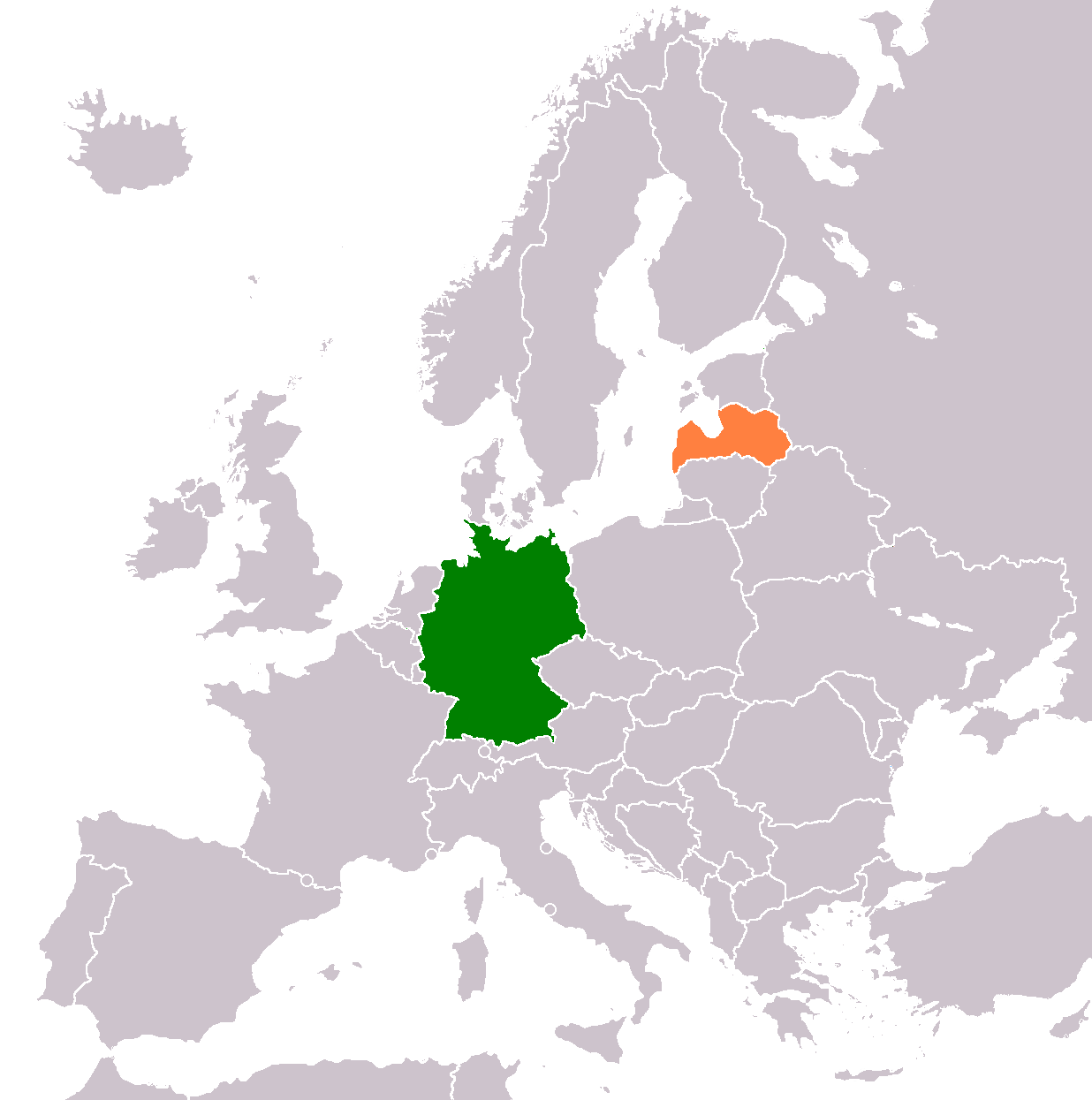

- Germany: Latvia

Germany–Latvia relations are the bilateral relations between Germany and Latvia. Both countries are members of the Council of the Baltic Sea States, the Organization for Security and Cooperation in Europe (OSCE), OECD, the Council of Europe, NATO and the European Union. Latvia has also been part of the Eurozone since 2014.

== History ==
=== Middle Ages ===
In the 12th century, the first Low German trading and mission stations were established on the Daugava. In the 13th century, Riga was founded by the Bremen canon Albert of Buxhoeveden, Bishop of Livonia. Additionally, the subjugation of the Baltic pagans began, led by the Livonian Brothers of the Sword (later the Teutonic Order).

=== Early Modern Period to the 19th Century ===
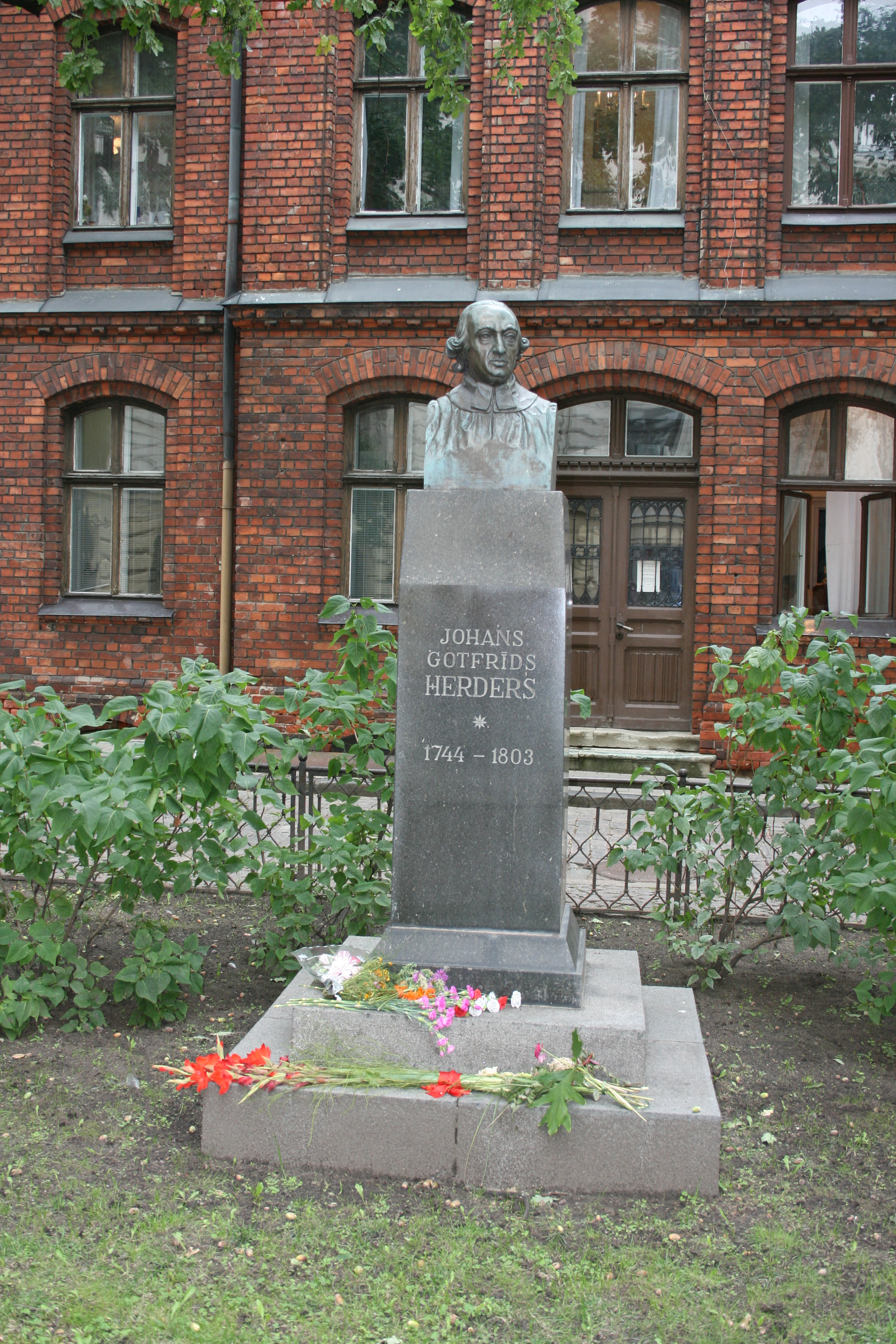
The Herder Monument in Riga

Since this period (which can also be seen in the context of the German eastward expansion), there has been a Baltic German minority in Latvia. Although their numbers remained small, they played a significant role in Latvia's development. For instance, Johann Gottfried Herder worked in Riga for a time, where he translated Latvian Dainas (folk songs) into German and promoted their recognition as cultural heritage through publication. The linguist August Bielenstein, born in Mitau, also studied Dainas and made significant contributions to the research of the Latvian language and culture. Furthermore, he initiated the first Latvian Song Festival in Dobele in 1870.Susanne Dell: Lettland. Munich 2006, p. 18 ff. Conversely, Kārlis Ulmanis, the first Prime Minister of independent Latvia, studied at the Leipzig University, among others; the Latvian "national poet" Rainis attended the German Gymnasium in Riga and later translated Goethe's Faust into Latvian. The Baltic Germans were able to largely maintain their prominent position under various rulers over many centuries.

=== Late 19th Century and World War I ===
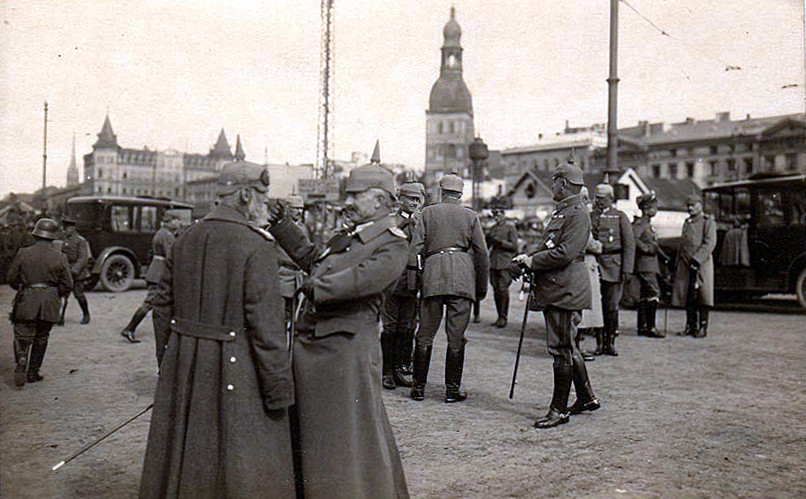
German officers in Riga during World War I

Towards the end of the 19th century, however, there was increasing Russification within the Tsarist Empire, which Latvia was part of at the time. Additionally, a Latvian national sentiment emerged, which was strongly directed against the dominant Baltic German upper class. During the German occupation of the Baltics in World War I (Riga was captured by German troops in September 1917), plans arose to establish a Baltic German-dominated state (United Baltic Duchy) under Imperial German protection, with German settlers intended to displace the Latvians. After the defeat of the German Empire and Latvia's successful declaration of independence, this wartime behavior was interpreted by many Latvians as treason. 1918–1940: From the Republic's Founding to World War II Through land reform laws, large Baltic German estates in Latvia were largely expropriated in favor of landless Latvian peasants. However, unlike other states in Central and Eastern Europe that pursued repressive policies toward their national minorities after World War I, Latvia granted its minorities cultural autonomy. Diplomatic relations with Germany were established through an agreement signed in Berlin on July 15, 1920.

=== Period of Foreign Rule (1940–1990) ===
==== 1940/1941: Soviet Occupation ====
The 1939 Molotov–Ribbentrop Pact provided for the resettlement of Baltic Germans, whom National Socialist ideologues considered "racially valuable," into territories defined by the treaty as German spheres of influence. This resettlement was carried out that same year. Latvia, on the other hand, had been assigned to the Soviet sphere of influence under the agreement and was occupied by the Red Army in 1940. This effectively ended bilateral relations between Germany and Latvia as two sovereign states for several decades. Since the Molotov–Ribbentrop Pact remained secret at the time, Germany's role in the Red Army's invasion was unknown to most Latvians.

==== 1941–1945: Occupation by Nazi Germany ====
From 1941 to 1945, during the invasion of the Soviet Union, Latvia was occupied by Germany and became part of the Reichskommissariat Ostland. Starting in 1941, a segment of the Latvian population collaborated with the Germans. To some, the Germans appeared as liberators from the Stalinist terror they had experienced in 1940/1941; other collaborators were racists or enthusiastic National Socialists. The extent to which Latvian activities in the interest of Nazi Germany were performed voluntarily remains a subject of debate. There is a fluid transition from truly voluntary work for the Germans to "voluntary" service under false pretenses (by so-called Hilfswillige) and, ultimately, to forced labor performed by Latvians for Germany within Latvia, in other occupied territories, and in the German Reich itself. German occupation policy was viewed negatively by Latvia's Jewish population, which was almost entirely annihilated in the Holocaust, by ethnic Russians living in Latvia who were classified as "subhumans" by Nazi racial ideologues (unlike the Balts, who were considered kindred blood), and by anti-fascist Latvians.

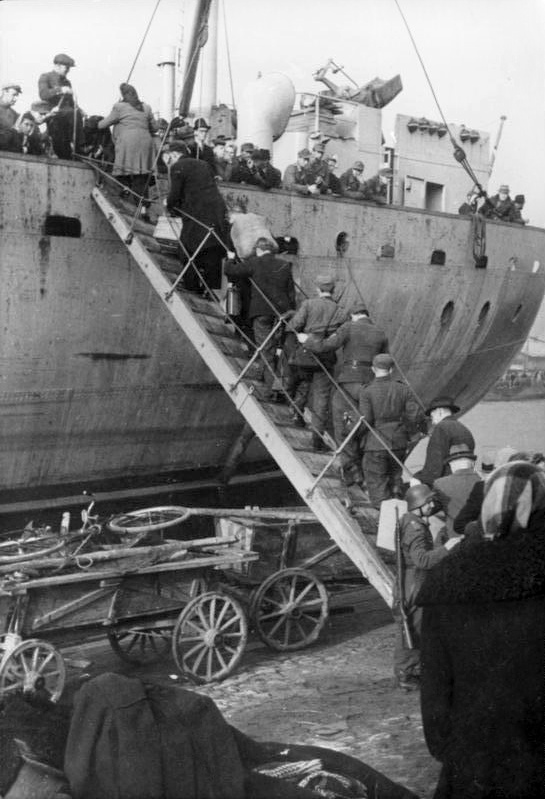
German civilians and Wehrmacht personnel leaving the port of Windau by ship.

Until May 8, 1945, German troops and approximately 14,000 fighters of the 19th Waffen-SS Division held the “Courland Fortress”, where as late as March 1945, an independent Republic of Latvia had been proclaimed under German occupation. Before Latvia became Soviet again and disappeared behind the Iron Curtain, many Latvians fled to the West, including to Germany. The remaining Baltic Germans also mostly fled or were expelled in 1944/45. In October 2012, a monument was unveiled in Bauska to commemorate the Latvian troops who defended the town against the Red Army during World War II. Pro-government circles supported the monument's erection, while the opposition in Latvia criticized it, arguing that the Latvian troops had fought "for Adolf Hitler" rather than for Latvian independence.Gederts Gelsis:

==== 1945–1991: Latvia under Soviet occupation ====
Between 1945 and 1991, the "Latvian SSR" was de facto a constituent republic of the Soviet Union. From the Soviet perspective, it had already become one in 1940 and remained so from 1941 to 1945. From the perspective of modern-day Latvia, however, the Latvian SSR never existed de jure, as it was established through an annexation of Latvia that violated international law. In the agreements on the post-war order (the Tehran and Yalta Conferences of 1943 and 1945) and during the founding of the UN, the Western Allies did not openly challenge Latvia's membership in the Soviet Union at the time. However, many Western countries maintained the policy of non-recognition of the Soviet annexation. On January 13, 1983, the European Parliament passed a resolution condemning the Soviet occupation of the Baltic states. This declaration was also made on behalf of the Federal Republic of Germany.

The state organs of the German Democratic Republic (GDR), on the other hand, always shared the Soviet legal view that Latvia had been part of the Soviet Union since 1940.

=== Since 1991: Following the renewal of Latvia's independence ===
In 1990, the German federal government did not initially provide active support for the restoration of Latvia as a sovereign state, as it did not want to jeopardize the process of German reunification by undermining Mikhail Gorbachev's Perestroika policies. However, only a few days after the recognition of the Baltic states by Russian President Boris Yeltsin, Germany established diplomatic relations with Latvia in 1991. Germany acknowledged a special historical responsibility to support the Baltic states as reparations for the injustices resulting from the Molotov–Ribbentrop Pact and the occupation of Latvia by Nazi Germany. Subsequently, the federal government promoted Latvia's integration into Western democratic structures. For a long time, the majority of German foreign policymakers were reluctant to support a policy of strict containment of Russia by NATO states—a course long demanded by many Latvian politicians—arguing that such a policy would excessively strain German–Russian relations. Nevertheless, Germany supported the decision made by NATO on April 1, 2014, to suspend cooperation with Russia within the NATO–Russia Council.

In 2011, Udo Bongartz summarized the historically rooted conflict between Latvians and the West (including the Federal Republic of Germany since 1949) with the following words: "The West betrayed the Balts and other Eastern Europeans. The latter do not accept co-responsibility for the Holocaust. This is the historical conflict that divides Europe today."

Despite these differences, German visitors to Latvia today notice little tension: the image of Germany among the Latvian population is largely neutral to friendly. Noticeable resentment toward German tourists has not found a lasting foothold in Latvian public sentiment.

== Diplomatic missions ==
- Germany has an embassy in Riga.
- Latvia has an embassy in Berlin and honorary consulates in Bremen, Düsseldorf, Frankfurt, Hamburg, Künzelsau, Munich, and Rostock.
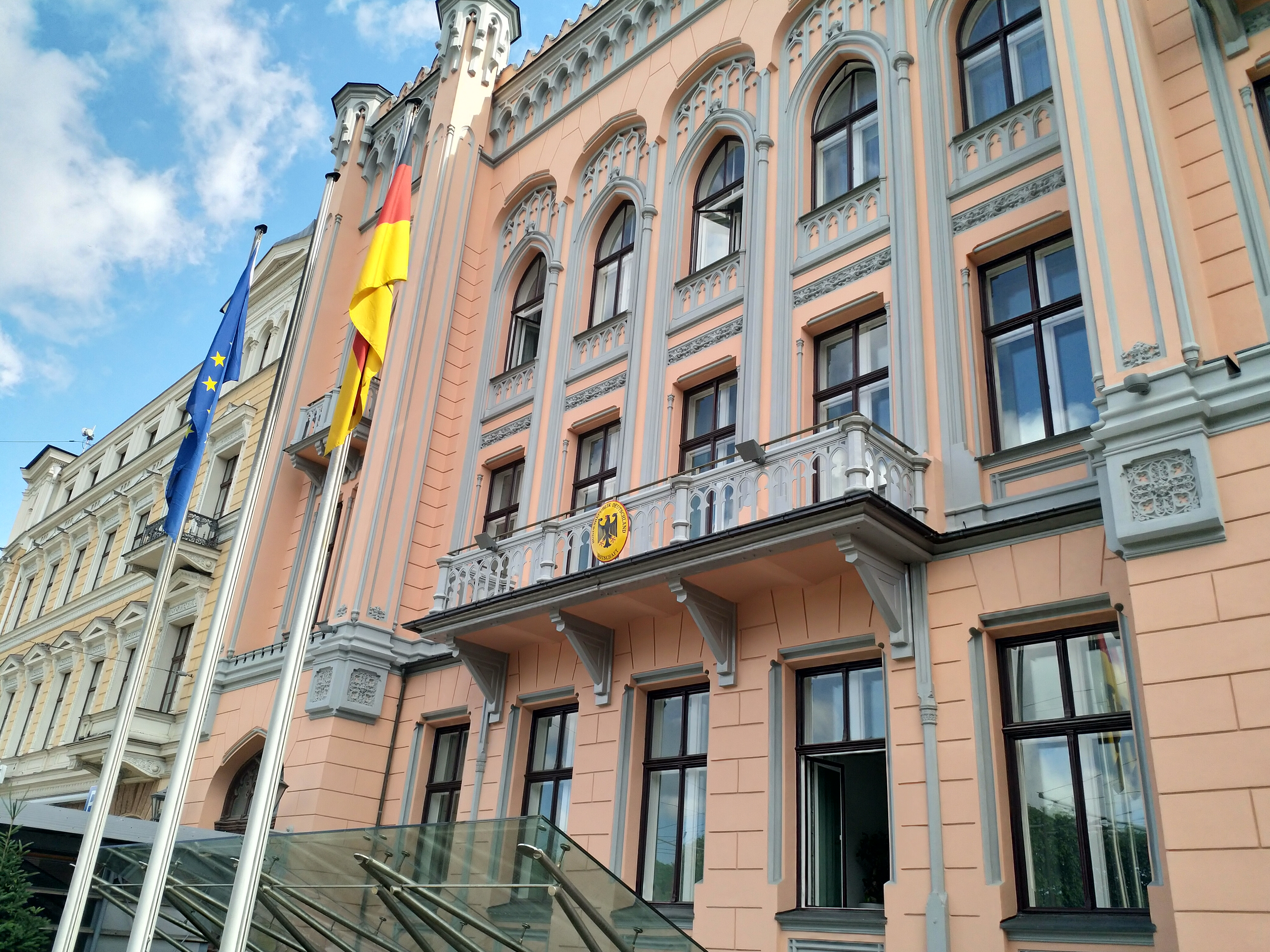
Embassy of Germany in Riga

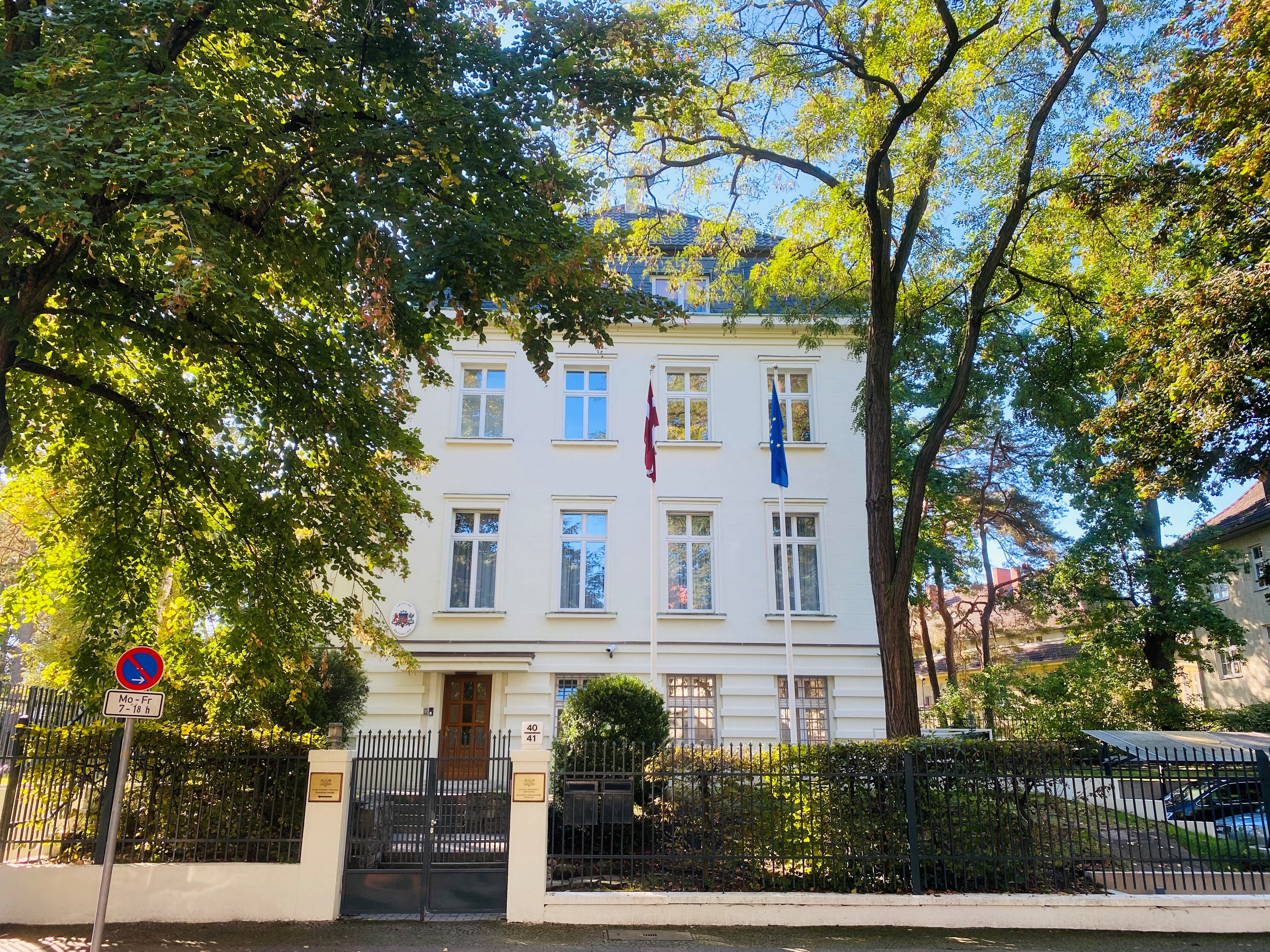
Embassy of Latvia in Berlin

== See also ==
- Foreign relations of Germany
- Foreign relations of Latvia
