= Bielenstein =

Bielenstein is a surname. Notable people with the surname include:

- Bernhard Bielenstein (1877–1959), Baltic German architect
- Hans Bielenstein (1920–2015), Swedish sinologist and professor
