= Dobeles dzirnavnieks =

Latvian grain-processing and food-production company

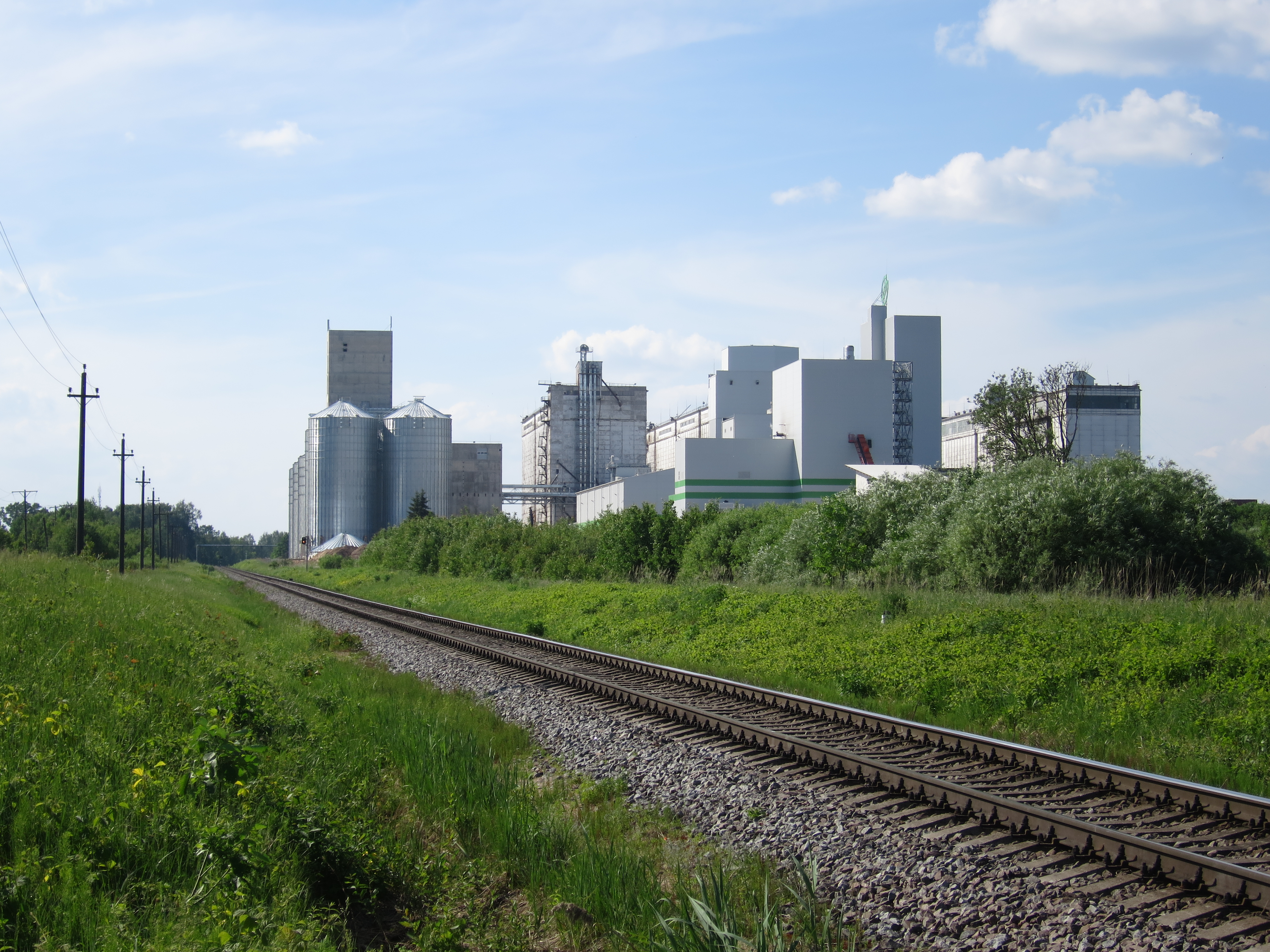
- Production complex in Dobele, viewed from the railway side in 2018
- Native name: AS "Dobeles dzirnavnieks"
- Type: Joint-stock company
- Industry: Food processing, grain processing
- Predecessor: Jelgava grain combine
- Founded: 1976
- Headquarters: Spodrības iela 4, Dobele, Latvia
- Products: Flour, semolina, flour mixtures, pasta, cereal flakes, groats, animal feed
- Revenue: €238.277 million (2024)
- Net income: €12.365 million (2024)
- Owner: Tartu Mill AS (94.63%)
- Website: dzirnavnieks.lv

Dobeles dzirnavnieks (legal name AS "Dobeles dzirnavnieks") is a Latvian grain-processing and food-production company based in Dobele, Latvia. Its industrial origin is traced to a grain-processing operation established in 1976, and the present joint-stock company was registered in Latvia on 18 January 1991. The company produces wheat flour, semolina, flour mixtures, pasta, cereal flakes, groats and animal feed.

The company is part of the Estonian milling group Tartu Mill. Lursoft data show Tartu Mill AS as the largest shareholder of AS "Dobeles dzirnavnieks", with 94.63 percent of the shares registered in 2026. In 2024, Dobeles dzirnavnieks had turnover of €238.277 million and profit of €12.365 million; its plants processed 341,000 tonnes of grain that year.

== History ==
The company traces its production history to 1976, when grain-processing operations began as the Jelgava grain combine. The current legal entity was registered as a Latvian joint-stock company in January 1991. By the 2010s, Dobeles dzirnavnieks had become one of Latvia's larger food-processing companies. In 2018 it ranked first among Latvian food and beverage companies by turnover in the Latvian Business Annual Report compiled by Firmas.lv and LETA, with turnover of €117.35 million.

Tartu Mill became the company's owner in 2008. Lursoft shareholder data later recorded Tartu Mill as the controlling shareholder, while the remaining shares were held by natural persons. EMIS lists Dobeles Eko SIA and Rīgas Dzirnavnieks AS among the company's subsidiaries.

Dobeles dzirnavnieks expanded its pasta business in the 2010s. It opened a spaghetti production plant in 2013 after having opened a pasta production plant the previous year. In 2016, a new cereal plant was launched; the project was described as enabling an increase in grain processing by about 10 percent to 220,000 tonnes per year.

== Operations ==
Dobeles dzirnavnieks stores and processes grain and produces flour, semolina, flour mixtures, pasta, cereal flakes, groats, pearl barley and animal feed. The company's production complex is located in Dobele, where it operates grain-processing and food-production facilities.

The company's products are sold domestically and exported. The European Commission's EU trade profile states that Dobeles dzirnavnieks exports its products to more than 70 countries in Europe, Africa, Asia and South America. Public Broadcasting of Latvia reported in 2021 that the company's pasta products were distributed domestically and exported to Europe, Asia, South America and Africa.

== Expansion and investment ==
In 2019, the company planned investment projects exceeding €30 million. The Baltic Times reported that the investment programme included expanding organic grain processing to more than 40,000 tonnes and developing a pasta production line, with EU co-financing from the European Agricultural Fund for Rural Development and the European Regional Development Fund.

Two new plants were launched in Dobele in July 2021. One plant was intended for organic cereal production and the other for pasta production. The total investment was reported at €35 million: €22.7 million for biological grain production infrastructure and €12.4 million for the pasta production plant. The pasta plant was designed for annual production capacity of about 40,000 tonnes, while the biological grain infrastructure was associated with cereal production capacity of about 50,000 tonnes per year.

The EU CAP Network described the company's organic grain project as a full-cycle organic grain processing project involving new facilities, new silos and a dedicated organic cereal flakes plant. The project had a total budget of €22.694 million, with EAFRD, national or regional, and private financing. The same profile states that organic grain processed by Dobeles dzirnavnieks had exceeded 40,000 tonnes and was projected to reach about 65,000 tonnes in 2024.

The company continued capital expenditure in 2024. Its management report, cited by Lauku Bizness, recorded €10.3 million in investments during the year, including the third stage of a grain-storage tower system and the introduction of industrial robots to automate packaging processes.

== Baltic Mill and group transactions ==
In March 2021, Dobeles dzirnavnieks signed an agreement to acquire 100 percent of the Lithuanian grain-processing company AB Baltic Mill, subject to competition approval in the Baltic states. The proposed transaction included Baltic Mill group companies such as UAB Malsena Plius, Amber Pasta, Rīgas Dzirnavnieks and Balti Veski.

The Estonian Competition Authority's 2022 annual report records that A/S Dobeles Dzirnavnieks submitted a notice of concentration to acquire control over AB Baltic Mill and that the authority granted permission in May 2022 subject to obligations. The authority assessed the concentration mainly at the production and wholesale level, where both groups produced types of flour sold to bakeries, confectioners, wholesalers and retailers.

In 2024, German cereal-processing company H. & J. Brüggen KG entered into a transaction concerning Rīgas Dzirnavnieks. Through a subsidiary, Brüggen became a 50 percent shareholder in Rīgas Dzirnavnieks, while Dobeles dzirnavnieks continued to own flour and flour-product production and the Herkuless and Saimniece brands. The transaction focused on oat processing, with Rīgas Dzirnavnieks specialising in oat grain pre-processing and processing.

== Recent financials ==
Dobeles dzirnavnieks increased turnover from €117.35 million in 2018 to €129.638 million in 2019. In 2019 the company processed 285,000 tonnes of grain, and export sales accounted for 60 percent of turnover.

In 2023, Dobeles dzirnavnieks had turnover of €237.505 million and profit of €12.172 million. In 2024, turnover was €238.277 million and profit was €12.365 million. The company's plants processed 341,000 tonnes of grain in 2024, 78,000 tonnes more than in the previous year.
