= Oskars Bārs =

Latvian architect

- Born: Oskars Aleksandrs Johans Bārs; 17 October 1848; Dobele, Russian Empire
- Died: 9 January 1914 (aged 65); Riga, Russian Empire
- Known for: architecture
- Movement: Eclecticism, Art Nouveau

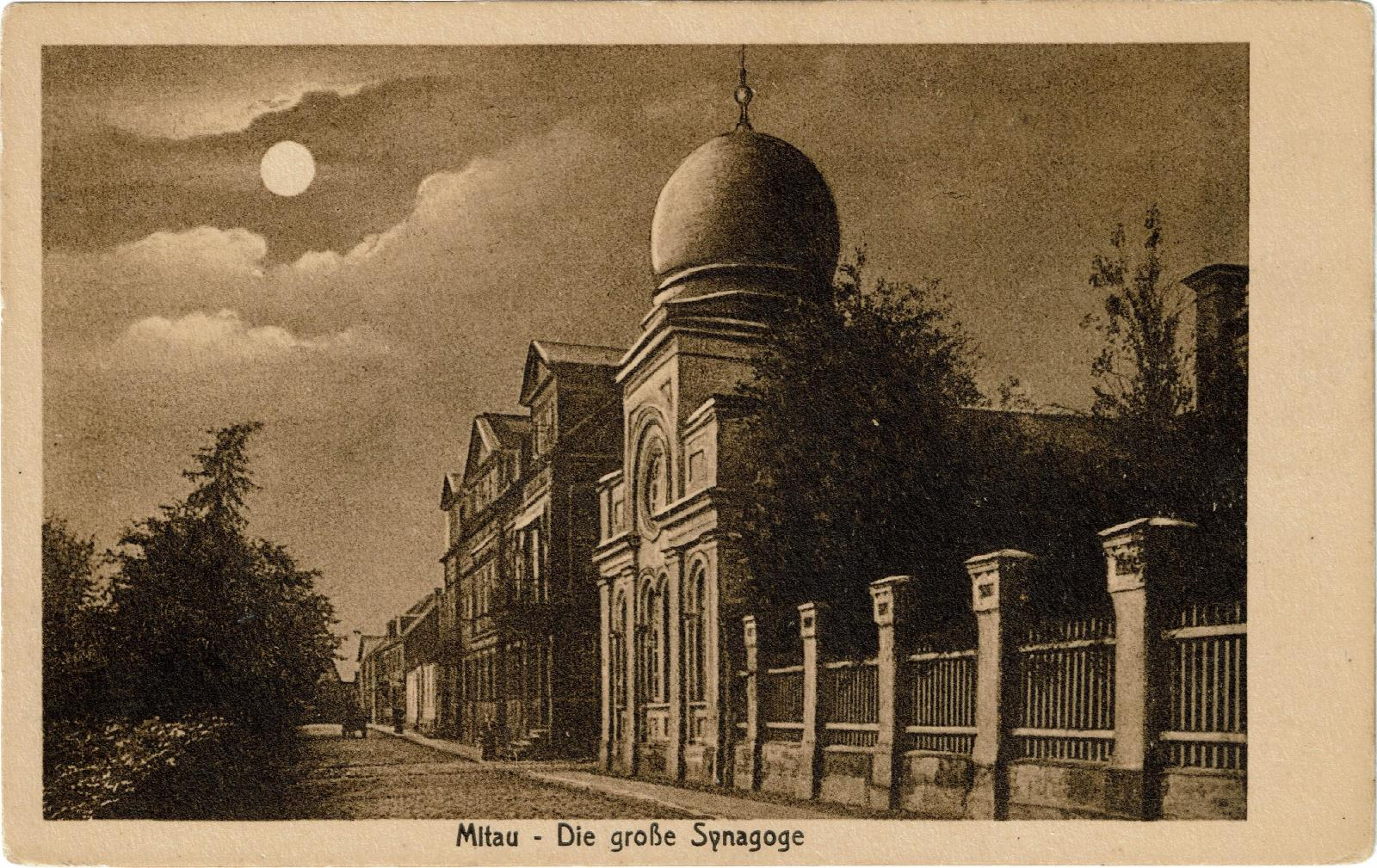
Jelgava Synagogue

Oskars Aleksandrs Johans Bārs (17 October 1848, in Dobele – 9 January 1914, in Riga) was a Latvian architect. He is most noted for his work in Jelgava. From 1875 to 1879 he designed and constructed the Jelgavas Synagogue in the city.
