= August Bielenstein =

Baltic-German theologian

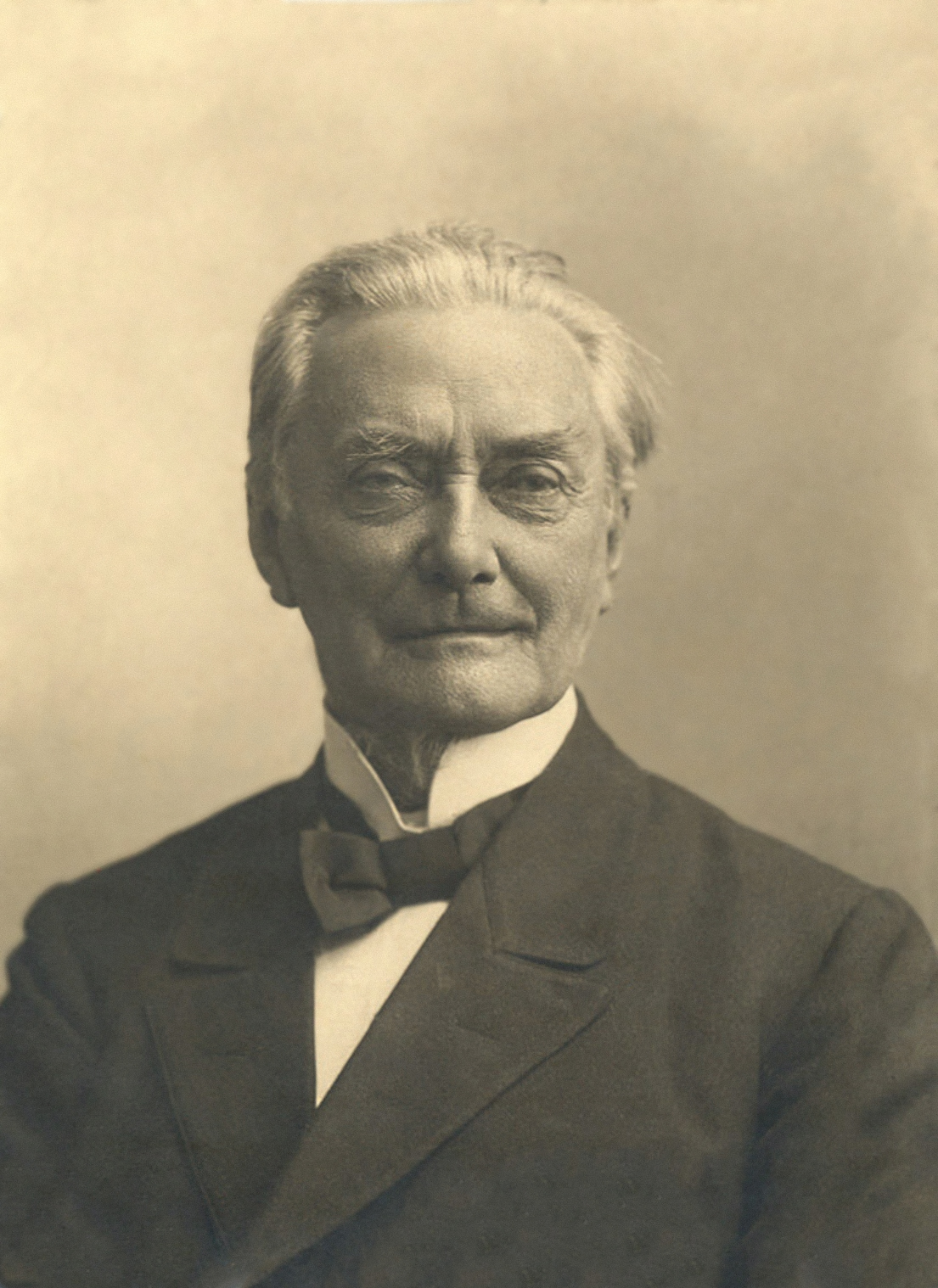
- Born: August Johann Gottfried Bielenstein; 4 March [O.S. 20 February] 1826; Mitau, Courland Governorate, Russian Empire (now Jelgava, Latvia)
- Died: 6 July [O.S. 23 June] 1907; Mitau, Courland Governorate, Russian Empire (now Jelgava, Latvia)
- Occupations: Pastor linguist ethnographer
- Spouse: Ernestine Louise Hermine Erna von Bordelius

August Johann Gottfried Bielenstein (Latvian: Augusts Johans Gotfrīds Bīlenšteins; 4 March [O.S. 20 February] 1826 – 6 July [O.S. 23 June] 1907) was a Baltic German linguist, folklorist, ethnographer, and theologian.

Bielenstein was born in Mitau (Jelgava), where he also died. His father was a Lutheran curate and teacher named Johann Gottfried Bielenstein. He spent his childhood in Jaunauce parish. Later he traveled to Germany and studied in gymnasium in Saxony. He studied at the University of Halle (in Prussian Saxony) like numerous prominent pastors in the Baltic region, and received a doctorate in theology from the Imperial University of Dorpat in 1850. He was granted an honorary doctorate from the University of Königsberg in 1883. After his father's death Bielenstein took over his duties as a pastor in Jaunauce parish.

In 1867, he became pastor in Dobele where he lived and worked until 1905. He supervised the revised edition of the Bible in Latvian in 1877. During the Russian Revolution of 1905 local revolutionists led by Dāvids Beika stormed his residence at Dobele German pastorat and burned his library and archive. After that Bielenstein resigned from his post and left Dobele. He lived his last years in his native Mitau (Jelgava).

As editor of the major Latvian language newspaper Latviešu Avīzes and a member of the St. Petersburg Academy of Sciences, Bielenstein was the author of numerous major works on linguistics and ethnography, including Die lettische Sprache, nach ihren Lauten und Formen (The Latvian Language, Its Phonetics and Forms, 2 volumes, 1863–64) and Die Grenzen des lettischen Volksstammes und der lettischen Sprache in der Gegenwart und im 13. Jahrhundert (The Borders of the Latvian Tribes and the Latvian Language in the Present and in the 13th Century, 1892). He encouraged the collection of dainas, studied traditional wooden architecture, and examined castle mounds to identify them according to their description in ancient chronicles.

While he made many contributions to the study of the Latvian language and culture, he was also a fierce opponent of the Young Latvians and a staunch defender of the Baltic German tradition. His friendship with Wilhelm Mannhardt led to an interest in Latvian mythology and folk psychology. From 1864 until 1895, he was a president and later honorary president of Latvian Literary Society. In 1893, he became honorary member of Riga Latvian society.

== Family ==
Bielenstein married Ernestine Louise Hermine Van Bordelius and they had nine children, six of which survived to adulthood. Two of his children became pastors. One of his sons was architect Bernhard Bielenstein. His daughter was Martha Beilenstein who created the Atlas of the Ethnological Geography of Modern and Prehistoric Latvia (Atlas der ethnologischen Geographie des heutigen und des praehistorischen Lettenlandes).

== Publications ==
Beilenstien’s publications included;

- Handbuch der lettischen Sprache (F. Lucas, 1863)
- Die lettische Sprache nach ihren Lauten und Formen (F. Dümmler, 1863), with A. W. Schade, Ferdinand Dümmler, and Wilhelm Scherer
- Die Elemente der lettischen Sprache (J.F. Steffenhagen und sohn, 1866)
- Fragmente aus der Ethnographie und Geographie Alt-Livlands (Gedruckt bei J.F. Steffenhagen und Sohn, 1884)
- Undeudsche Psalmen (Behre, 1886) with Adalbert Bezzenberger
- Die Grenzen des lettischen Volksstammes und der lettischen Sprache in der Gegenwart und im 13. Jahrhundert: ein Beitrag zur ethnologischen Geographie und Geschichte Russlands (Commissionäre der Kaiserlichen Akademie der Wissenschaften, 1892)
- Welchen wert Hat für uns die deutsche Muttersprache? Gedanken über das Danken. Zwei Vorträge aus dem Gebiete der Volkspsychologie (Jonck & Poliewsky, 1907)
- Die Holzbauten und Holzgeräte der Letten ([n.p., 1907)
- Lettisches wörterbuch ... (H. Brutzer & co., 1972) with Carl Christian Ulmann, Georg Neiken, and Gustav S. Brasche
- Ein glückliches Leben: Selbstbiographie
- Lettische Grammatik

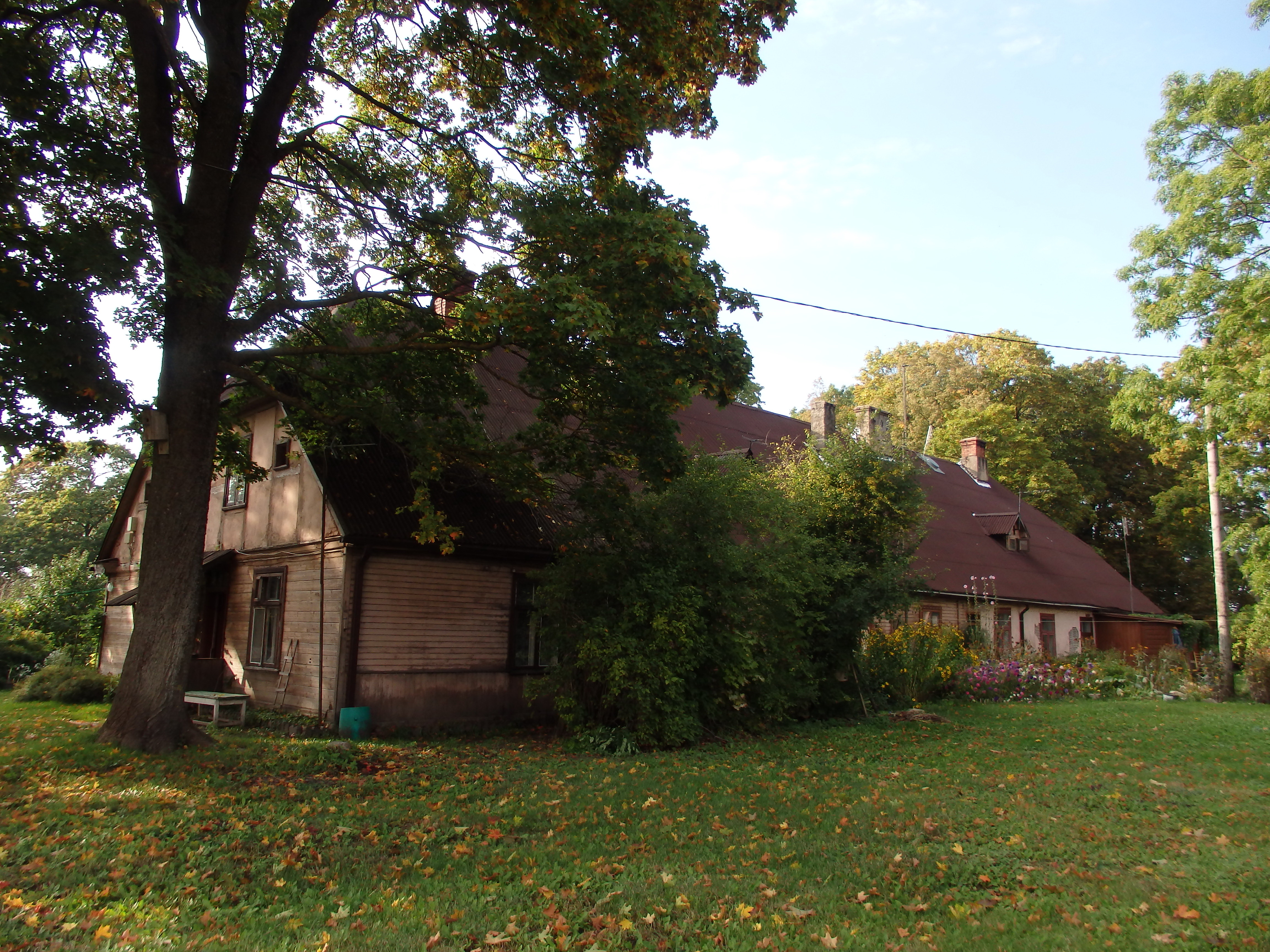
Building of former Dobele German pastorat where Bielenstein lived from 1867 until 1905.

== See also ==
- Latvian Literary Society
- List of Baltic German scientists
