= Tartu Mill =

Estonian milling company

- Type: Private
- Industry: food industry
- Founded: Tartu, Estonia (incorporated 2000)
- Headquarters: Tartu, Estonia
- Area served: Baltic states
- Key people: Uuno Lausing Managing Director
- Products: wheat and rye flour, pasta, feeds for animals, etc.
- Revenue: € 56.7 million (2013)
- Net income: € 5 million (2013)
- Number of employees: 53 (2013)
- Website: tartumill.ee

Tartu Mill AS (prior to 2010 Tartu Veski AS) is a milling company in Estonia and the largest milling company in the Baltic States.

The company marks its founding back to 1885, when the first big grain mill in Tartu was erected.

Tartu Mill stores, processes, purifies, and dries grains. Among its products there are wheat and rye flour, semolina, pasta, mixture for baking bread, dry mixtures, and various types of feed ingredients.

Since 2008 the company owns the majority shares of the AS Dobeles dzirnavnieks flour mill in Dobele, Latvia, which in turn is the owner of the AS Rīgas dzirnavnieks mill in Riga, Latvia and the flour processing company Balti Veski AS in Tallinn, Estonia since 2022.

In October 2024, the German miller H. & J. Brüggen KG acquired a 50% stake in Rīgas dzirnavnieks, forming a German–Latvian joint venture focused on oat exports. Beyond the Baltic states, Tartu Mill exports flour and grain products to markets including Egypt and Venezuela.

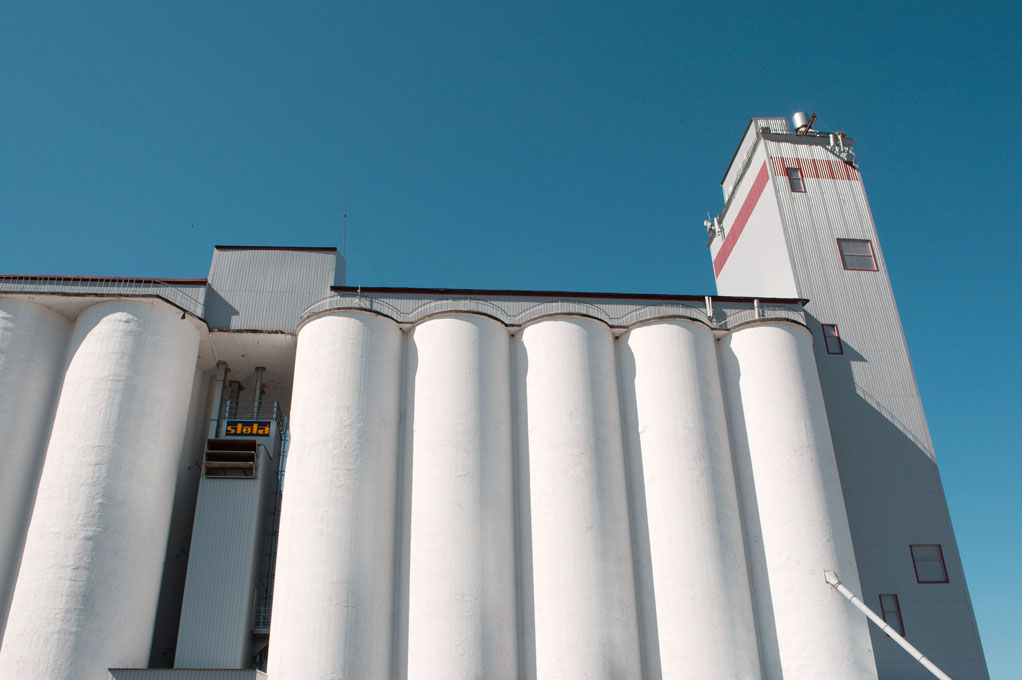
Tartu elevator was set up in 1940s

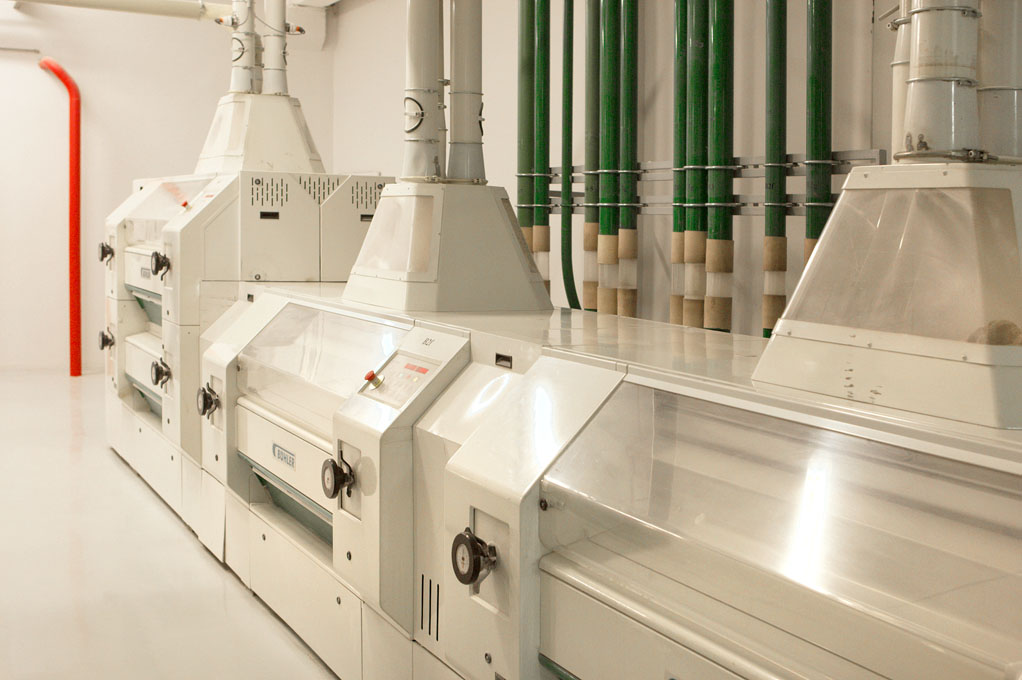
Interior of Tartu elevator

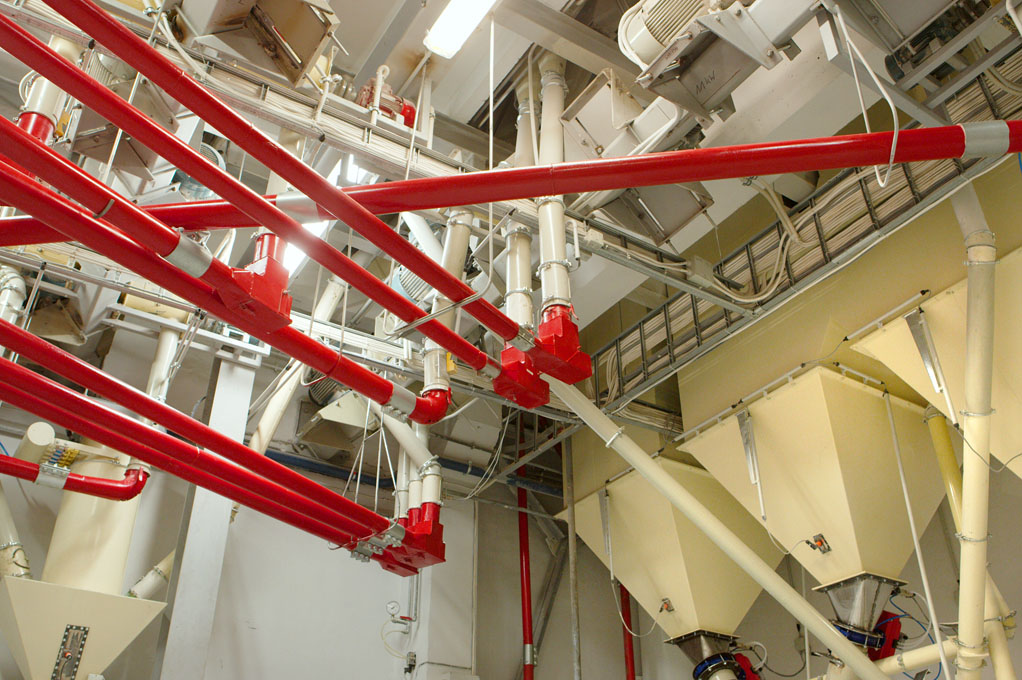
Interior of Tartu elevator

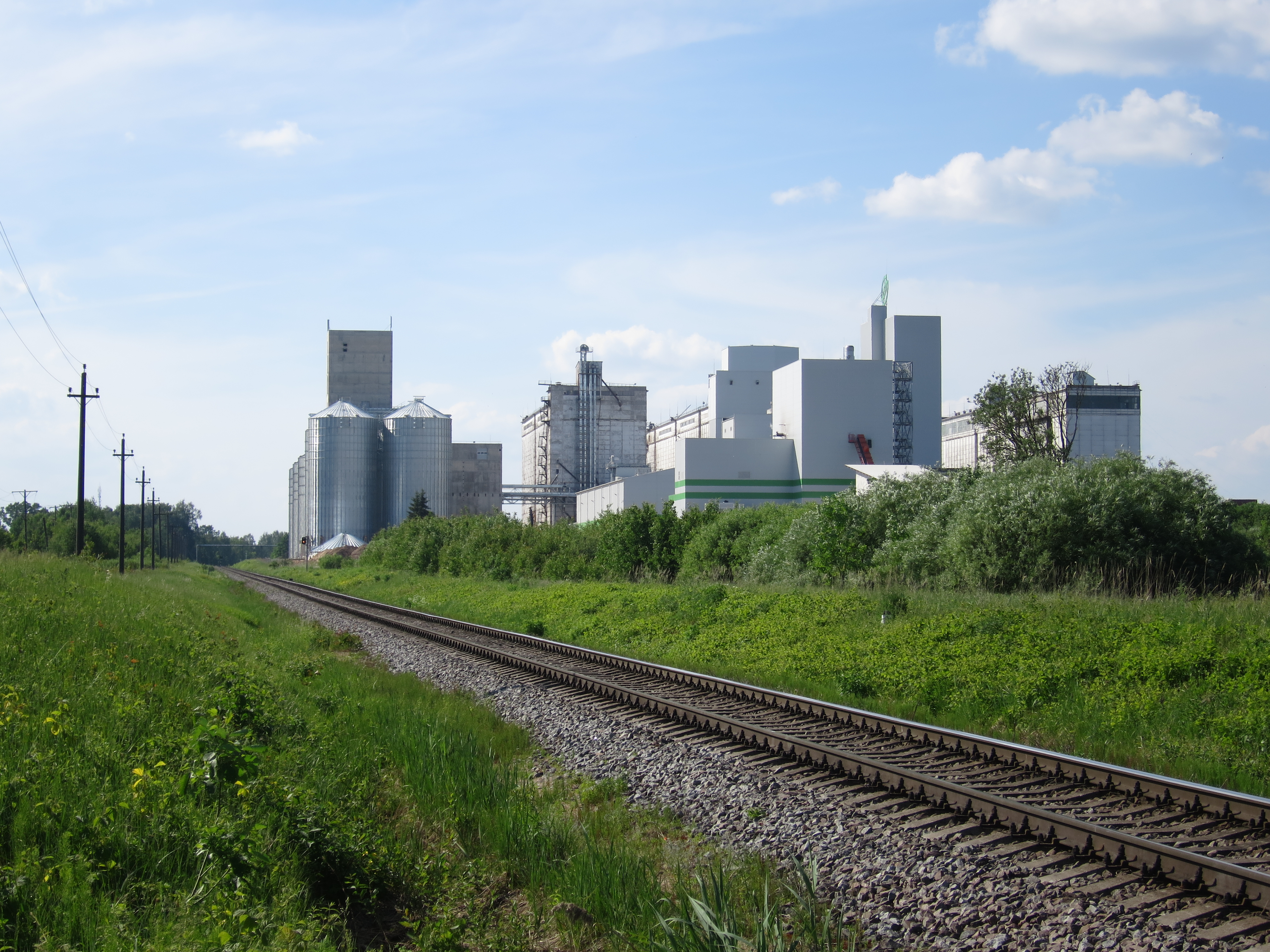
AS Dobeles dzirnavnieks (Dobele Mill)
