= Latvian Literary Society =

The Latvian Literary Society (German: Lettisch-literärische Gesellschaft, Latvian: Latviešu literārā biedrība), also called The Society of Latvian Friends (Latviešu draugu biedrība) was founded in 1824 by Baltic Germans, mainly pastors. The goal of the Society was to investigate the Latvian language, folklore and culture. At the time, when the Society was organized, hardly any Latvian educated in a higher education existed, and nobody researched their language or folklore.

The society published a periodical which looked at scholarly studies and ethnographical research.

The organization was dissolved in 1941 by Soviet authorities after the occupation of Latvia.

== Presidents ==
- 1824-1838: Gustav Reinhold von Kloth
- 1838-1845: Jacob Florentin Lundberg
- 1845-1851: Johann Theodor Berent
- 1851-1854: Karl Friedrich Jacob Hugenberger
- 1854-1864: Rudolf Schulz
- 1864-1895: August Johann Gottfried Bielenstein
- 1895-1903: Johannes Sakranowicz
- 1903-1919: Theodor Döbner
- 1925-1940: Jānis Zēvers

== Members of Society in 1901 ==
=== Honorary members ===
1. Bielenstein August Pastor zu Doblen, Ehrenpresident
2. Auning Robert Pastor zu Seßwegen
3. Baron Christian Oberlehrer emer. zu Riga, Suworowstr. 7
4. Bezzenberger Adalbert Dr., Professor in Königsberg
5. Döbner Theodor Pastor zu Kalzenau
6. Hausmann R. Professor emer. in Jurjew (Dorpat)
7. Heerwagen Ludwig Pastor emer. in Riga, Nicolaistr. 41 gest. 17 September 1899
8. Heyking v. Alfons Kurl. Landesbevollmächtigter a.D. gest. 22 March 1900
9. Hollman Friedrich Livl. General-Superintendent, gest. 1 Septepber 1900
10. Keyserling Hugo Graf; Kurl. Landesbevollmächtigter
11. Meyendorf v. Friedrich Landmarschall in Riga
12. Panck Otto Kurl. General-Superintendent
13. Recke v.d. Carl Gutsbesitzer zu Waldeck bei Mitau
14. Uwarowa Praskowja Gräfin; Präsidentin der Mosk. archäol. Gesellschaft

=== Ordinary Members and Corresponding Members ===
1. Allunan Peter Privatier in Mitau, Seestr. 15
2. Apsing Peter Stationsvorsteher in Segewold
3. Aron M. Journalist in Riga, Sprenkstr. 2. Q. 43
4. Augstkalns Verwalter, Smolensk
5. Awoht Karl Pastor zu Laudohn
6. Bahder v. Wilh. Aug. Pastor zu Neu-Autz
7. Bankin Martin Pastor zu Ust-Dwinsk
8. Bährent Paul Pastor zu Arrasch
9. Becker Th. Pastor zu Frauenburg
10. Behrsin Peter Buchhändler in Riga
11. Behrsin Ludw. Cand. Oberlehrer in Kiew
12. Behrsin Robert Lehrer in Siuxt-Pönau
13. Behting Johann Musiklehrer in Irmlau
14. Berg Theodor Lehrer in Bickern
15. Berg Arwid Advokat in St. Petersburg
16. Bergmann Rudolf Pastor in Riga
17. Bernewitz Ernst Oberpastor in Riga
18. Bernewitz Alexander Pastor zu Kandau
19. Bernewitz Alexander Pastor zu Neuenburg
20. Bernewitz Fr. Pastor zu Wallhof
21. Bernhard J. Th. A. Pastor, CM
22. Besthorn Ferdinand Buchhändler in Mitau
23. Beuningen Friedrich Pastor zu Schrunden
24. Bidder O. Pastor zu Siekeln
25. Bielenstein Emil Pastor zu Sahten
26. Bielenstein Johannes Pastor zu Ringen
27. Bielenstein Walter Pastor zu Mesothen
28. Bisseneek J. Agronom in Mitau
29. Block Richard Küster in Sonnaxt
30. Brasde J. Agronom in Paulsgnade
31. Brasche Heinrich Pastor zu Niederbartau
32. Braunschweig Hermann Pastor zu Segewold
33. Buchholz Anton Privatier in Riga, gest. 3 October 1901
34. Buddenbrock v. August Gutsb. in Kudling, bei Wenden
35. Busch Julius Pastor zu Nerft
36. Busch Woldemar Pastor zu Bauske
37. Butuls Ad. Dr. Riga. Kalkstraße 13
38. Conradi Moritz Pastor in Mitau
39. Czarnay Hugo Pastor zu Blieden
40. Damberg David Lehrer in Smilten
41. Diederichs Victor Lehrer, Alt-Rahden per Bauske
42. Diston Alexander Pastor emer. in Mitau
43. Duisburg Arthur Pastor zu Birsen
44. Ehrmann Joh. Pastor zu Lasdohn
45. Endzelin J. Oberlehrer in Jurjew (Dorpat)
46. Erdmann Oswald Pastor zu Bersohn
47. Fedder Georg Pastor zu Wenden
48. Feldmann Karl Pastor zu Setzen
49. Feyerabend Carl Pastor zu Dubena
50. Freiberg Ernst Pastor zu Ugahlen
51. Freimann C. Agronom in Mitau
52. Funck v. Theodor Gutsbesitzer zu Kaiwen. Gest. 8 August 1900
53. Gähtgens v. Theophil Propst in Riga
54. Gavel v. Hermann Pastor zu Neuhausen
55. Girgensohn Leonhard Pastor zu Lemsal
56. Gläser Karl Pastor zu Stenden
57. Graudiņ R. Redacteur in Mitau
58. Grave Friedrich Pastor zu Salisburg
59. Grimm Wilh. Pastor zu Rottelsdorf, Prowinz Sachsen, CM
60. Groß Ernst Pastor zu Katlakaln
61. Große Julius Pastor adj. zu Alt-Rahden
62. Grüner Carl Pastor zu Roennen, Propst
63. Grüner Hermann Pastor zu Salgaln
64. Grüner Eduard Pastor zu Appricken
65. Grünfeld Johann Lehrer in Neuenburg
66. Guleke Rudolf Propst zu Alt-Pebalg, gest. 25 January 1901
67. Häcker Wilhelm Buchdruckereibesitzer in Riga
68. Haffner Paul Pastor zu Lemburg
69. Heintze Paul Pastor zu Dalbingen
70. Hertel Johann Dr. Mag. pharm., Apotheker in Mitau
71. Hilde Reinhold Pastor zu Struschan-Stirnian
72. Hillner Gotthilf Pastor zu Kokenhusen
73. Hoerschelmann Leo Buchhändler in Riga
74. Hugenberger Wilhelm Pastor zu Angermünde, gest. 10 December 1899
75. Jeske Adolf Pastor zu Schaulen
76. Josephi Herm. Pastor in Riga
77. Irbe Karl Pastor zu Serben
78. Kade Alexander Cand. in Rodenpois
79. Kaehlbrandt Johann Pastor zu Riga
80. Kaehlbrandt Emil Oberpastor zu Riga, Propst emer.
81. Kahlen v. Heinrich Dr. phil. zu Geistershof
82. Kaptein Ernst Buchhändler in Riga
83. Katterfeld Ludwig Pastor in Mitau
84. Katterfeld Adolf Dr. med., Arzt in Waldheim
85. Kaudsit Matthies Lehrer in Alt-Pebalg
86. Keller Wilhelm Oberpastor in Riga
87. Keller R. Pastor in Riga
88. Keußler Gottlieb Pastor in St. Petersburg
89. Klapmeyer Heinrich Pastor zu Lesten
90. Klausting Christoph Organist in Grenzhof
91. Klawiņ R. Hauslehrer u. Landswirth in Kokenhusen
92. Krause Richard Pastor zu Wonsees bei Kulmbach (Baiern) CM
93. Kröger Arthur Pastor zu Saucken
94. Krüger Carl Pastor zu Sessau
95. Krüger Eduard Dr. med. in Mitau
96. Krüger Leopold L.J. Pastor zu Wolmar
97. Külpe Ernst Pastor zu Libau
98. Kundsiņ Carl Pastor zu Smilten
99. Lamberg Theodor Pastor in Birsgal
100. Landsberg G. Buchdrucker in Mitau
101. Lautenbach Jacob Mag., Privatdozent der vergl. Sprachkunde in Jurjew
102. Leepiņ Lehrer in Neu-Autz
103. Letz Friedrich Pastor zu Subbath
104. Lieven Paul Dr. med. in Behnen
105. Lieventhal August Prof. in Riga. Gest. 18 May 1900
106. Löwenthal v. Friedrich Redacteur an der "Post" in Berlin. CM
107. Lohmeyer Dr. Prof in Königsberg i. P. CM
108. Lotto Eugen Pfarrer zu Schwarzort (Ost-Preussen)
109. Marnitz Xaver Pastor zu Uexküll
110. Maswersit J. Agronom in Saratow
111. Mekon F. Literat in Sassenhof. Gest 3 June 1901
112. Meyren Johann Pastor in Riga
113. Mierzynski Anton Dr. Professor in Warschau. CM
114. Moltrecht Carl Pastor emer. zu St. Mathiae
115. Moltrecht Emil Pastor in Talsen, Gest. 29 December 1898
116. Mühlenbach K. Oberlehrer in Riga
117. Mühlenbach Friedrich Oberlehrer in Mitau
118. Mühlendorff Wilhelm Pastor zu Muischazeem
119. Müller K. Schulvorsteher in Wenden
120. Neander Paul Pastor zu Mitau
121. Nehlep Johannes Oberlehrer in Mitau
122. Neuland Johann Pastor zu Wolmar
123. Ohse Jakob Professor in Jurjew (Dorpat)
124. Otto Gustav Dr. med., Kreisarzt in Mitau
125. Pahrstrauts J. Pastor zu Gnadenfeld Gouvernement Saratow
126. Peitan Woldemar Pastor zu Würzau
127. Pelling Paul Pastor zu Barbern
128. Pelz David Gymnasialehrer in St. Petersburg
129. Plates Arnold Dr. phil. Buchdruckereibesitzer in Riga
130. Plutte W. Pastor adj. in Riga
131. Pohrt Eduard Pastor zu Rodenpois, Schulrath
132. Pohrt Gottlieb Pastor in Uetersen bei Hamburg. CM
133. Radecki v. Ottokar Riga
134. Reinberg Gustav Pastor zu St. Gertrud in Riga
135. Reinberg Adolf Buchdrucker in Riga
136. Reinhard Johann Pastor zu Mitau
137. Remmeck M. Gymnasialinspektor in St. Petersburg
138. Robs Hans Kameralhofsbeamter in Mitau
139. Ropp v.d. Max Gutsbesitzer zu Bixten, Kreismarschall
140. Rosen G. Pastor adj. zu St. Petersburg
141. Rosenberger Robert Pastor zu Salwen
142. Rottermund K.N. Pastor in Riga
143. Ruhdul Joh. Kameralhofsbeamter in Mitau
144. Rutkowski Arnold Pastor zu Hofzumberge
145. Sadowsky Gustav Pastor zu Angern
146. Sakranowicz Johannes Pastor zu Groß-Autz
147. Sanders Johann Pastor in St. Petersburg
148. Savary Eberhard Pastor zu Ascheraden
149. Schack-Steffenhagen H. Buchdruckereibesitzer in Mitau
150. Schalme Jeannot Pastor zu Pilten
151. Scheuermann Eugen Pastor an der Lutherkirche zu Riga
152. Schilling Karl Pastor zu Nitau
153. Schippang Diakonus in Riga
154. Schlau Carl Dr. Pastor zu Salis, Propst
155. Schmidt-Wartenberg v. Prof. in Chicago. CM
156. Schröder Ernst Pastor emer. Riga. Kirchenstr. 3.
157. Schröder Robert Pastor zu Sissegal
158. Schröder v. Leopold Dr., Professor in Innsbruck. CM
159. Schulz Rudolf Propst zu Eckau
160. Schulz Hermann Pastor zu Zeymel
161. Schwanberg Carl in Mitau
162. Schwartz Walter Pastor zu Allasch
163. Seeberg Georg Pastor zu Doblen
164. Seewald Peter Lehrer in Mitau
165. Seesemann Gustaw Pastor zu Grünhof
166. Seesemann Heinrich Propst in Grenzhof
167. Seesemann Leonhard Pastor zu Kursiten
168. Seiler Herm. Pastor zu Wormen
169. Seiler Wilhelm Pastor zu Zohden
170. Semmer E. Professor in St. Petersburg
171. Siegmund Karl Hausvater in Riga
172. Sielmann Theodor Oberlehrer, Landw. zu Welkenhof
173. Sihle Heinrich Agronom, Karlowa bei Dorpat
174. Sihwert Fr. Lehrer in Tels-Paddern
175. Silin Peter Lehrer in Riga
176. Skribanowitz Karl Pastor zu Cremon
177. Skrusit M Journalist in Riga
178. Spalwing Heinrich Redakteur in Riga
179. Spalwing August Pastor zu Lodiger
180. Spriede J. Gutsbesitzer, Groß-Bercken
181. Steinfeld Edmund Pastor zu Samiten
182. Steinfeld Wladimir Dr. med. in Alt-Autz
183. Stender Hans Pastor zu Sonnaxt
184. Stieda Ludwig Dr. Professor zu Königsberg in Pr. CM
185. Straume J. Journalist in Mitau
186. Strautmann Chr. Pastor in Bauske
187. Strautsel Paul Dr. med., Mitau
188. Thielemann Constantin Pastor adj. in Doblen
189. Tittelbach Werner Pastor zu Grösen
190. Treu Paul Pastor in Riga
191. Tschakste J. Rechtsanwalt in Mitau
192. Ucke Arnold Dr. auf Stirnen
193. Vierhuff Gotthard Pastor in Wenden
194. Vogel Richard Propst emer. in Friedrichstadt
195. Walter Karl Pastor in Riga
196. Weide Julius Pastor zu Grobin
197. Weidemann Theodor Organist in Siuxt
198. Weidemann J. Redacteur in Mitau
199. Welzer Karl Pastor zu Egypten und Demmen
200. Weyrich Theodor Oberpastor in Riga
201. Widberg Buchhalter, Mitau
202. Wilde Pastor, z. Z. in Birkenruhe
203. Wilpert Karl Past. emer. zu Siuxt. Gest. 28 October 1901
204. Wissendorff Henri Mitglied des Gelehrten Com. des Min. d. Volksaufklär.
205. Wolter Ed. Mag. Docent in St. Petersburg. CM
206. Zimmermann Ludwig Pastor zu Lennewarden, Propst
207. Zubati Professor Dr. Smechow in Böhmen. CM

== See also ==
- Estonian Learned Society
- Lithuanian Literary Society
- Finnish Literary Society
