= Dobele crater =

Impact crater in Latvia

- Location within Latvia
- Location: Dobele, Latvia; 56°35′N 23°15′E

Impact crater structure
- Confidence: Confirmed
- Diameter: 4.5 km (2.8 mi)
- Age: 290 ± 35 Ma; Late Carboniferous to Late Permian
- Exposed: No
- Drilled: Yes

Dobele crater is an impact crater in Latvia under the town of Dobele. The crater is not exposed at the surface. It is 4.5 km (2.8 mi) in diameter and estimated to be 290 ± 35 million years old (Cisuralian epoch of the Permian period).
