= Bernhard Bielenstein =

Baltic German architect (1877–1959)

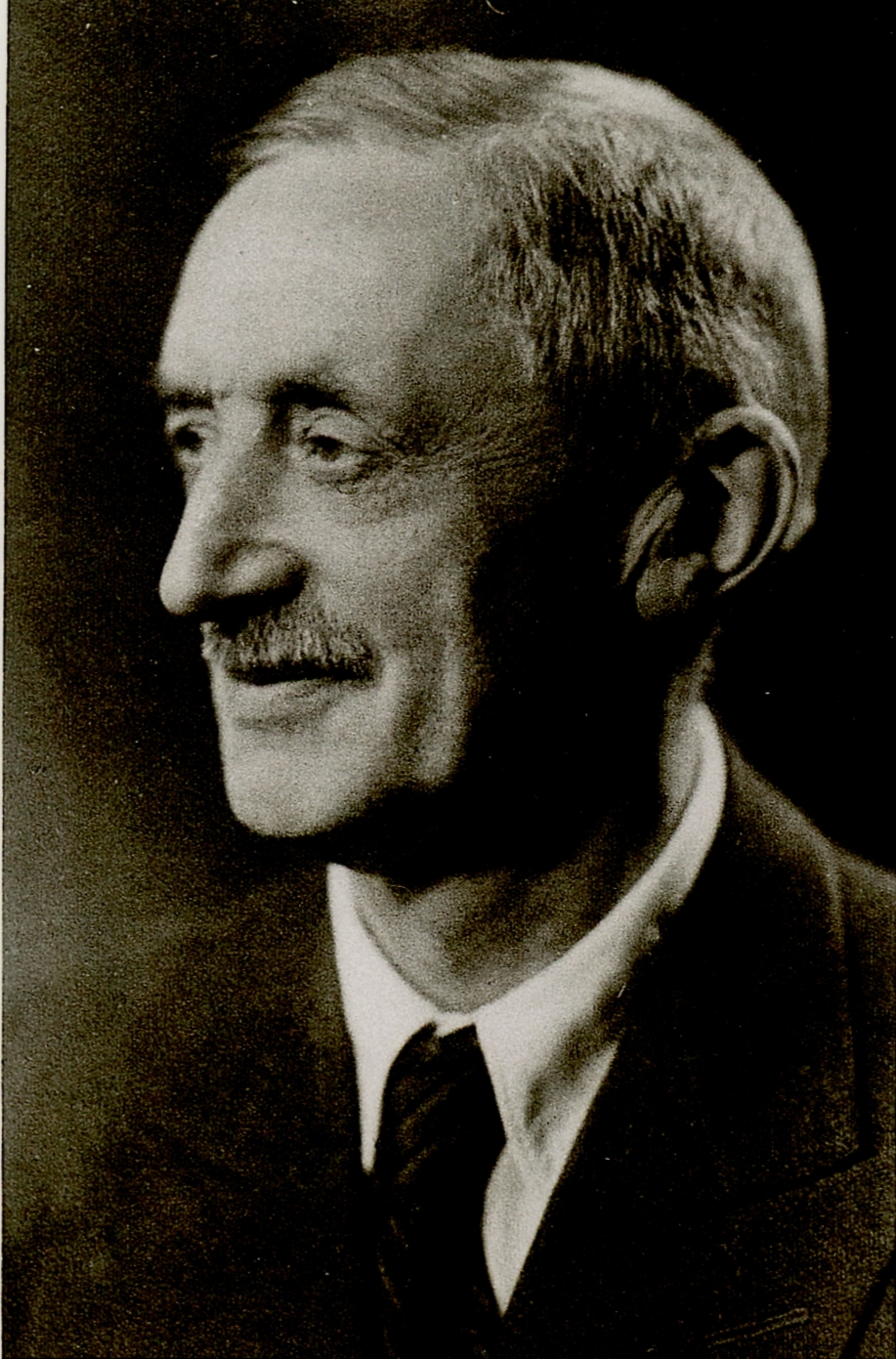
- Born: 21 August [O.S. 9] 1877; Doblen, Kreis Doblen, Courland Governorate, Russian Empire (present-day Dobele, Dobele Municipality, Latvia)
- Died: 14 April 1959 (aged 82); Heilbronn, Landkreis Heilbronn, Baden-Württemberg, West Germany
- Known for: Architecture
- Movement: Art Nouveau

Bernhard Max August Bielenstein (21 August [O.S. 9 August] 1877 – 14 April 1959) was a Baltic German architect.

Bernhard Bielenstein was born in Doblen in a family of pastor, linguist and ethnographer August Johann Gottfried Bielenstein. He studied at the Riga Polytechnic Institute (present-day Riga Technical University). He graduated in 1904, and thereafter continued his studies in Berlin. In 1905 he set up his own architectural firm in Riga. In addition, he worked at the Riga Mortgage Association. In 1907 he married Betty von Bergmann. During World War I, he worked at different military offices in Pskov and Vitebsk. From 1918, he again worked as an architect in Riga. In 1925 Riga German Landlord Society elected Bielenstein as a secretary. In 1931 he became member of the board of the Riga sickness fund. In 1939, he together with majority of Baltic Germans moved to Germany. He died in Heilbronn. In Riga he designed more than 30 residential buildings, mostly in a rationalistic form of Art Nouveau, though some of his buildings also bear influences from Latvian National Romantic style.

== Gallery ==
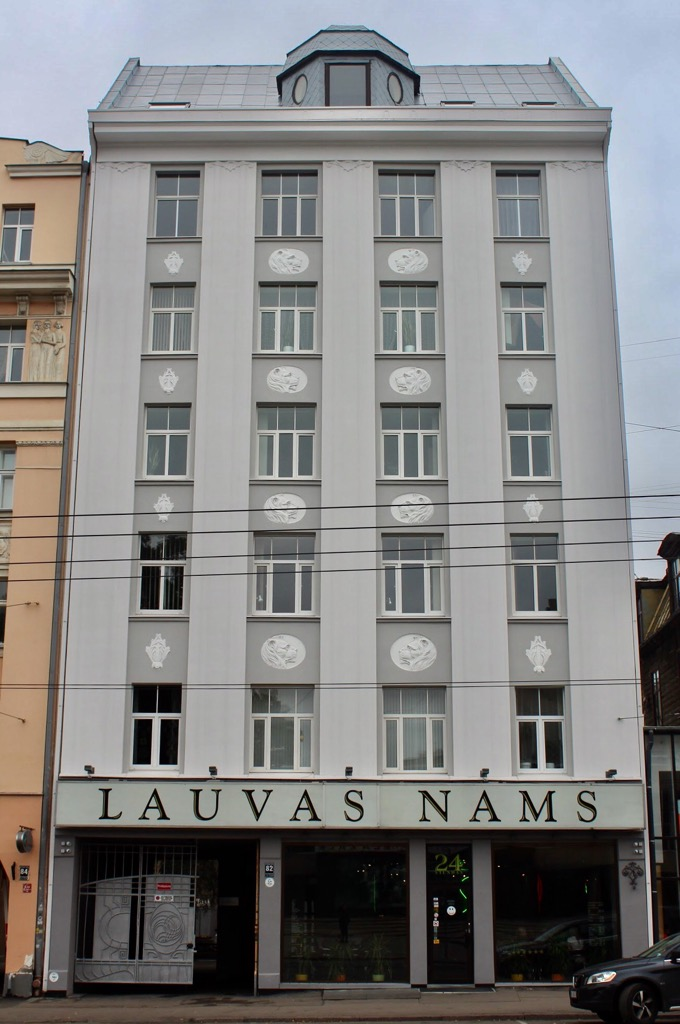
Building at Brīvības iela 82, Riga (1913)

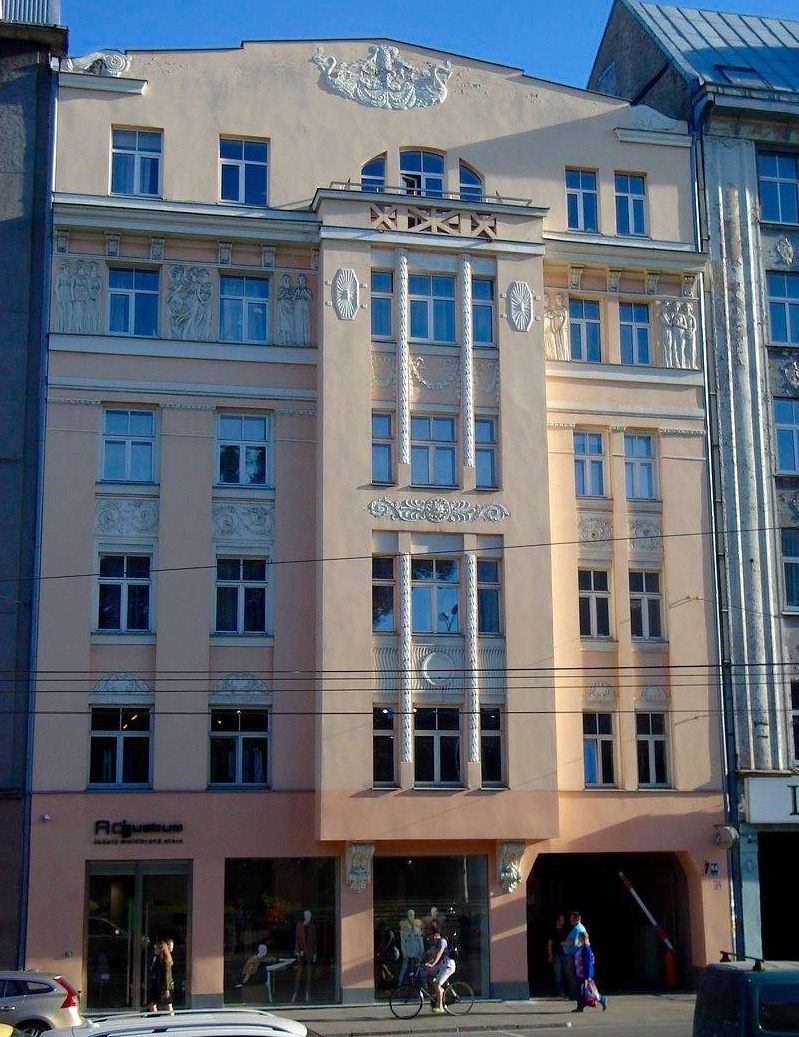
Building at Brīvības iela 84, Riga (1912)

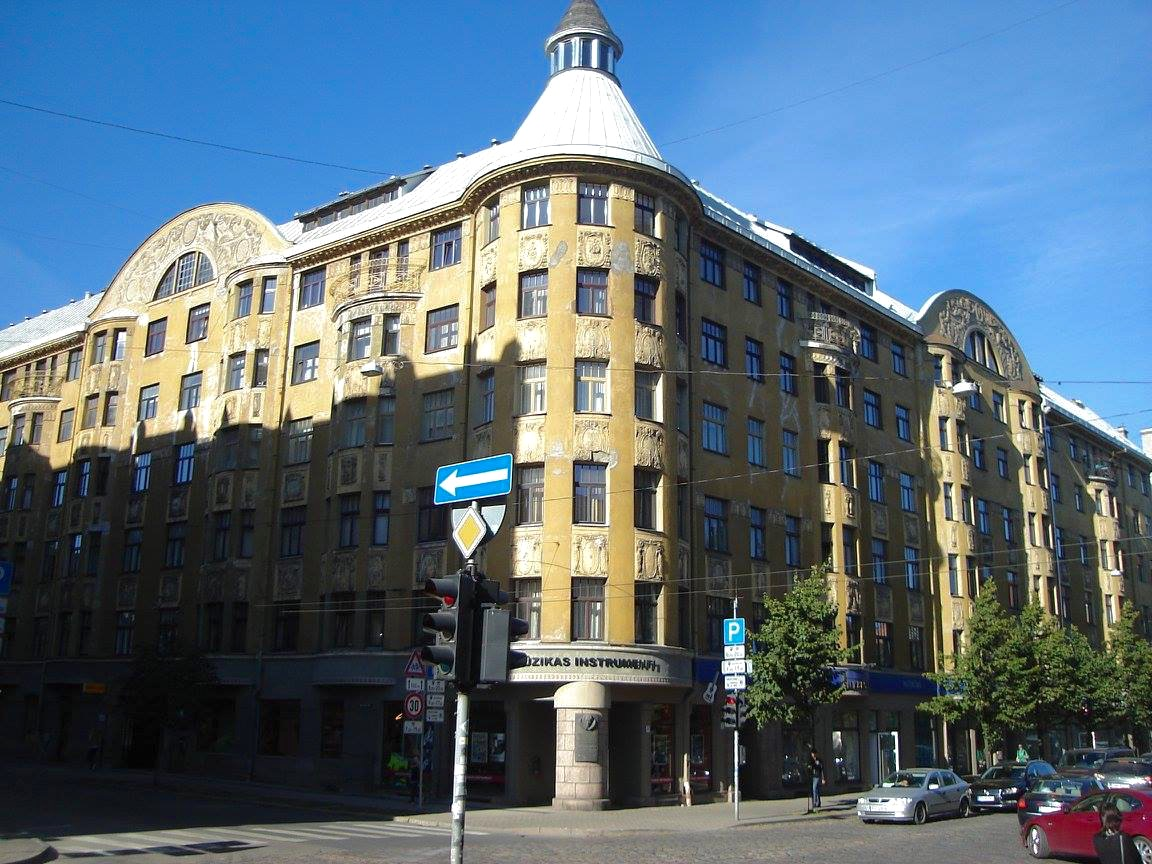
Building at Bruņinieku iela 27, Riga (1911)

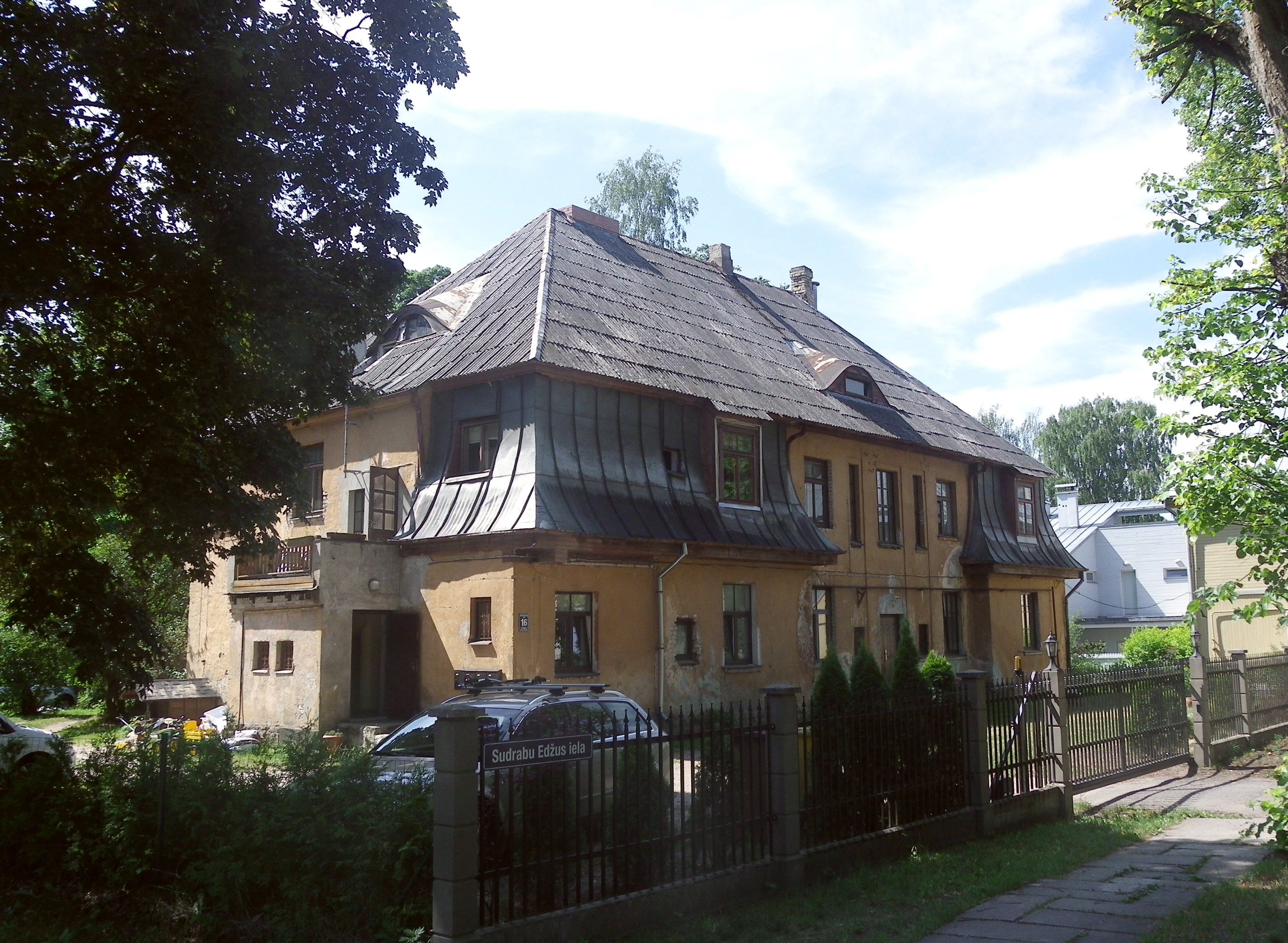
Bielenstein family mansion at Sudrabu Edžus iela 16, Riga (1912)

== See also ==
- Art Nouveau architecture in Riga
