= Dobele =

Town and capital of Dobele Municipality, Latvia

- Town
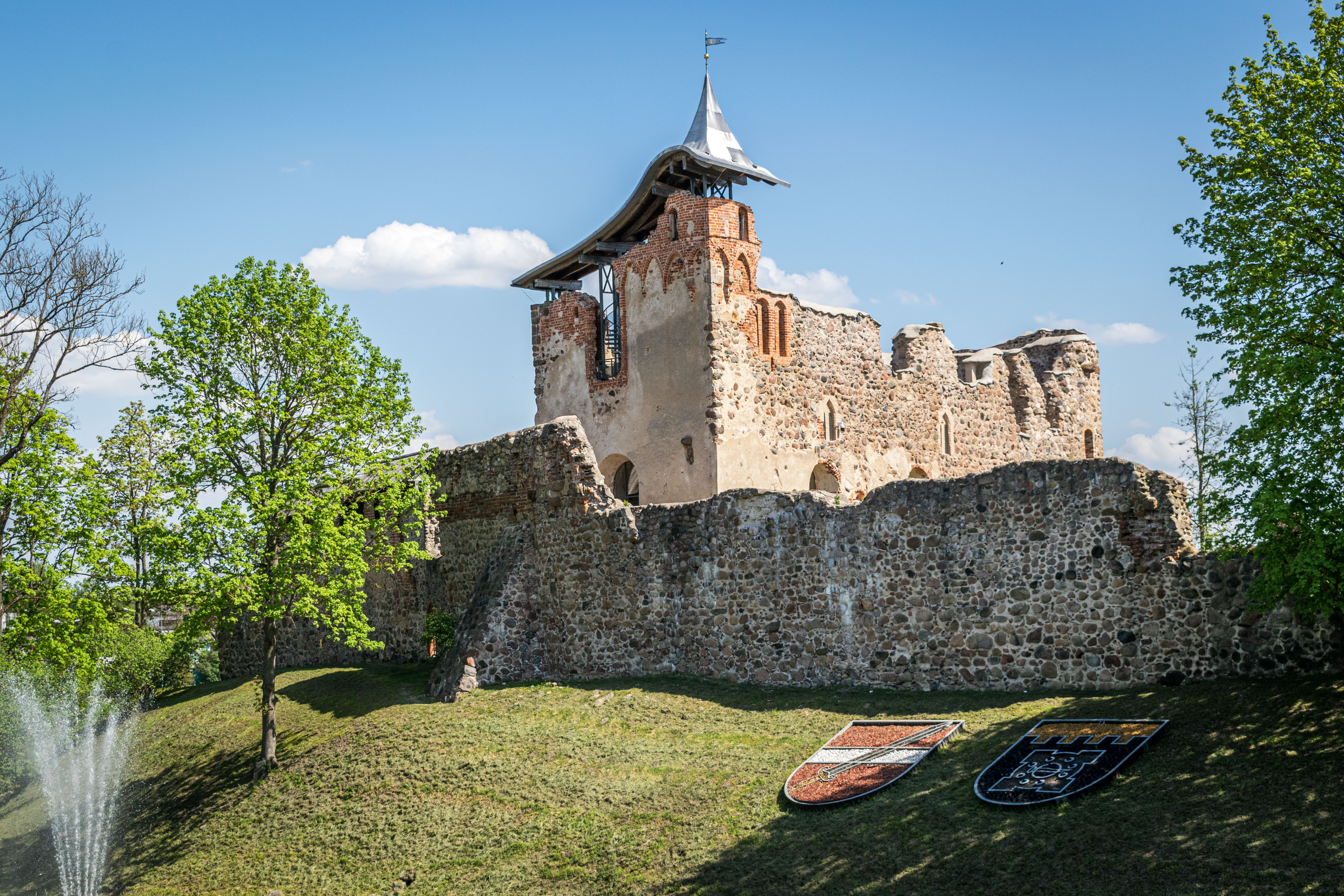
- Dobele castle ruins.

- Flag Coat of arms

- Location in Latvia
- Coordinates: 56°37′N 23°16′E
- Country: Latvia
- Municipality: Dobele
- Town rights: 1917

Government
  - Mayor: Andrejs Spridzāns

Area
  - Total: 8.03 km^{2} (3.10 sq mi)
  - Land: 7.88 km^{2} (3.04 sq mi)
  - Water: 0.15 km^{2} (0.058 sq mi)

Population (2026)
  - Total: 8,429
  - Density: 1,070/km^{2} (2,770/sq mi)
- Time zone: UTC+2 (EET)
  - Summer (DST): UTC+3 (EEST)
- Postal code: LV-370(1-2)
- Calling code: +371 637
- Climate: Dfb
- Website: www.dobele.lv

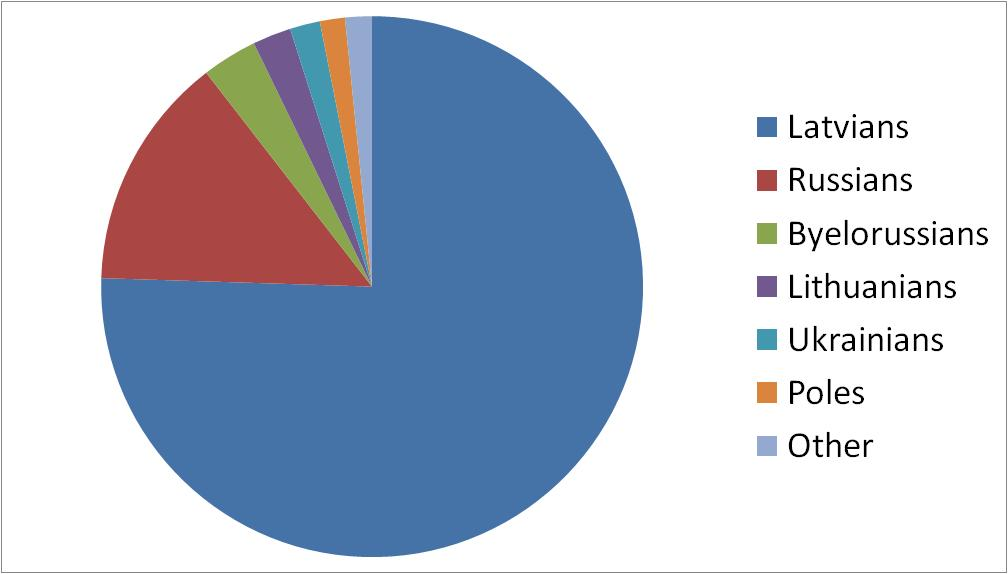
Proportional distribution of different ethnicities in Dobele

Dobele (Latvian pronunciation: [dobele]; German: Doblen) is a town and seat of Dobele Municipality in the Semigallia region of Latvia. It is located near the center of Latvia on the banks of the river Bērze. It received town rights in 1917 whilst being a part of the German occupied Courland Governorate during the First World War. As of 2020, the population was 8,856.

== Name origin ==
In a German document from 1254 a place name Dubelene or Dubelone has been used. Later the names Doblene, Doblenen and Doblen also have been used for this inhabited location. The original place name can be reconstructed as Dobelene or Dobeliene, but its origins are linked to the place name duobe (pit or delve) and duobele (dip, dimple). Most likely, the reconstructed place name Dobelene meant 'populated area in a dimple'.

== History ==
Dobele is first mentioned in historical sources in 1254; however, at that time it was only a wooden fortress which was destroyed during the Semigallian War of Independence (1279–1290), the final phase of the Northern Crusades in Latvia. On its spot, a new stone castle was erected in 1335 and a small settlement grew up around it. The ruins of this fortress are still visible and are in the process of being restored. The original church was constructed in 1495, and eventually, the fortress developed into a trading post. In the 17th century, a watermill, sawmill, a cardigan mill, and a vinegar-works were constructed during the reign of duke Jacob Kettler. In 1927, the Jelgava–Liepāja Railway connected the city to other important towns and a period of development resulted.

== Industry ==
Dobele is the home of many large enterprises, such as the AS Dobeles dzirnavnieks mill (a subsidiary of Tartu Mill), the Seal/Spodrība chemical plant, the Baltic Candles candle factory, steel structure and component maker SIA East Metal. The headquarters of the country-wide fuel station network Astarte-Nafta and the construction material manufacturer Tenax Grupa are also located within the town.

== Schools ==
- Dobele State Gymnasium

== Culture ==
The town of Dobele has a Cultural Centre as well as a museum. The town is also the location of 8 nationally protected monuments, such as the old castle, church, and town hall.

There are several annual festivals and holidays celebrated including the Ielīgosim Jāņus, the Midsummer celebration, and the jubileja, or festival, which changes yearly.

== Climate ==
Dobele has a humid continental climate (Köppen Dfb).

Climate data for Dobele (1991-2020 normals, extremes 1949-present)
Month	Jan	Feb	Mar	Apr	May	Jun	Jul	Aug	Sep	Oct	Nov	Dec	Year
Record high °C (°F)	10.4 (50.7)	13.8 (56.8)	20.0 (68.0)	26.5 (79.7)	30.6 (87.1)	33.1 (91.6)	35.8 (96.4)	35.1 (95.2)	30.7 (87.3)	23.5 (74.3)	16.8 (62.2)	11.5 (52.7)	35.8 (96.4)
Mean daily maximum °C (°F)	−0.3 (31.5)	0.0 (32.0)	4.5 (40.1)	12.0 (53.6)	17.7 (63.9)	20.9 (69.6)	23.7 (74.7)	23.0 (73.4)	17.5 (63.5)	10.7 (51.3)	4.7 (40.5)	1.2 (34.2)	11.3 (52.4)
Daily mean °C (°F)	−2.6 (27.3)	−2.7 (27.1)	0.7 (33.3)	6.6 (43.9)	12.0 (53.6)	15.6 (60.1)	18.1 (64.6)	17.4 (63.3)	12.6 (54.7)	7.0 (44.6)	2.5 (36.5)	−0.8 (30.6)	7.2 (45.0)
Mean daily minimum °C (°F)	−5.2 (22.6)	−5.6 (21.9)	−2.8 (27.0)	1.9 (35.4)	6.2 (43.2)	10.0 (50.0)	12.7 (54.9)	12.1 (53.8)	8.1 (46.6)	3.6 (38.5)	0.3 (32.5)	−3.1 (26.4)	3.2 (37.7)
Record low °C (°F)	−34.1 (−29.4)	−35.9 (−32.6)	−25.7 (−14.3)	−13.2 (8.2)	−3.7 (25.3)	0.3 (32.5)	4.7 (40.5)	1.9 (35.4)	−3.7 (25.3)	−9.2 (15.4)	−21.7 (−7.1)	−31.9 (−25.4)	−35.9 (−32.6)
Average precipitation mm (inches)	38.6 (1.52)	29.6 (1.17)	29.6 (1.17)	32.3 (1.27)	42.9 (1.69)	66.6 (2.62)	77.1 (3.04)	64.0 (2.52)	53.8 (2.12)	62.2 (2.45)	45.0 (1.77)	38.8 (1.53)	580.5 (22.87)
Average precipitation days (≥ 1 mm)	9	8	8	7	8	9	10	9	9	11	10	10	108
Average relative humidity (%)	88.0	86.0	79.4	71.1	68.6	73.0	75.2	76.2	81.5	86.3	89.9	89.9	80.4
Mean monthly sunshine hours	40.1	69.6	147.1	209.2	291.4	286.8	305.5	262.9	175.9	107.7	40.5	30.7	1,967.4
Source 1: LVĢMC
Source 2: NOAA (precipitation days, humidity 1991-2020)

== Demographics ==
Latvians make up 75.5% of the population while Russians, at 14%, are a significant minority. Other groups include Belarusians - 3.3%, Lithuanians - 2.3%, Ukrainians -1.8%, Poles - 1.5%, and 1.6% are of other nationalities.

Historical population

Year	Pop.	±%
1840	100	—
1881	1,083	+983.0%
1914	2,000	+84.7%
1915	375	−81.2%
1925	1,551	+313.6%
1935	2,470	+59.3%
1943	2,650	+7.3%
1959	6,246	+135.7%
1979	13,027	+108.6%
1989	15,023	+15.3%
1997	12,765	−15.0%
2007	11,146	−12.7%
2008	11,201	+0.5%
2009	11,241	+0.4%

Year	Pop.	±%
2010	11,214	−0.2%
2011	11,066	−1.3%
2012	10,895	−1.5%
2013	10,771	−1.1%
2014	10,540	−2.1%
2015	10,348	−1.8%
2016	10,113	−2.3%
2017	9,868	−2.4%
2018	9,702	−1.7%
2019	9,575	−1.3%
2020	9,452	−1.3%
2021	9,371	−0.9%
2022	9,225	−1.6%

Source: Latvian Geospatial Information Agency

== Gallery ==
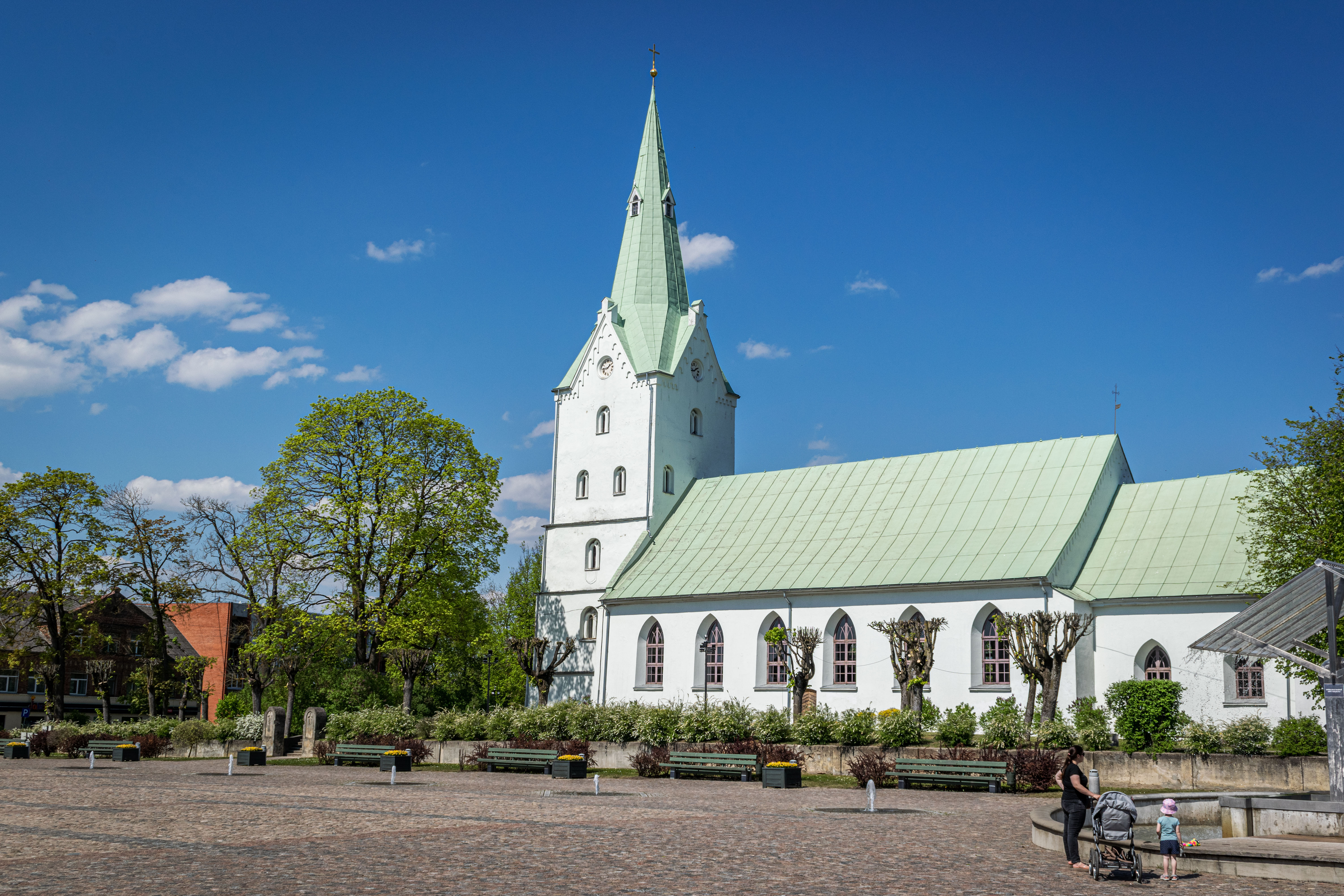
Dobele Lutheran church (1495)

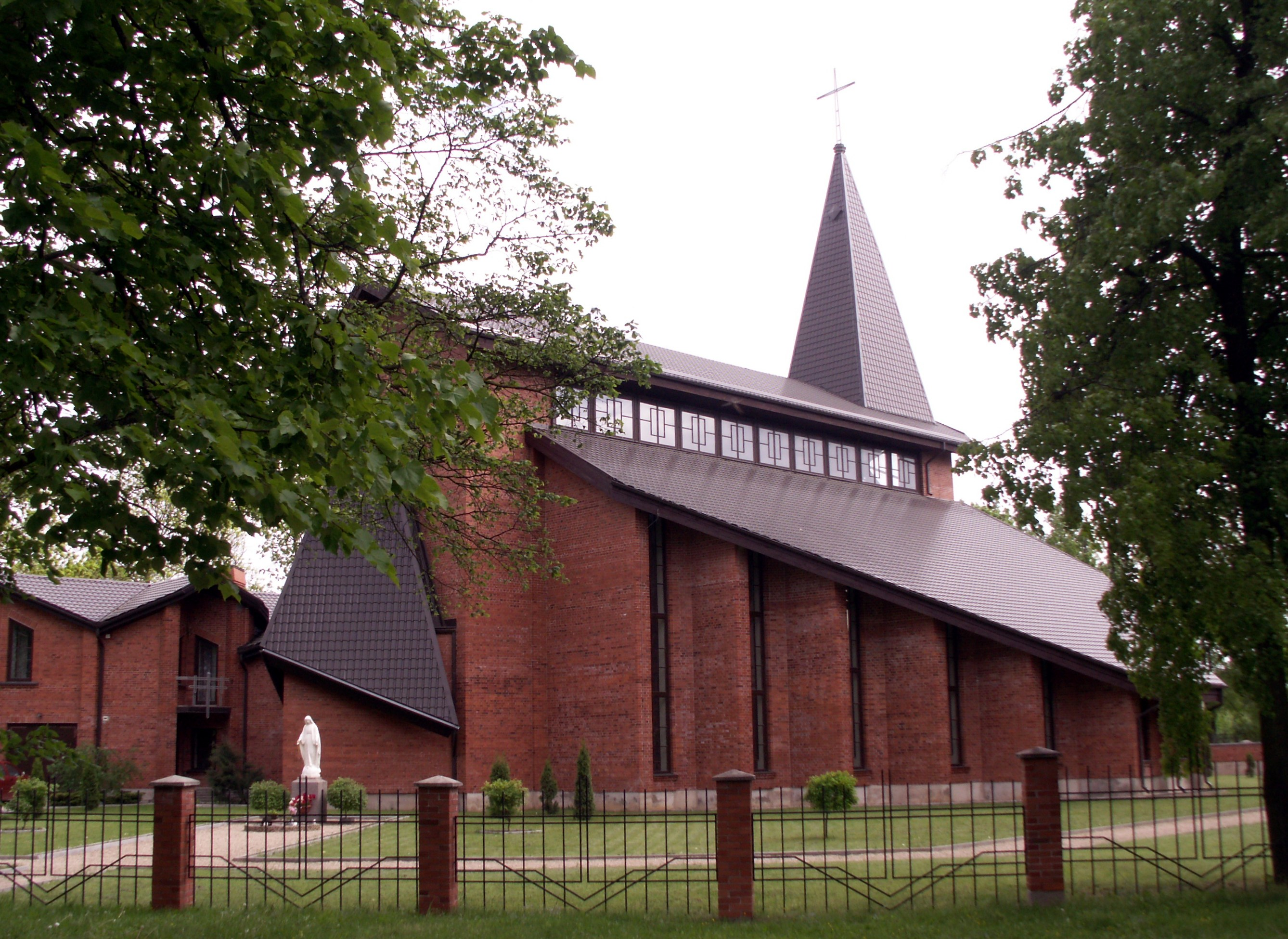
Catholic church (2003)

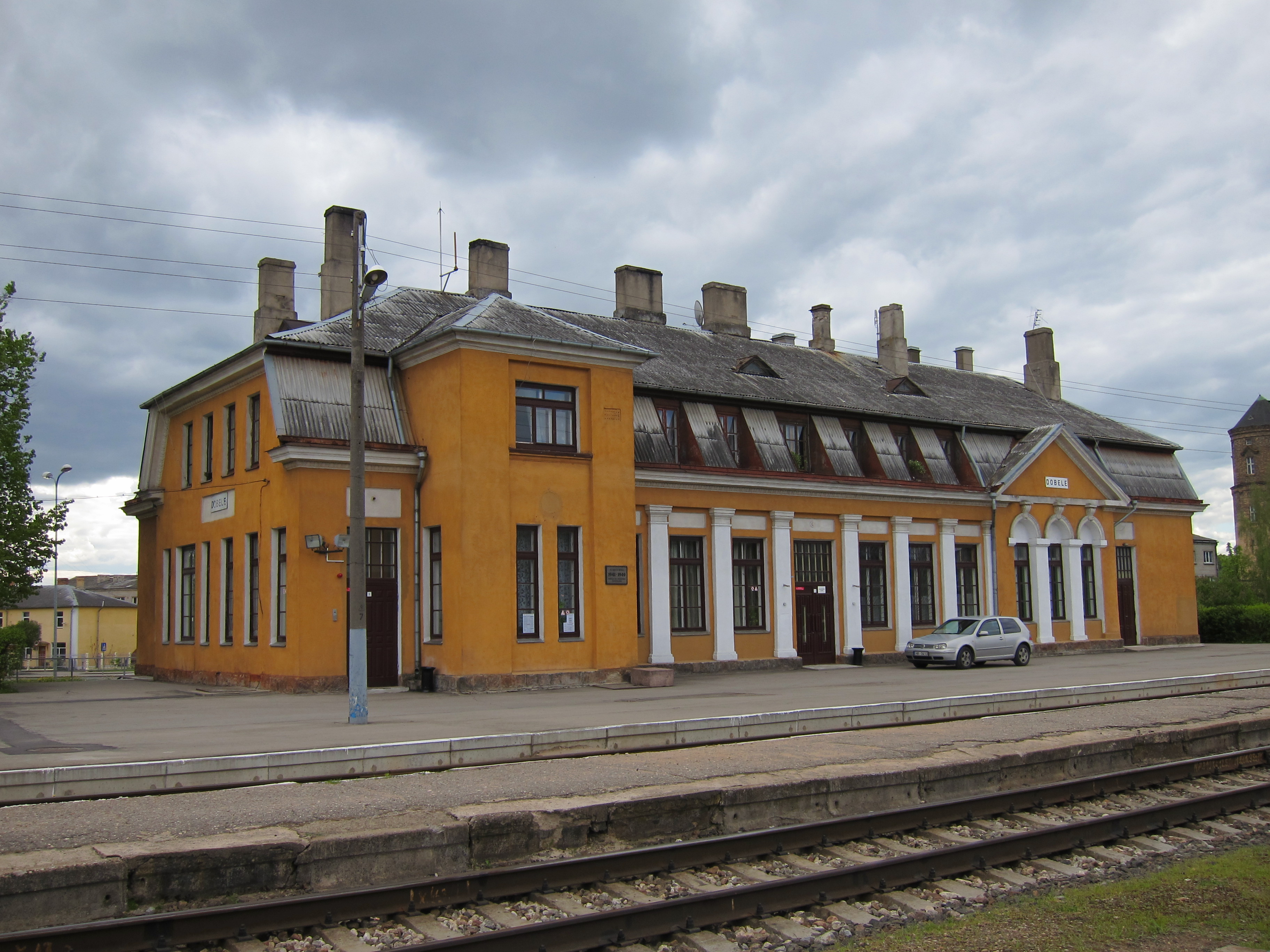
Dobele Railway Station (Built in 1929)

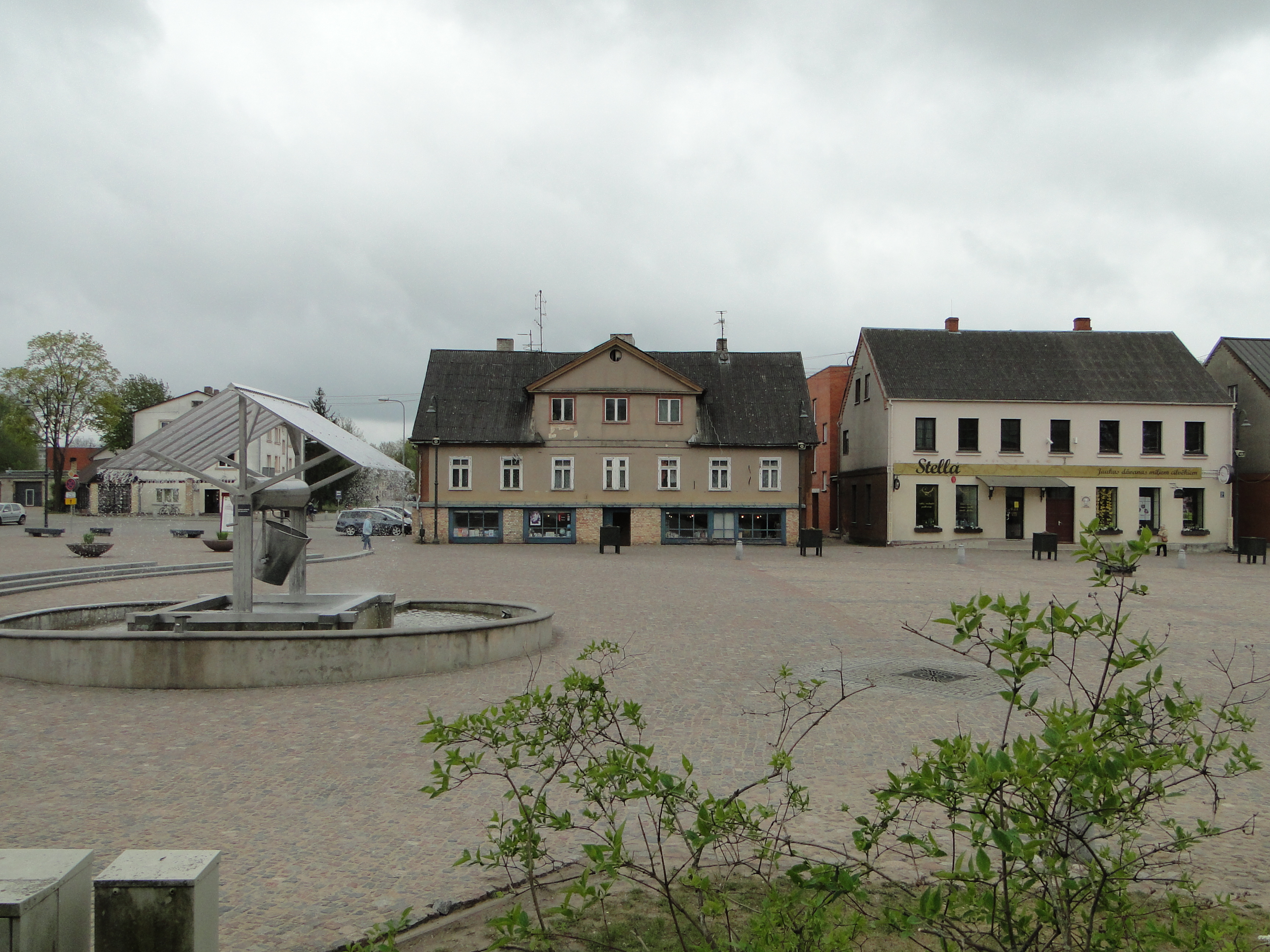
The main square

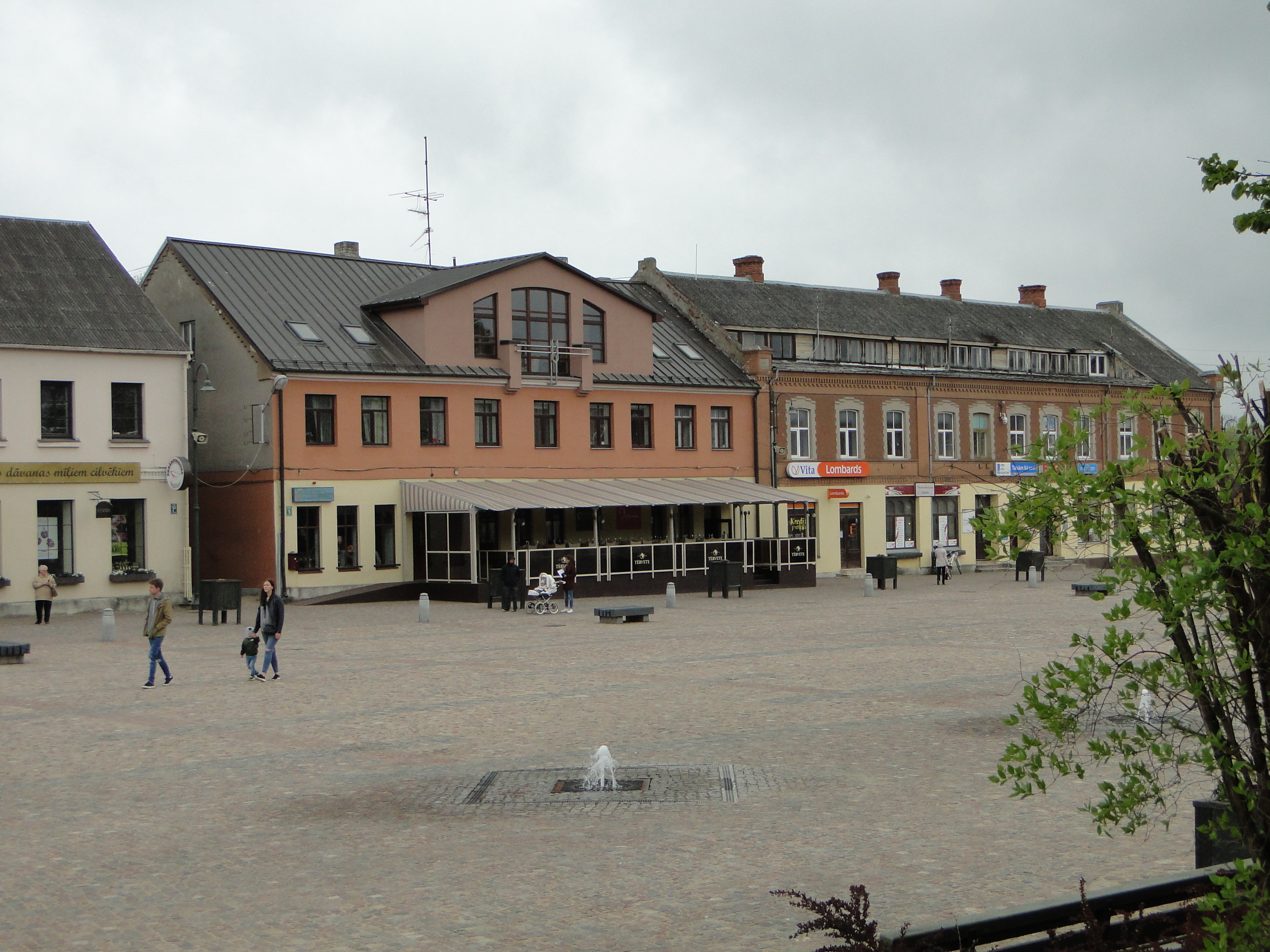
19th-century buildings in the city center

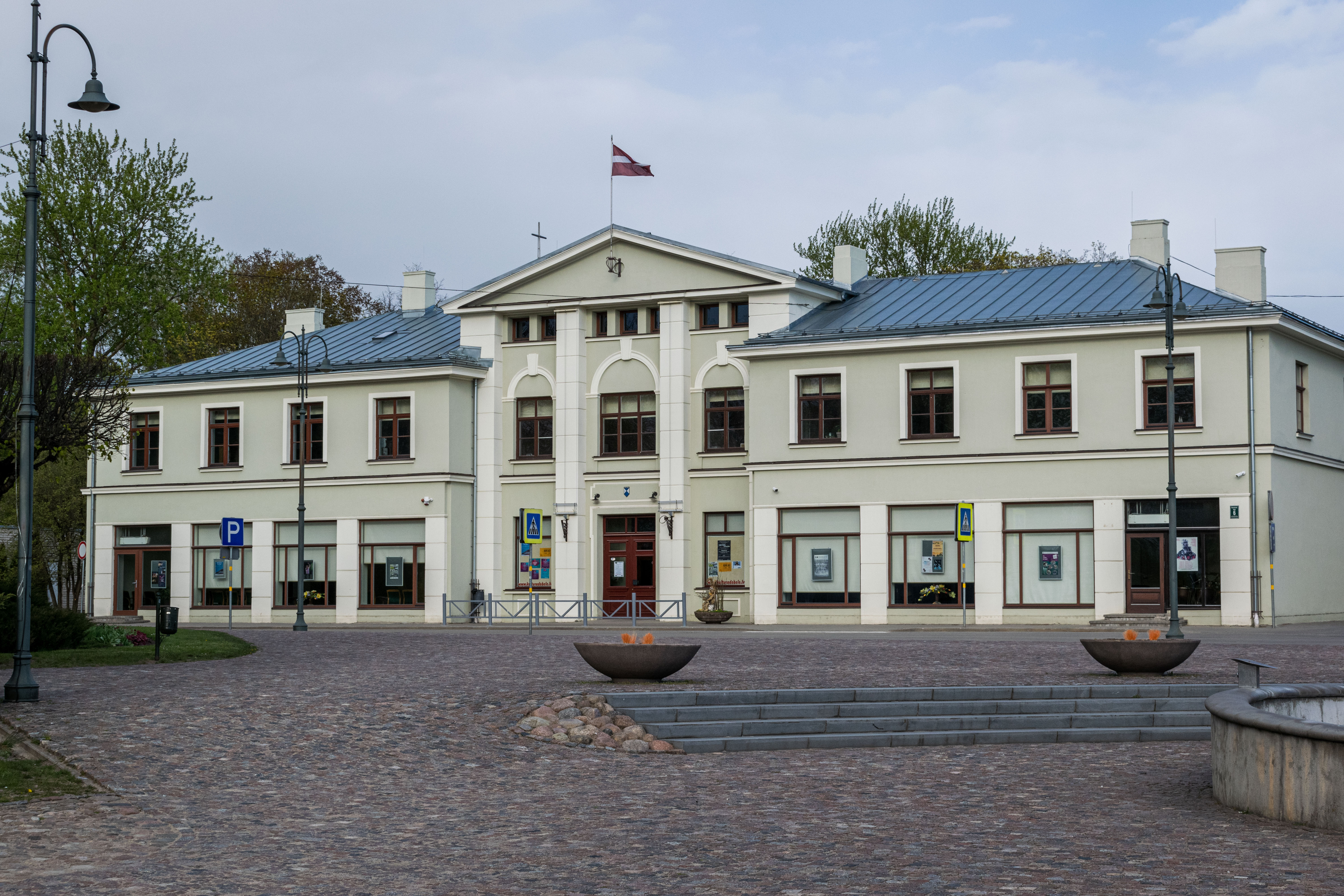
Latvian society house (Built in 1939)

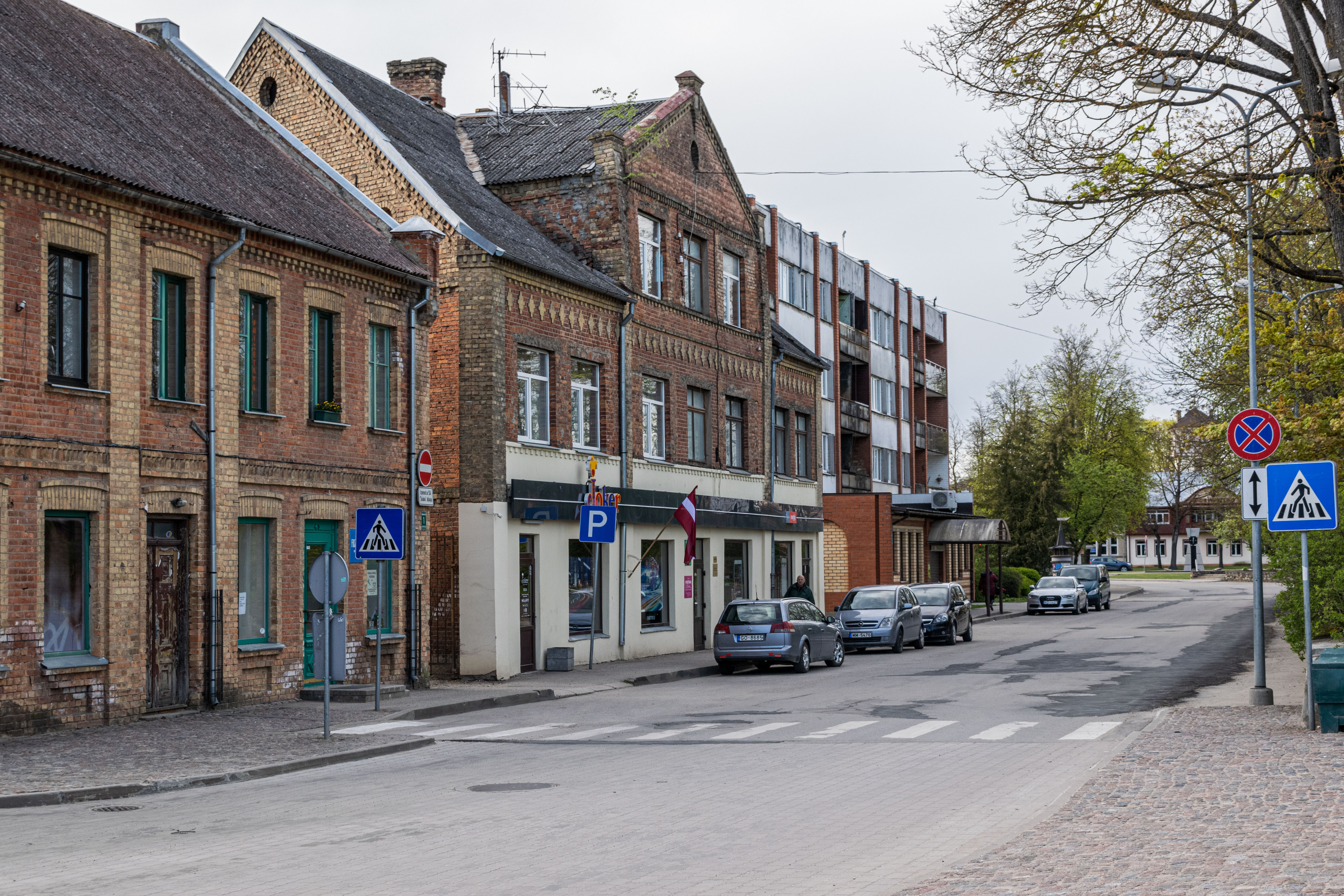
Uzvaras street in Dobele

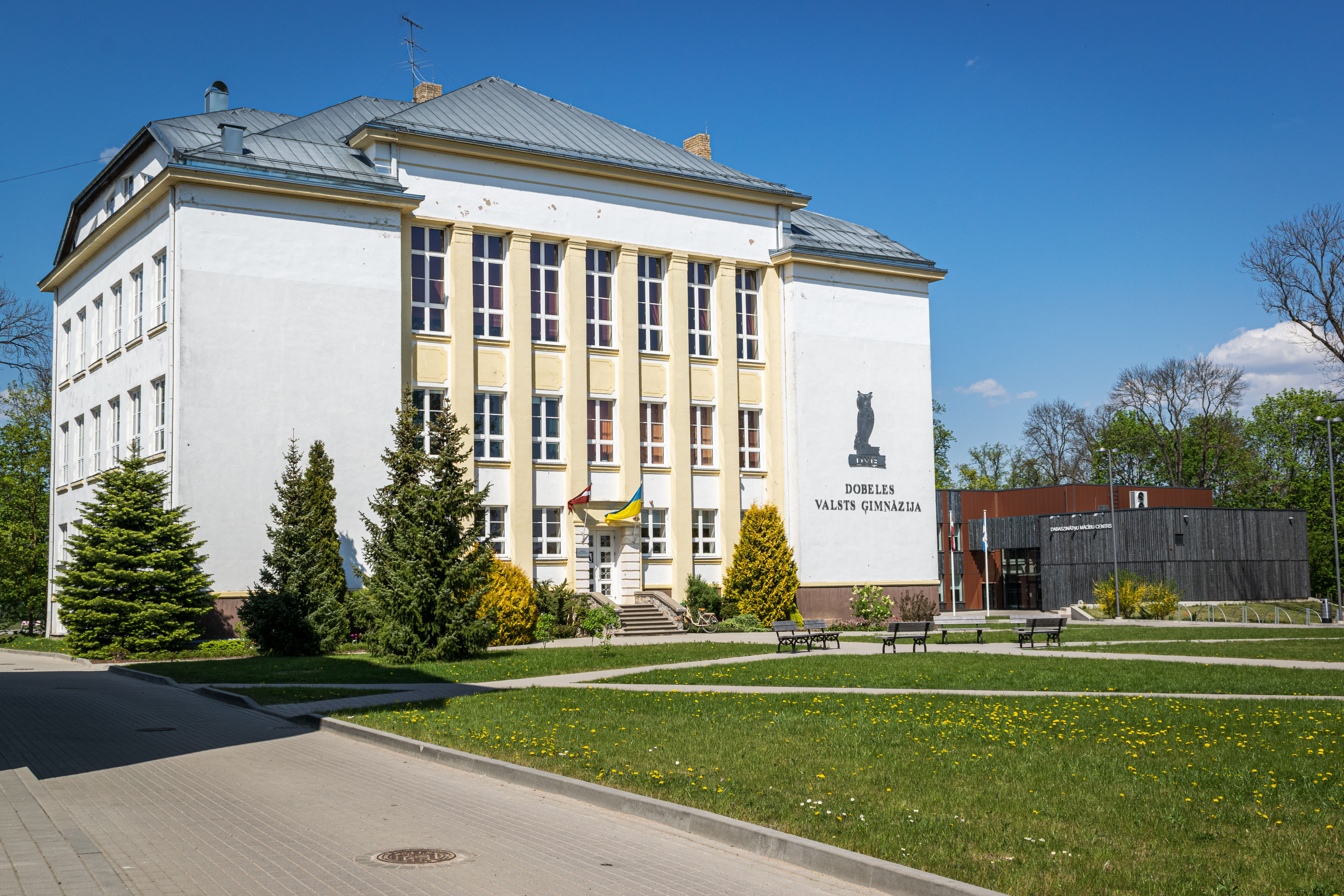
Building of Dobele State gymnasium (Built in 1940)

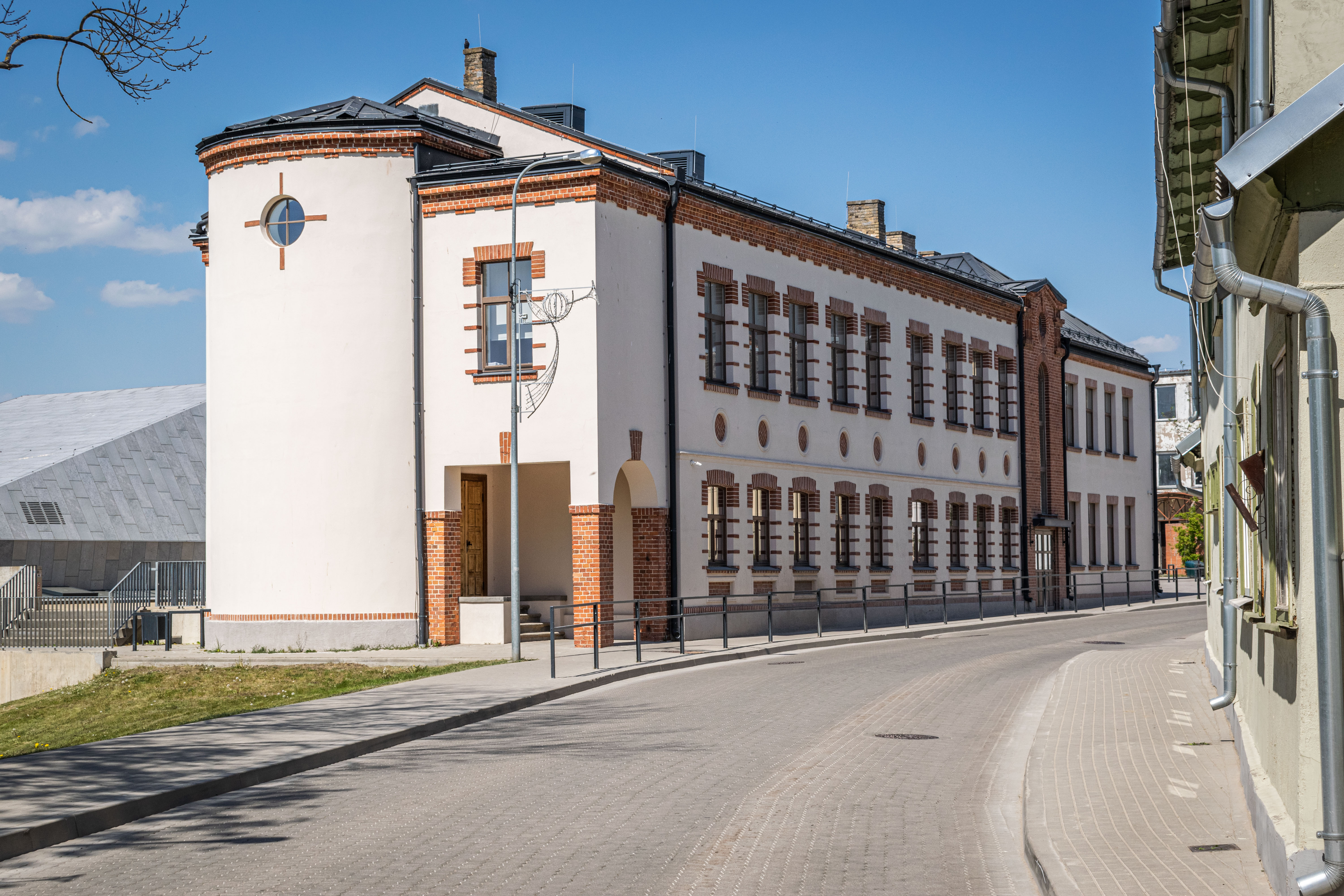
Music school in Dobele (Built in early 20th. century)

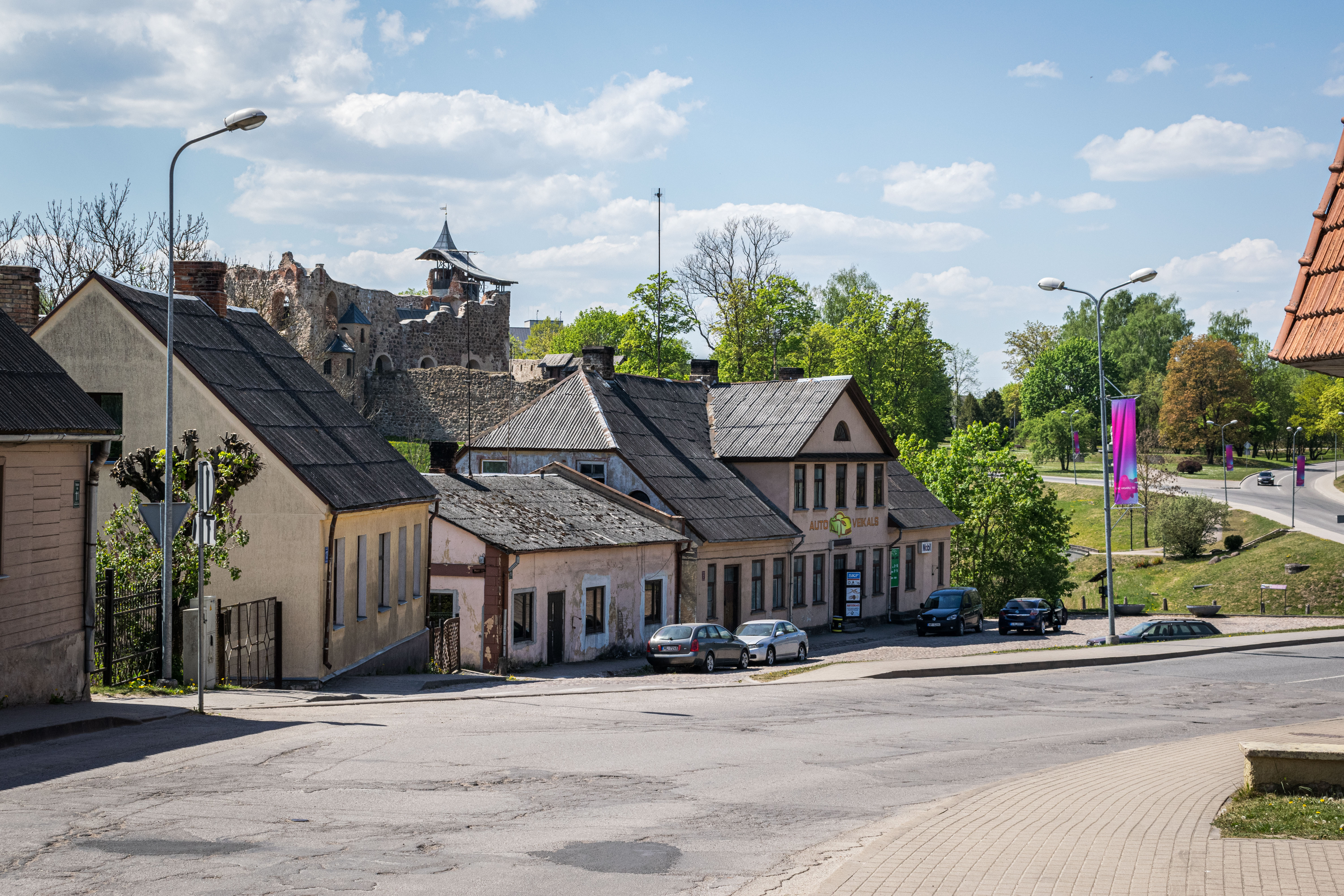
View to Dobele Castle from Viestura street.

== Notable people ==
- Oskars Bārs (1848–1914), architect. he designed and constructed the Jelgava's synagogue
- Bernhard Bielenstein (1877–1959), a Baltic German architect.
- Gunārs Saliņš (1924–2010), modernist poet, within the Latvian lyric poetry tradition.
- Alexei Kudrin (born 1960), politician, economist, Minister of Finance from 2000 to 2011.
- Linda Mūrniece (born 1970), politician, journalist, Minister for the Interior, 2009 – 2011
- Uldis Augulis (born 1972), politician, Welfare Minister, 2009/2010 and 2014/2016 and 2023/2025.
- Gatis Eglītis (born 1978), politician, Welfare Minister, 2021/2022
- Lauris Reiniks (born 1979), musician, pop music singer, songwriter, television host and actor.
- Kristine Balanas (born 1990), violinist and violin laureate

=== Sport ===
- Aleksandrs Jackēvičs (born 1958), judoka, bronze medallist at the 1980 Summer Olympics
- Viktors Ščerbatihs (born 1974), weightlifter, silver-medallist in the 2004 Summer Olympics and bronze medallist 2008 Summer Olympics
- Andris Naudužs (born 1975), racing cyclist
- Māris Bogdanovičs (born 1991), cyclist
- Emīls Liepiņš (born 1992), cyclist
- Agate Rašmane (born 1997), sports shooter, she competed in the women's air pistol at the 2020 Summer Olympics
- Ritvars Suharevs (born 1999), weightlifter, competed at the 2024 Summer Olympics
- Kristers Tobers (born 2000), footballer, played over 150 games and 37 for Latvia of which he is team captain
- Daniela Ivanova (born 2002), women's weightlifter

== See also ==
- List of cities in Latvia
- Dobele crater
- Dobele Municipality#Notable people
