= List of ambassadors to Latvia =

This is a list of ambassadors to Latvia. Note that some ambassadors are responsible for more than one country while others are directly accredited to Riga.

== Current Ambassadors to Latvia ==
Sending country	Presentation of the credentials	Location of resident embassy	Ambassador
Albania	September 2014	Warsaw, Poland	Shpresa Kureta
Algeria	11.05.2010	Warsaw, Poland	Abdelkader Khemri
Andorra		Andorra la Vella, Andorra	Maria Noguer González (Chargé d'Affaires a.i.)
Angola	21.02.2012	Stockholm, Sweden	Brito António Sozinho
Argentina	19.06.2012	Helsinki, Finland	Daniel Pierini
Armenia	19.06.2012	Warsaw, Poland	Ara Aivazian
Australia	12.03.2013	Stockholm, Sweden	Gerald Thomson
Austria	16.08.2011	Riga, Latvia	Stefan Pehringer
Azerbaijan	09.11.2010	Riga, Latvia	Elman Zeynalov
Bangladesh	23.02.2010	Moscow, Russia	Saiful Hoque
Belarus	20.07.2006	Riga, Latvia	Aleksandr Gerasimenko
Belgium	18.10.2011	Riga, Latvia	Frank Arnauts
Benin	19.04.2011	Copenhagen, Denmark	Arlette Claudine Kpedetin Dagnon Vignikin
Bosnia and Herzegovina		Copenhagen, Denmark	Igor Dunderovič (Chargé d’Affaires a.i.)
Brazil	11.10.2011	Riga, Latvia	Leda Lucia Camargo
Bulgaria	20.10.2012	Warsaw, Poland	Vasiliy Hristov Takev
Burkina Faso	16.10.2012	Copenhagen, Denmark	Monique Ilboudo
Burundi	30.10.2025	Berlin, Germany	Annonciata Sendazirasa
Cambodia	07.11.2010	Moscow, Russia	Vanna Thay
Canada	31.01.2012	Riga, Latvia	John Morrison
Chile	20.11.2012	Stockholm, Sweden	Horacia del Valle Irarrazaval
China	17.08.2010	Riga, Latvia	Hu Yeshun
Colombia		Warsaw, Poland	Jairo Abadía (Chargé d’Affaires a.i.)
Costa Rica		Oslo, Norway	vacant
Cote d'Ivoire	22.01.2013	Moscow, Russia	Bernard Tanoh–Bouchoue
Croatia	21.04.2009	Stockholm, Sweden	Vladimir Matek
Cuba	15.01.2013	Helsinki, Finland	Enrique Orta Gonzáles
Cyprus	10.05.2011	Stockholm, Sweden	George Chacalli
Czech Republic	29.11.2011	Riga, Latvia	Pavol Šepel’ák
Denmark	12.10.2010	Riga, Latvia	Per Carlsen
Ecuador		Stockholm, Sweden	Édil Sánchez Trujillo (Chargé d'affaires a. i.)
Egypt	24.11.2009	Stockholm, Sweden	Mohamed Osama Taha Elmagdoub
El Salvador	14.03.2006	Stockholm, Sweden	Martin Alberto Rivera Gómez
Estonia	07.09.2010	Riga, Latvia	Mati Vaarmann
Ethiopia	23.10.2012	Brussels, Belgium	Kassu Yilala
Finland	09.09.2008	Riga, Latvia	Maria Serenius
France	12.01.2013	Riga, Latvia	Stéphane Visconti
Gabon		Moscow, Russia	vacant
Georgia	26.02.2008	Riga, Latvia	Konstantin Korkelia
Germany	10.07.2012	Riga, Latvia	Gudrun Masloch
Ghana	20.03.2012	Berlin, Germany	Paul King Aryene
Greece	31.01.2012	Riga, Latvia	Georgios Chatzimichelakis
Guatemala		Stockholm, Sweden	Brenda Paz de Ghassemi (Chargé d'affaires a. i.)
Holy See	03.06.2009	Vilnius, Lithuania	Luigi Bonazzi
Honduras	24.05.2011	Stockholm, Sweden	Hernán Antonio Bermúdez Aguilar
Hungary	11.01.2011	Riga, Latvia	Gábor Dobokay
Iceland	17.04.2018	Helsinki, Finland	Árni Þór Sigurðsson
India	07.12.2010	Helsinki, Finland	Ashok Sajjanhar
Indonesia	20.03.2012	Stockholm, Sweden	Dewa Made Juniarta Sastrawan
Iran	15.01.2013	Stockholm, Sweden	Hamid Shakeri Niasar
Iraq	20.03.2012	Warsaw, Poland	Saad Jawad Kindeel
Ireland	12.10. 2010	Riga, Latvia	Aidan Kirwan
Israel		Riga, Latvia	
Italy	25.10.2011	Riga, Latvia	Giovanni Polizzi
Japan	04.12.2012	Riga, Latvia	Toshiyuki Taga
Jordan	27.10.2009	The Hague, Netherlands	Khaldoun Talhouni
Kazakhstan	11.12.2019	Vilnius, Lithuania	Timur Primbetov
Kuwait	12.10.2010	Berlin, Germany	Musaed Rashed Ahmad Al-Haroun
Kyrgyzstan		Minsk, Belarus	Dmitry Li (Chargé d’Affaires a.i.)
Laos	16.10.2012	Berlin, Germany	Khamvone Phanouvong
Lebanon		Warsaw, Poland	Sonia Abou Azar (Chargé d’Affaires a.i.)
Libya		Stockholm, Sweden	Abdelmagid Ali Buzrigh (Chargé d’Affaires a.i.)
Lithuania	11.10.2011	Riga, Latvia	Ričardas Degutis
Luxembourg	16.08.2011	Warsaw, Poland	Conrad Aloyse Marie Bruch
Malaysia	19.04.2011	Helsinki, Finland	Cheah Choong Kit
Mali	24.02.2009	Moscow, Russia	Bréhima Coulibaly
Malta	16.12.2008	Valletta, Malta	Laurence Grech
Mauritania	09.11.2010	Moscow, Russia	Sidi Mohamed Ould Taleb Amar
Mexico		Stockholm, Sweden	Luis Enrique Mateo Franco Diaz de Leon (Chargé d'Affaires a.i.)
Moldova	26.11.2010	Riga, Latvia	Alexei Cracan
Mongolia		Warsaw, Poland	Tumen Tegshjargal (Chargé d'Affaires a.i.)
Morocco	10.04.2012	Stockholm, Sweden	Yahdih Bouchaab
Namibia	15.05.2012	Stockholm, Sweden	Daniel Rudolph Smith
Nepal		Moscow, Russia	vacant
Netherlands	20.09.2012	Riga, Latvia	Hendrik Gerrit Cornelis van den Dool
New Zealand	10.05.2011	Berlin, Germany	Peter Howard Rider
Nicaragua	25.10.2011	Helsinki, Finland	Ricardo José Alvarado Noguera
Nigeria	16.10.2012	Kyiv, Ukraine	Frank Ngozi Soh
North Korea	04.12.2012	Stockholm, Sweden	Pak Kwakng Cho
North Macedonia	22.06.2010	Warsaw, Poland	Fatmir Xheladini
Norway	29.09.2009	Riga, Latvia	Jan Grevstad
Oman	19.06.2010	London, UK	Abdulaziz bin Andullah bin Zahir Al Hinai
Pakistan		Stockholm, Sweden	Najeeb Durrani (Chargé d'Affaires a.i.)
Palestine		Helsinki, Finland	Nabil Alwazir
Panama		Warsaw, Poland	Yessenia Chalá (Chargé d'Affaires a.i.)
Paraguay	30.10.2012	Berlin, Germany	Raúl Alberto Florenin-Antola
Peru	26.10.2010	Helsinki, Finland	Pablo Hugo Portugal Rodriguez
Philippines	13.11.2007	Stockholm, Sweden	Maria Zeneida Angara-Collison
Poland	23.03.2010	Riga, Latvia	Jerzy Marek Nowakowski
Portugal	19.06.2012	Riga, Latvia	Manuel Marcelo Monteiro Curto
Qatar	12.04.2011	Warsaw, Poland	Hadi Nasser Mansour Khalil Al-Hajri
Romania	22.01.2013	Vilnius, Lithuania	Dan Adrian Balanescu
Russia	12.02.2008	Riga, Latvia	Alexander Veshnyakov
Rwanda	24.05.2011	The Hague, Netherlands	Immaculée Uwanyiligira
San Marino	27.06.2006	City of San Marino, San Marino	Federica Bigi
Serbia	24.05.2011	Stockholm, Sweden	Dušan Crnogorčević
Slovakia	03.06.2009	Riga, Latvia	Dušan Krištofík
Slovenia		Stockholm, Sweden	Matjaž Marko (Chargé d’Affaires a.i.)
South Africa	29.12.2011	Stockholm, Sweden	Mandisa Dona Marasha
South Korea	17.05.2011	Stockholm, Sweden	Seockjeong Eom
Sovereign Military Order of Malta		Riga, Latvia	Horst E. Rieger (Chargé d'Affaires a.i.)
Spain	12.04.2011	Riga, Latvia	Consuelo Femenía
Sri Lanka	29.11.2011	Stockholm, Sweden	Oshadhi Alahapperuma
Sweden	19.08.2008	Riga, Latvia	Mats Staffansson
Switzerland	10.07.2012	Riga, Latvia	Walter Haffner
Syria		Warsaw, Poland	Idris Mayya (Chargé d'Affaires a.i.)
Tajikistan	20.09.2012	Minsk, Belarus	Kozidavlat Koimdodov
Tanzania	12.04.2011	Täby, Sweden	Muhammed Mwinyi Haji Mzale
Thailand	20.11.2012	Oslo, Norway	Theerakun Niyom
Tunisia	02.09.2008	Warsaw, Poland	Ali Aidoudi
Turkey	26.07.2011	Riga, Latvia	Hayri Hayret Yalav
Turkmenistan	10.07.2012	Berlin, Germany	Khalmurat Agahanov
Ukraine	17.05.2011	Riga, Latvia	Anatoliy Oliynyk
United Arab Emirates	12.10.2010	Berlin, Germany	Mohammed Ahmad Al Mahmood
United Kingdom	06.06.2017	Riga, Latvia	Kathy Leach
United States	25.08.2009	Riga, Latvia	Judith Gail Garber
Uruguay		Stockholm, Sweden	Alejandro Garófali (Chargé d’affaires a.i.)
Uzbekistan	15.01.2013	Riga, Latvia	Afzal Artikov
Venezuela		Helsinki, Finland	Ernesto Navazio Mossucca (Chargé d´Affaires a. i.)
Vietnam	29.11.2011	Moscow, Russia	Pham Xuan Son
Zambia		Stockholm, Sweden	Eliphas J Chinyonga (Chargé d´Affaires a. i.)

== See also ==
- Foreign relations of Latvia
- List of diplomatic missions in Latvia
- List of diplomatic missions of Latvia
