= Bixio =

Bixio is a given name and surname. Notable people with the name include:

== Given name ==
- Bixio Celio, Swiss ice hockey player
- Bixio Cherubini, Italian lyricist, playwright and poet

== Surname ==
- Cesare Andrea Bixio (1896–1978), Italian composer
- Jacques Alexandre Bixio (1808–1875), French doctor, balloonist and politician
- Nino Bixio (1821–1873), Italian soldier and politician
  - Italian cruiser Nino Bixio
  - MV Nino Bixio
  - Nino Bixio-class cruiser
- Pietro Bixio, Italian cyclist

== See also ==
- Bixio Music Group
- Bigio
