= Per Carlsen =

Per Carlsen may refer to:

- Per Carlsén (born 1960), Swedish curler
- Per Carlsen (diplomat) (1948–2020), Danish diplomat, former Ambassador to Russia
