= Biggio =

Surname list

Biggio is a surname. Notable people with the surname include:

- Cavan Biggio (born 1995), American baseball player
- Craig Biggio (born 1965), American baseball player
- Piero Biggio (1937–2007), Italian Roman Catholic prelate

== See also ==
- Bigi
- Bigio
