= Estonia–Taiwan relations =

- Estonia: Taiwan

Estonia–Taiwan relations are the bilateral relations between Estonia and Taiwan. Although the two countries do not have official diplomatic relations, they have engaged in cultural and economic exchanges. The Taipei Mission in the Republic of Latvia also represents Taiwanese interests in Estonia in the absence of formal diplomatic relations.

== History ==
Prior to its retreat to Taiwan, the Republic of China government established diplomatic ties with Estonia in January 1939. The official ties have been suspended since the 1940 Soviet occupation of Estonia.

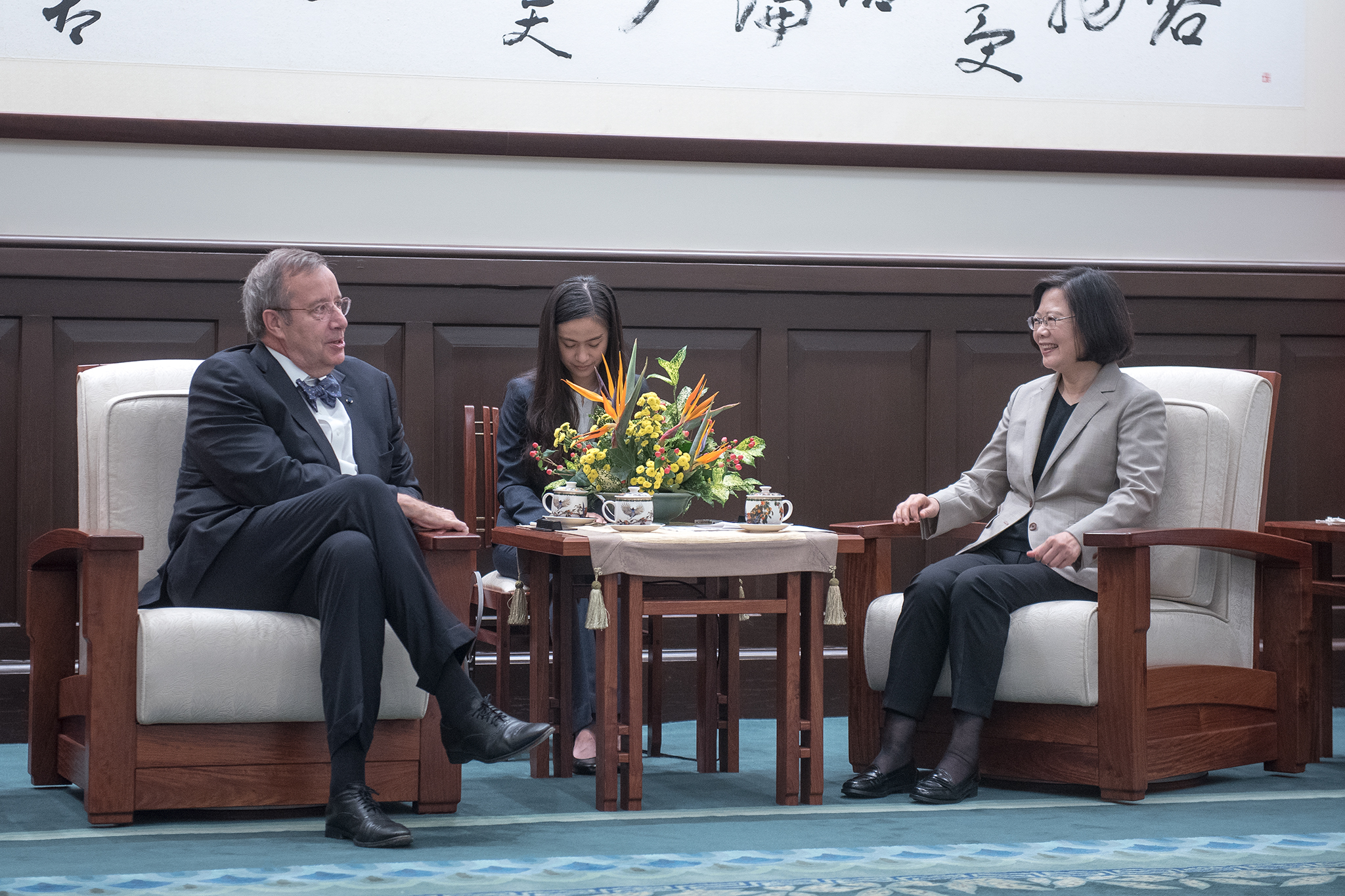
Former President of Estonia Toomas Hendrik Ilves meeting with President of Taiwan Tsai Ing-wen as part of APEC Digital Innovation Forum (2018)

On 2 November 2023, the cabinet of Estonia revised its approach to Taiwan to allow for the opening of a Taiwanese representative office in Estonia. Foreign minister Margus Tsahkna announced the policy and explained that it was meant to promote cultural and economic ties with Taiwan. Tsahkna said in a statement that "Estonia is ready to accept the creation of Taipei’s non-diplomatic economic or cultural representations" in Tallinn, despite protests from China. Further, Tsahkna pushed for Taiwan's participation in international organizations. In the same month, Taiwanese foreign minister Joseph Wu visited Estonia and gave a public speech.

In March 2024, parliamentarian Kristo Enn Vaga led a Riigikogu delegation to Taiwan and was received by Taiwanese president Tsai Ing-wen. During the visit, Vaga said Estonian lawmakers were working to push for opening the Taiwanese representative office, and Tsai thanked the Estonia-Taiwan Friendship Group for their 4 consecutive years of support for Taiwan's bid to participate in the World Health Organization. In August 2024, Marko Mihkelson visited Taiwan along with other Baltic foreign affairs committee chairs.

Mihkelson led the first-ever delegation from the Estonian parliamentary foreign affairs committee to Taiwan in November 2024. The delegation included deputy chairman of the committee, Henn Põlluaas. During a visit with President Lai Ching-te, Mihkelson expressed the sentiment that relations between the two countries had dramatically improved over the past few years and that he wished they could establish representative offices soon.

In May 2025, Estonia and Taiwan signed two memoranda of understanding to boost cooperation on the aerospace and defense sector. The aim is to strengthen joint development in emerging technologies, build new resilient supply chains resilience, and facilitate industrial partnerships between Estonian and Taiwanese firms.

In 2025, Taiwanese media reported that the proposal to establish Taiwan's representative office in Tallinn had stalled due to a disagreement over its name. Taiwan had requested the name of the office to include the word "Taiwan," similar to its office in Lithuania, while Estonia rejected the request.

== Aid and development ==
In April 2020, at the outset of the COVID-19 pandemic, Taiwan donated 80,000 surgical masks to the Estonian Red Cross as part of its respirator diplomacy.

=== Ukraine relief efforts ===
In May 2022, after the Russian invasion of Ukraine, the Taiwanese government donated US$1 million to the Estonia Refugee Council as part of a larger war relief and humanitarian assistance effort. In June 2024, the Taipei Mission in the Republic of Latvia signed an agreement with the Estonian Centre for International Development to support Estonia's efforts to build refugee shelters. As part of the agreement, Taiwan was donating an additional US$1.2 million.

Working with Estonian companies, Taiwan donated 1.1 million medical masks to Ukrainian health care institutions as part of a joint relief effort. Kristo Enn Vaga led a delegation to Taiwan in February 2025 to receive the masks.

== Trade ==
In 2022, bilateral trade between Estonia and Taiwan totaled approximately $151.6 million, with Estonia exporting around $30.6 million in goods to Taiwan and importing roughly $121 million from Taiwan.

Estonia's primary exports to Taiwan included broadcasting equipment ($10.6M), video displays ($2.7M), and titanium ($2.6M). Conversely, Taiwan mainly exported integrated circuits ($15.3M), iron fasteners ($11.1M), and stainless steel ($9.6M) to Estonia. In 2020, Estonia's service exports to Taiwan amounted to $2.63 million, with travel ($1.3M), transportation ($0.7M), and business services ($0.5M) being the highest-value sectors.

== See also ==
- Foreign relations of Estonia
- Foreign relations of Taiwan
