= Bigio =

Bigio is an Italian surname. Notable people with this surname include:

- Gilbert Bigio (born c. 1935), Haitian businessman
- Guido Bigio (1881–1913), Italian racing car driver and chemical engineer
- Marco Bigio (fl. 1523–1550), Italian painter of the Renaissance period
- Nanni di Baccio Bigio, 16th century Italian architect

== See also ==
- Bigi
- Biggio
- Bixio
