= Latvia–Taiwan relations =

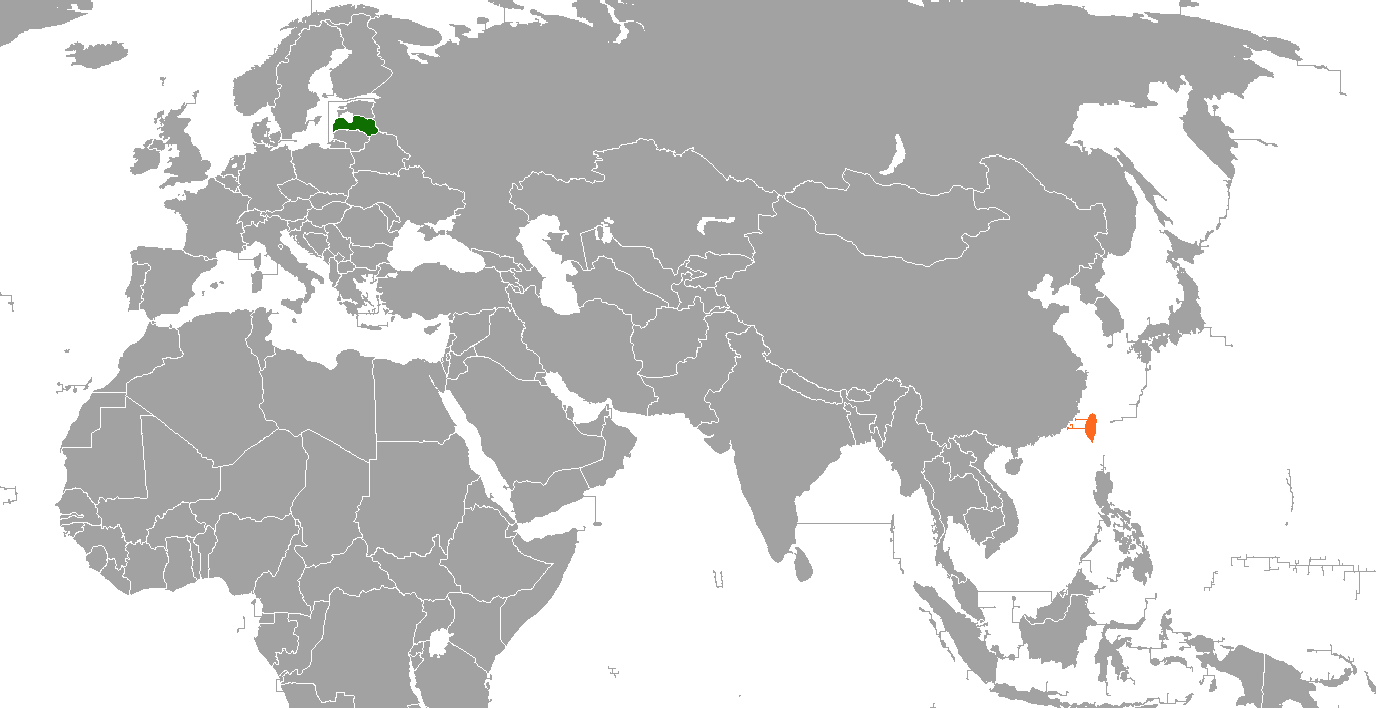

- Latvia: Taiwan

Diplomatic mission
- None: Taipei Mission in the Republic of Latvia

Envoy
- None: Representative Andrew H.C. Lee

Latvia–Taiwan relations refer to the informal ties between Latvia and Taiwan. Despite the absence of official diplomatic relations, both countries maintain economic exchanges and unofficial relations. Taiwanese interests in Latvia are represented by the Taipei Mission in the Republic of Latvia in Riga.

Prior to retreating to Taiwan, the Republic of China (ROC) government established diplomatic relations with Latvia in 1923. In the 1990s, Latvia established formal relations with the People's Republic of China (PRC) and severed official ties with the Taiwanese government.

== History ==
Bilateral relations between the governments of Latvia and the Republic of China (ROC), then based in Nanjing, date back to August 16, 1923, when the ROC recognized Latvia de jure. At the time, the island of Taiwan was under Japanese colonial rule. After the Soviet occupation of Latvia in 1940, the ROC was one of the few countries that did not recognize Latvia's incorporation into the Soviet Union.

After restoring its independence in 1991, Latvia pursued an ambiguous policy towards the issue of China, at one point in 1991 and 1992 briefly establishing relations with both the ROC and the People's Republic of China (PRC), until the PRC froze ties with Latvia in 1992. This policy was allegedly due to Latvian desires of receiving development aid from Taiwan, which did not materialize. This, coupled with changes in the Latvian government and other factors, led to the establishment of full diplomatic ties with the PRC and the closure of the consulate-general of the ROC in Riga in 1994. Since then, Taiwan has been represented by the Taipei Mission in the Republic of Latvia.

In November 2023, Taiwan's Foreign Minister Joseph Wu visited the Baltic States, meeting with the Heads of Foreign Affairs Committees of the Saeima, Riigikogu and Seimas, which had visited Taipei in August, and other public figures. Former Prime Minister of Estonia Andrus Ansip MEP, Vice-chair of the European Parliament's Committee on Foreign Affairs Urmas Paet, Estonian think tank ICDS Director Indrek Kannik and its Latvian counterpart, Latvian Institute of International Affairs Director Kārlis Bukovskis were also a part of the delegation, which met with Taiwanese president Tsai Ing-wen.

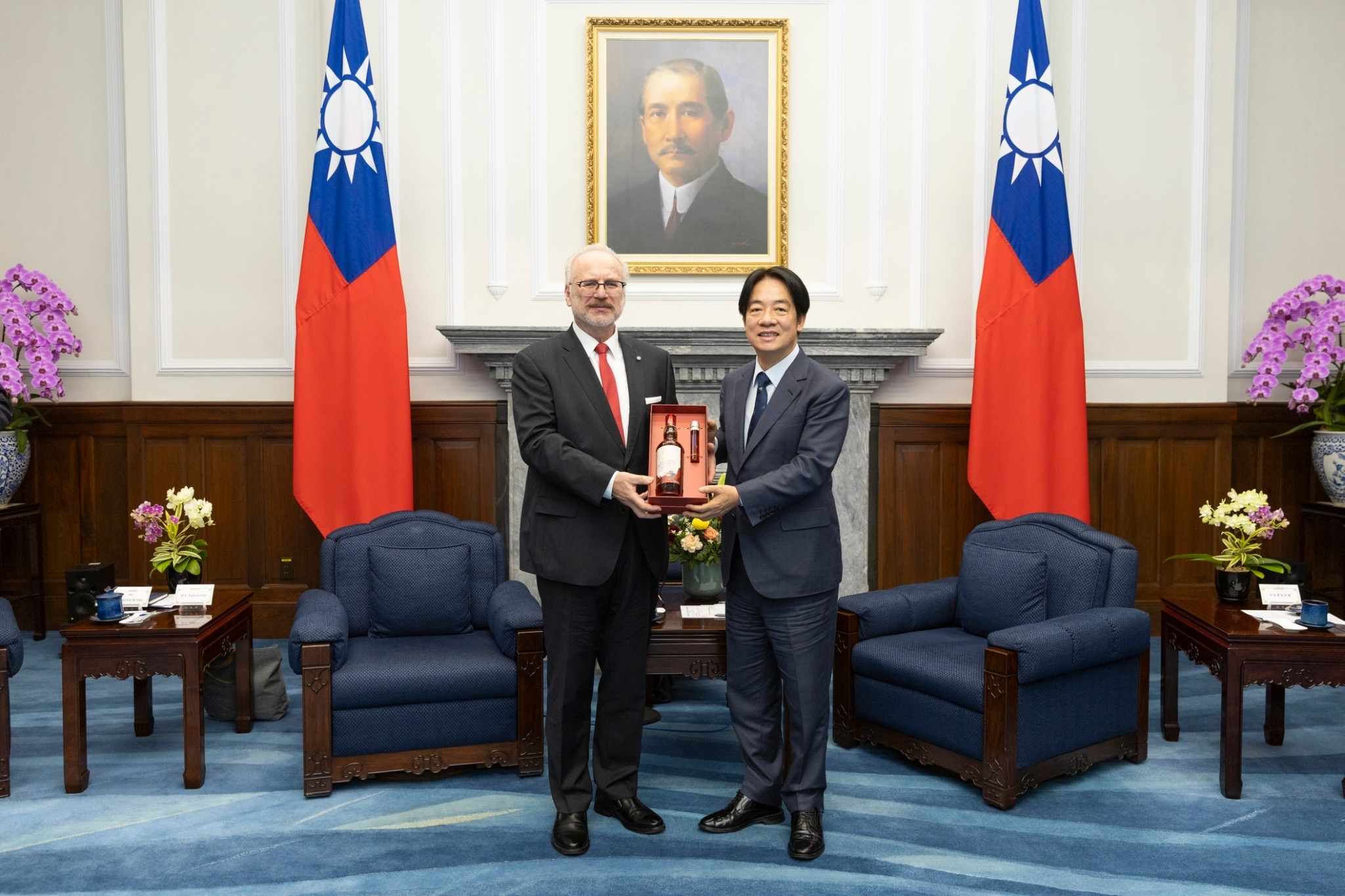
Latvian former president Egils Levits meets Taiwan’s president Lai Ching-te (2024)

After the victory of Lai Ching-te in the 2024 Taiwanese presidential election, the Baltic states, including Latvia, presented a united stance by issuing a joint statement praising Taiwan’s strong democratic system and recognizing it as a model for the Indo-Pacific region and a positive force in global affairs.

In June 2024, former Latvian President and current Special Representative of Latvia for international law and national responsibility, Egils Levits, visited Taiwan as part of a delegation organized by the Atlantic Council, where he met with Taiwanese President Lai Ching-te. The visit underscored Latvia's growing interest in strengthening ties with Taiwan, though its discreet nature suggests a careful diplomatic balancing act in managing relations with China.

Today, bilateral relations include economic ties, a visa-free travel regime and the support of some Latvian parliamentarians towards the participation of Taiwan in organizations such as the World Health Organization.

== Trade ==
In 2022, bilateral trade between Latvia and Taiwan reached approximately $162.3 million, with Latvia exporting around $18.3 million worth of goods to Taiwan and importing about $144 million from Taiwan. The 2022 trade volume marked a slight increase from previous years.

Latvia's primary exports to Taiwan included broadcasting equipment ($2.07M), sawn wood ($1.95M), and wood crates ($1.68M). Conversely, Taiwan mainly exported integrated circuits ($59M), ether ($25.2M), and glass fibers ($5.39M) to Lithuania. Integrated circuits have costantly been the dominant product of Taiwanese exports to Latvia.

== See also ==
- Foreign relations of Latvia
- Foreign relations of Taiwan
