= Bigi =

Bigi may refer to:

== Surname ==
- Emilio Bigi (1910–1969), Paraguayan singer
- Federica Bigi, Sammarinese diplomat and politician
- Ikaros Bigi (born 1947), German theoretical physicist
- Luca Bigi (born 1991), Italian rugby union player

== Other uses ==
- Bigi Jackson (born 2002), son of Michael Jackson
- Palleschi, also known as bigi, partisans of the Medici family in Florence
- Bigi, a village in Nigeria - see List of villages in Bauchi State
- Bigi, a deconsecrated church in Grosseto, Tuscany, Italy

== See also ==
- Bigi Bigi, original Aboriginal name of Abbotsford, New South Wales, Australia
- Bigio
