= Taipei Mission, Riga =

Diplomatic mission of Taiwan in Latvia

Taipei Mission in the Republic of Latvia 駐拉脫維亞臺北代表團 Taipejas Misija Latvijas Republikā
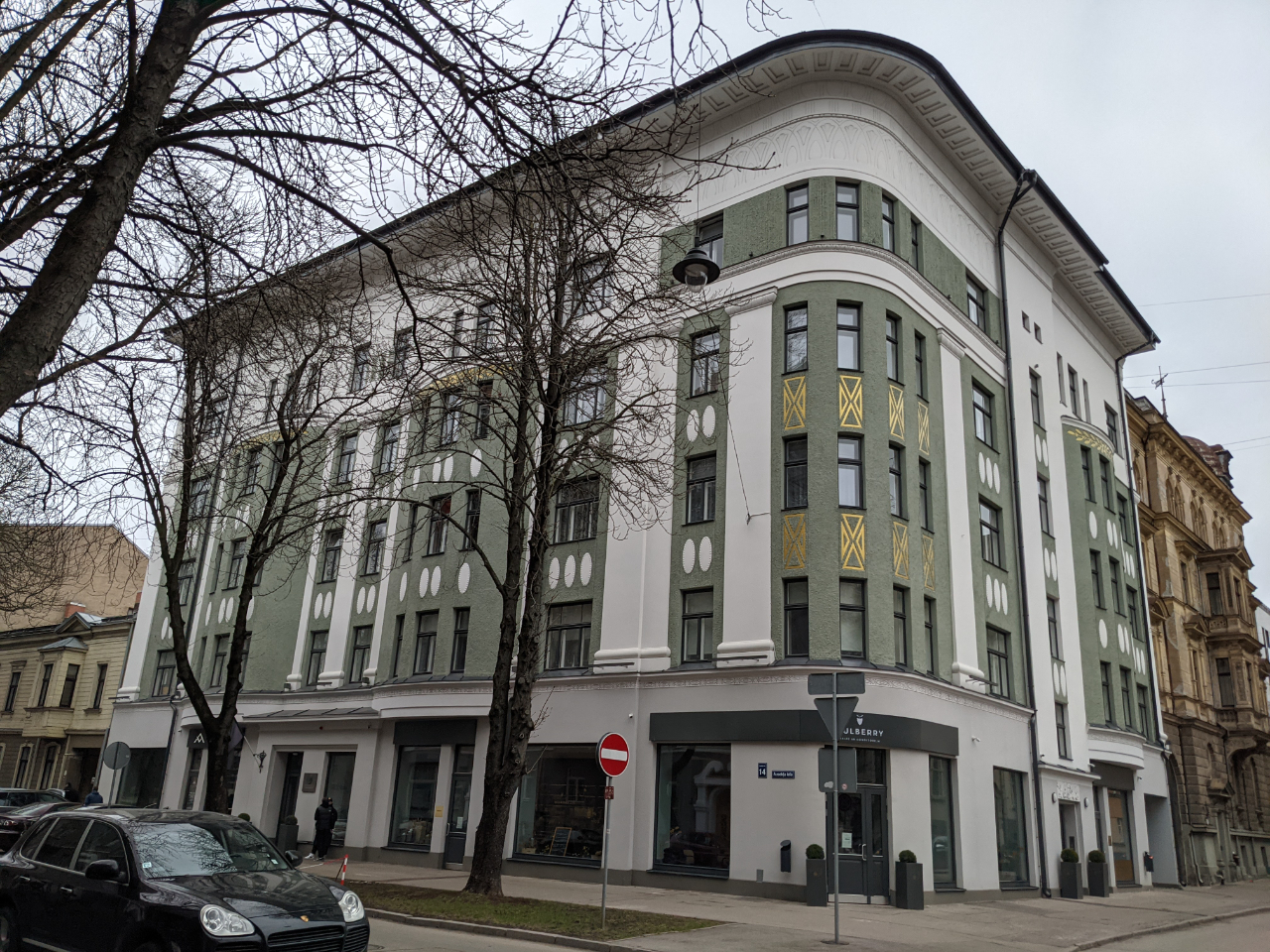

Agency overview
- Formed: January 1992 (as Consulate General of the Republic of China in Riga)
- Jurisdiction: Latvia; Estonia
- Headquarters: Ausekļa iela 14, Central District, Riga, Latvia
- Agency executive: Winston Wen-yi Chen, Representative
- Website: Taipei Mission in the Republic of Latvia

The Taipei Mission in the Republic of Latvia (Chinese: 駐拉脫維亞臺北代表團, Latvian: Taipejas Misija Latvijas Republikā) represents the interests of Taiwan in the Republic of Latvia in the absence of formal diplomatic relations, functioning as a de facto embassy. The Mission is located at Ausekļa iela 14 (14 Auseklis Street) in Riga. It promotes Latvia-Taiwan relations as well as Estonia-Taiwan relations.

== Background ==
The aim of the representative office is to further bilateral cooperation between Latvia and Taiwan in the fields of economics, culture, education and research. In addition, it offers consular services and the consular jurisdiction of the office also extends to Estonia. Till 2021, the consular jurisdiction of the office also extended to Lithuania, until the opening of the Taiwanese Representative Office in Lithuania that same year.

Latvia and the Republic of China exchanged recognition in August 16, 1923, when the it recognized Latvia de jure. After the Soviet occupation of Latvia in 1940, the ROC was one of the countries that did not recognize the incorporation of the Baltic States into the Soviet Union and de facto recognition continued.

On 21 August 1991, Latvia restored its full independence after the end of the Soviet occupation and on November of the same year, Latvia and Taiwan signed an agreement for the 'mutual establishment of trade missions', while at the same time maintaining diplomatic relations with China. On 29 January 1992, Latvia signed an agreement on the opening of a Taiwanese consulate general in the Latvian capital city of Riga (the Consulate General of the Republic of China in Riga). This policy was allegedly due to Latvian desires of receiving development aid from Taiwan, which, however, did not materialize. In response, China withdrew its ambassador and diplomatic staff from Latvia and froze relations between Latvia. On 17 September 1992, a 25-member delegation headed by Latvian Prime Minister Ivars Godmanis and Foreign Minister of Latvia Jānis Jurkāns made an official visit to Taiwan. During the delegation's visit, Latvia and Taiwan signed agreement for investment-protection and a letter of intent to establish direct flights between the capital cities of Taipei and Riga.

After a new Latvian government under Valdis Birkavs came to power following the 1993 parliamentary election, the Taiwanese consulate general in Riga was closed and Latvia normalized its relations with the People's Republic of China in 1994 due to Latvia receiving very little investment from Taiwan and the conducting of a much larger trade with China. In November 1995, the consulate general was downgraded to the Taipei Mission and in October 1996, it began its operations.

Since March 2022, the office is headed by a representative, currently Andrew H.C. Lee, who previously served as the representative of Taipei Economic and Cultural Office in Brunei.

== See also ==
- Latvia–Taiwan relations
- List of diplomatic missions of Taiwan
- List of diplomatic missions in Latvia
