= Maria Serenius =

Finnish diplomat

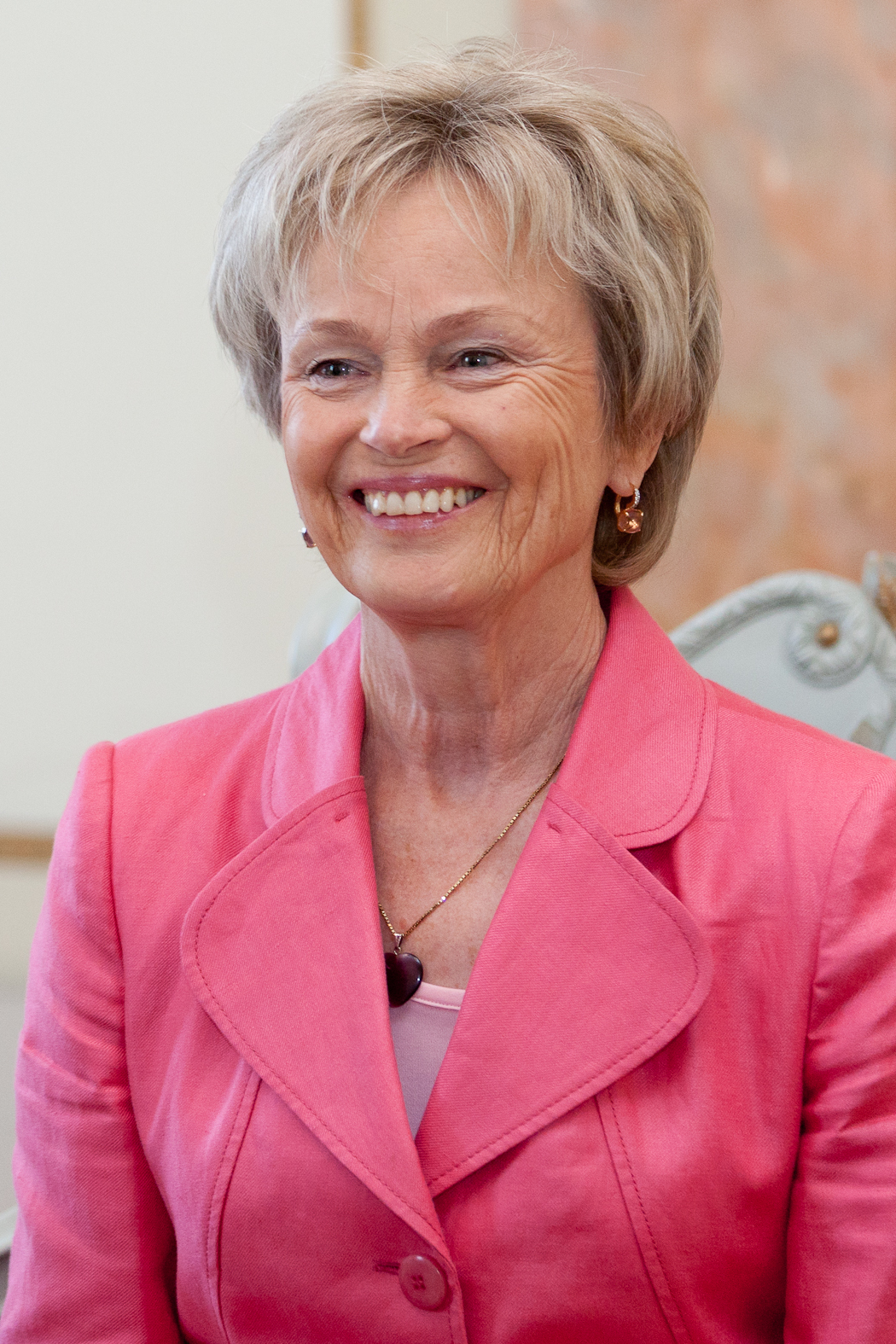
Maria Serenius in 2012

Maria Serenius is a Finnish diplomat. She was the Finnish Ambassador to Riga, from September 1, 2008, and retired in autumn 2012. She started at the Ministry for Foreign Affairs in 1975.

Before joining Riga, Serenius worked in Egypt, Japan, Sri Lanka and Switzerland. Between 1997 and 2001, she was the Consul General of Finland in Los Angeles.

She has also worked at the Ministry of Foreign Affairs as Head of Department at Africa and the Middle East before moving to Turkey in 2004 as Ambassador to Ankara.
