= Bixio Celio =

Swiss ice hockey player

- Born: June 6, 1928; Quinto, Switzerland
- Died: April 11, 1983 (aged 54); Faido, Switzerland
- Position: Right Wing
- Shot: Right
- National team: Switzerland
- Playing career: 1951–1961

Bixio Celio (June 6, 1928 – April 11, 1983) was a Swiss ice hockey player who competed for the Swiss national team at the 1952 Winter Olympics.
