= Bixio Music Group =

US company

Bixio Music Group, a New York corporation, is the American branch of Gruppo Editoriale Bixio, or Bixio Publishing Group, the first Italian music publishing company. The Bixio Publishing Group, based in Rome, Italy, was established in Naples during the 1920s by composer Cesare Andrea Bixio. Bixio Music Group, an ASCAP member since 1992, was established to facilitate licensing of the Bixio Publishing Group catalogue that includes not only musical compositions but also sound recordings by related labels under the Group in the territories of North and South America.

The UNEMIA, an organization representing over sixty of the most important and authoritative publishing houses in Italy, states on its website that Gruppo Editoriale Bixio comprises Bixio CEMSA S.r.l., Bixio SAM S.r.l., Edizioni Musicali Nido S.r.l., Gale Italiana S.r.l., Granadine Music S.r.l., Stero Oceania S.r.l., Bixio Cesare Andrea S.r.l., and Grandi Firme Della Canzone S.r.l.

Bixio Publishing Group owns record Cinevox Records and Bubble Records. Cinevox Records was created by Cesare Andrea Bixio in the early 1960s, to specialize in the release of film scores. Cinevox released its first soundtrack in 1966, for the film The Poppy Is Also a Flower, by film composer Georges Auric. Throughout the years Cinevox has been responsible for creating and releasing all 600 of Bixio Publishing Groups' original soundtrack albums which span across genres including spaghetti westerns, horror, comedy and romance. Bubble Records was founded in 1980 and managed by it:Franco Bixio and it:Carlo Andrea Bixio, sons of Cesare Andrea Bixio. Bubble Records expanded the reach of the Publishing Group into the sphere of international pop music, producing artists such as Keith Emerson and Donovan. The Bubble Records phonographs were published by Edizioni Italiana Gale also owned by the Bixio Publishing Group. Bubbles' own roster of artists included Giuni Russo, Eugenio Bennato, I Camaleonti and Tony Esposito to name a few. Musikstrasse is another label controlled by Bixio Publishing Group, active in the genre of classical music.
