= Respirator diplomacy of Taiwan =

Bilateral diplomatic relations

Respirator diplomacy of Taiwan refers to the exchange of masks between Taiwan and other countries, aimed to help during the COVID-19 pandemic.

== Background ==
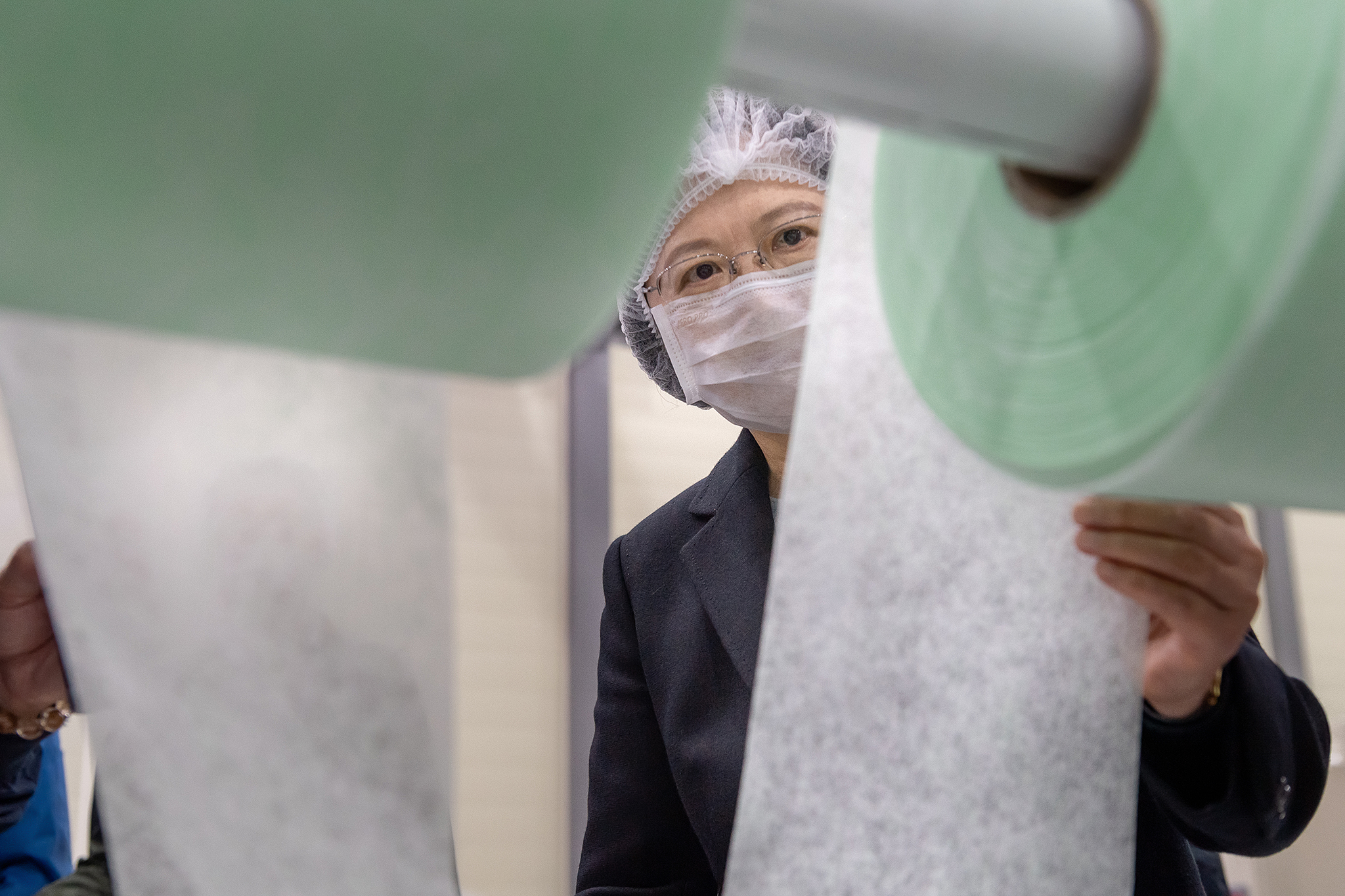
The President of Taiwan, Tsai Ing-wen, visits a mask factory.

After the outbreak of COVID-19, the global demand for face masks increased rapidly. By the end of January 2020, the Taiwanese Government pushed out a series of decisions on masks, included export restrictions, compulsory appropriation and investments, to allow Taiwan to become the second largest mask exporter globally. By March 2020, Taiwan successfully increased its production of face masks from 1.88 million to 10 million units per day, carried out rationing, and became one of the largest markets for imports second only to mainland China. In the middle of May, face mask production has increased to 20 million units per day.

It also launched a hospital ship through the Pacific, providing ventilators and masks to nations unable to obtain medical support from other sources, like Palau.

In July 2021, Taiwan donated 150,000 masks to the Brazilian state of Goiás.

== Diplomatic endowment ==
On 1 April 2020, President Tsai Ing-wen announced that Taiwan would donate 10 million masks to countries severely affected by the pandemic, including America and Europe, along with any other nation that has established full diplomatic relations with Taiwan.

According to the Taiwanese Foreign Ministry, as of July 2021, more than 54 million masks had been donated to over 80 countries since early 2020.

== Reactions ==
=== Reactions from the European Union ===
The President of the European Commission, Ursula von der Leyen, sent a message on Twitter to thank Taiwan for the contributions it made.

Avatar of Ursula von der Leyen

Ursula von der Leyen
(@vonderleyen)
tweeted:

The European Union thanks Taiwan for its donation of 5.6 million masks to help fight the #coronavirus. We really appreciate this gesture of solidarity. This global virus outbreak requires international solidarity & cooperation. Acts like this show that we are #StrongerTogether.

Apr 1, 2020

=== Reactions from the United States ===
- On 21 April 2020, U.S. Senator from Massachusetts Elizabeth Warren tweeted that she was "grateful for Taiwan's generous donations to Massachusetts to help fight COVID-19."
- On 5 May 2020, U.S. Senator from Colorado Cory Gardner tweeted his thanks to President Tsai Ing-wen and further called for Taiwan to be immediately allowed to join the WHO.
- On 12 May 2020, Tennessee governor Bill Lee tweeted to thank Taiwan for its contribution of 100,000 medical masks.
- On 14 May 2020, U.S. Congressman from Oklahoma Kevin Hern, touting Oklahoma's relationship with Taiwan, tweeted to thank Taiwan for donating 100,000 medical masks to the state.

== See also ==
- Medical diplomacy
