= List of diplomatic missions in Latvia =

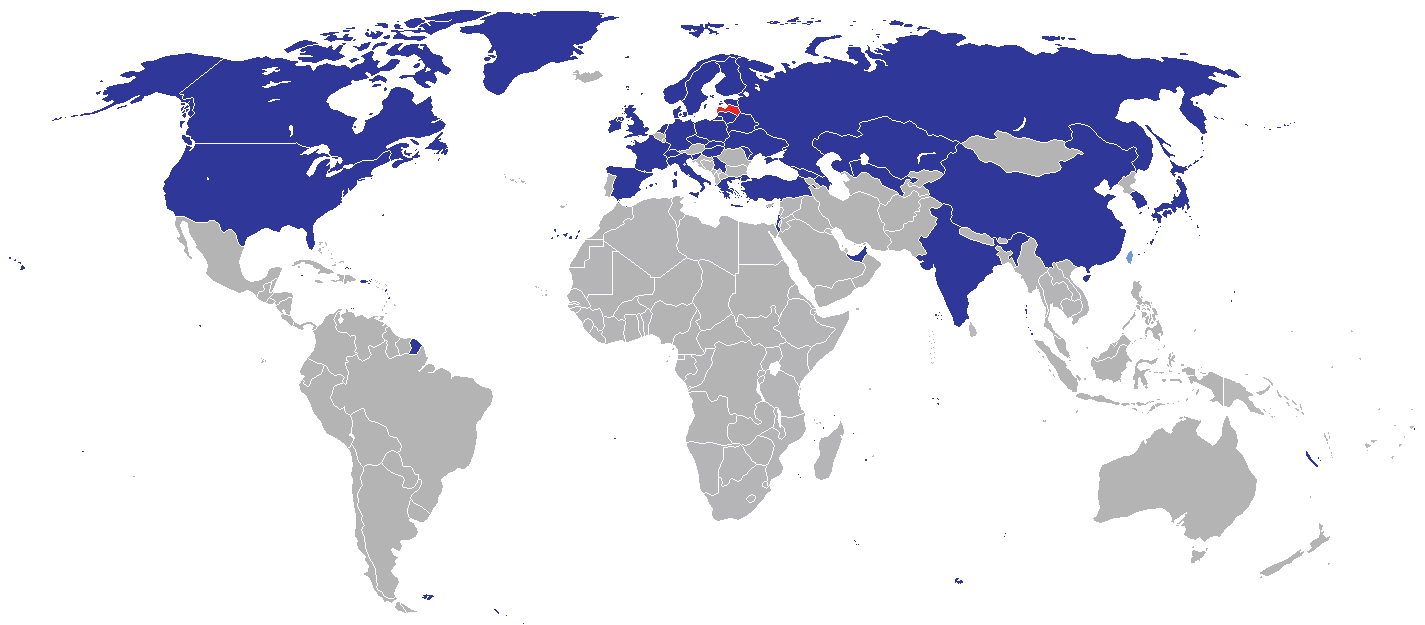
Map of diplomatic missions in Latvia

This article lists diplomatic missions resident in Latvia. At present, the capital city of Riga hosts 40 embassies. Several other countries have ambassadors accredited to Latvia, with most being resident in Stockholm, Berlin, Stockholm, Warsaw or other Nordic capitals.

In late-November 2006, Riga hosted the 19th NATO Summit, significantly boosting the diplomatic profile of the country.

== Diplomatic missions in Riga ==
Country	Mission type	Photo
Azerbaijan	Embassy	
Belarus	Embassy	-
Canada	Embassy	
China	Embassy	
Czechia	Embassy	
Denmark	Embassy	
Estonia	Embassy	
Finland	Embassy	
France	Embassy	
Georgia	Embassy	
Germany	Embassy	
Greece	Embassy	
Hungary	Embassy	
India	Embassy	
Ireland	Embassy	
Israel	Embassy	-
Italy	Embassy	
Japan	Embassy	-
Kazakhstan	Embassy	
Lithuania	Embassy	
Moldova	Embassy	
Netherlands	Embassy	-
Norway	Embassy	
Poland	Embassy	
Russia	Embassy	
Serbia	Embassy	
Slovakia	Embassy	
Slovenia	Embassy	-
South Korea	Embassy	
Sovereign Military Order of Malta	Embassy	
Spain	Embassy	
Sweden	Embassy	
Switzerland	Embassy	
Taiwan	Representative Office	
Turkey	Embassy	
Ukraine	Embassy	
United Arab Emirates	Embassy	
United Kingdom	Embassy	
United States	Embassy	
Uzbekistan	Embassy	

== Consulates in Latvia ==
Country	Mission type	City	Photo
Belarus	Consulate-General	Daugavpils	

== Non-resident embassies accredited to Latvia ==
=== Resident in Berlin, Germany ===
1. Bahrain
2. Burkina Faso
3. Burundi
4. Ecuador
5. Ethiopia
6. Ghana
7. Guinea
8. Kuwait
9. Mali
10. Mauritania
11. Niger
12. Panama
13. Paraguay
14. Togo

=== Resident in Copenhagen, Denmark ===
1. Bosnia and Herzegovina
2. Nepal
3. Uganda

=== Resident in Helsinki, Finland ===
1. Argentina
2. Cuba
3. Iceland
4. Malaysia
5. Namibia
6. Palestine
7. Peru
8. Saudi Arabia
9. Uruguay

=== Resident in London, United Kingdom ===
1. Belize
2. Guyana
3. Oman

=== Resident in Minsk, Belarus ===
1. Kyrgyzstan
2. Syria
3. Tajikistan
4. Turkmenistan

=== Resident in Moscow, Russia ===
1. Chad
2. Congo-Brazzaville
3. Gabon
4. Myanmar

=== Resident in Stockholm, Sweden ===
1. Australia
2. Belgium
3. Botswana
4. Brazil
5. Chile
6. Croatia
7. Cyprus
8. Dominican Republic
9. Egypt
10. El Salvador
11. Indonesia
12. Iran
13. Kenya
14. Kosovo
15. Laos
16. Libya
17. Mexico
18. Morocco
19. North Korea
20. Philippines
21. South Africa
22. Sri Lanka
23. Sudan
24. Tanzania
25. Thailand
26. Vietnam
27. Zambia
28. Zimbabwe

=== Resident in Vilnius, Lithuania ===
1. Armenia
2. Holy See
3. Nigeria

=== Resident in Warsaw, Poland ===
1. Afghanistan
2. Albania
3. Algeria
4. Angola
5. Bangladesh
6. Bulgaria
7. Colombia
8. Guatemala
9. Iraq
10. Lebanon
11. Luxembourg
12. Mongolia
13. Montenegro
14. New Zealand
15. Pakistan
16. Qatar
17. Senegal
18. Tunisia

=== Resident elsewhere ===
1. Andorra (Andorra la Vella)
2. Austria (Vienna)
3. Cambodia (Sofia)
4. Honduras (Brussels)
5. Jordan (The Hague)
6. Eswatini (New York City)
7. Malta (Valletta)
8. North Macedonia (Prague)
9. Rwanda (The Hague)
10. San Marino (City of San Marino)

== Closed missions ==
- Austria
  - Riga (Embassy) — closed in August 2016
- Belgium
  - Riga (Embassy) — closed in 2015 (Note: Resident in Stockholm, Sweden)
- Portugal
  - Riga (Embassy) — closed in 2012
- Russia
  - Daugavpils (Consulate-General) — closed in 2022
  - Liepāja (Consulate-General) — closed in 2022

== See also ==
- Foreign relations of Latvia
- List of diplomatic missions of Latvia
