= Mohammed Ahmed Al Mahmood =

'Mohammed Ahmed Al Mahmood' (Arabic: محمد أحمد المحمود, born 30 December 1950 in Al Ain, UAE) was the extraordinary and authorized ambassador of the United Arab Emirates to the Federal Republic of Germany from 2004 until 2012, when he was succeeded by Juma Mubarak Al Junaibi.

== Biography ==
Mohammed Ahmed Al Mahmood was born 30 December 1950 in Al Ain, United Arab Emirates. He is married and has 7 children.

=== Education ===
In 1975 Mahmood received a diploma in politics, economic and international relations from Oxford University in the United Kingdom. He received a senior leadership diploma from Harvard University (United States) in 2003.

=== Qualifications ===
In 1973 Mahmood entered the Ministry of Foreign Affairs and has occupied several positions. Between 1978 and 1987 he transferred to the department of protocol and hospitality at the presidential office and was promoted to the rank of assistant undersecretary.

Between 1987 and 1993 he served as extraordinary and authorized ambassador to the Islamic Republic of Pakistan non-resident ambassador to Mauritius. From 1993 to 2001 he served as extraordinary and authorized Ambassador to the Arab Republic of Egypt and permanent delegate at the Arab League (Non-resident Ambassador to Kenya, Nigeria and Ghana).

Between 2001 and 2004 he served as assistant undersecretary for technical affairs in the ministry of foreign affairs. In 2004 he was promoted to the rank of Undersecretary and since 2004 has been acting as extraordinary and authorized ambassador to the Federal Republic of Germany and non-resident ambassador to Latvia, Lithuania, Estonia and Croatia).

=== Orders ===
Mahmood received the Order of Merit in the rank of officer from France and the order of the Pakistani star for the Islamic Republic of Pakistan
