= List of diplomatic missions of Latvia =

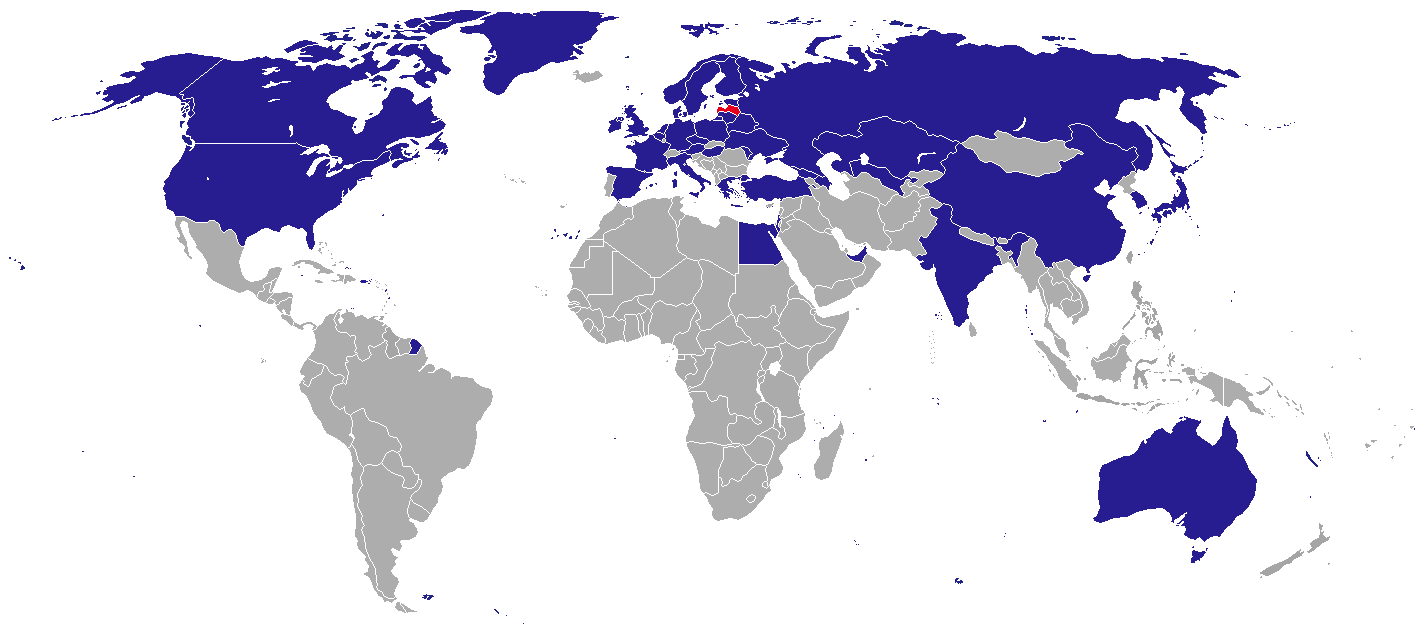
Countries with Latvian diplomatic missions

The Republic of Latvia has a modest network of embassies and consulates around the world. The Latvian Ministry of Foreign Affairs oversees the maintenance of these missions.

Latvia and the other Baltic states, together with the Nordic countries have signed a memorandum of understanding on the posting of diplomats at each other's missions abroad, under the auspices of Nordic-Baltic Eight.

Honorary consulates and overseas offices of the Investment and Development Agency of Latvia are excluded from this listing.

== Current missions ==
=== Africa ===
Host country	Host city	Mission	Concurrent accreditation	Ref.
Egypt	Cairo	Embassy	Countries: Jordan; Kenya; International Organizations: Arab League (Note: Accredited as an observer mission.)	

=== Americas ===
Host country	Host city	Mission	Concurrent accreditation	Ref.
Canada	Ottawa	Embassy	Countries: Cuba	
United States	Washington, D.C.	Embassy	International Organizations: Organization of American States	

=== Asia ===
Host country	Host city	Mission	Concurrent accreditation	Ref.
Azerbaijan	Baku	Embassy		
China	Beijing	Embassy	Countries: Thailand	
Georgia	Tbilisi	Embassy	Countries: Armenia	
India	New Delhi	Embassy	Countries: Sri Lanka	
Israel	Tel Aviv	Embassy		
Japan	Tokyo	Embassy		
Kazakhstan	Astana	Embassy	Countries: Kyrgyzstan	
South Korea	Seoul	Embassy	Countries: Singapore	
Turkey	Ankara	Embassy		
United Arab Emirates	Abu Dhabi	Embassy	Countries: Kuwait; Saudi Arabia	
Uzbekistan	Tashkent	Embassy	Countries: Tajikistan; Turkmenistan	

=== Europe ===
Host country	Host city	Mission	Concurrent accreditation	Ref.
Austria	Vienna	Embassy	Countries: Liechtenstein; Slovakia; Switzerland	
Belarus	Minsk	Embassy		
Belarus	Vitebsk	Consulate		
Belgium	Brussels	Embassy	Countries: Luxembourg	
Czech Republic	Prague	Embassy	Countries: Bosnia and Herzegovina	
Denmark	Copenhagen	Embassy		
Estonia	Tallinn	Embassy		
Finland	Helsinki	Embassy		
France	Paris	Embassy	Countries: Monaco	
Germany	Berlin	Embassy		
Greece	Athens	Embassy	Countries: Cyprus; Serbia	
Hungary	Budapest	Embassy	Countries: Croatia; Montenegro; Slovenia	
Ireland	Dublin	Embassy	Countries: Portugal	
Italy	Rome	Embassy	Countries: Albania; Malta; San Marino; International Organizations: Food and Agriculture Organization	
Lithuania	Vilnius	Embassy		
Moldova	Chișinău	Embassy		
Netherlands	The Hague	Embassy	International Organizations: OPCW	
Norway	Oslo	Embassy	Countries: Iceland	
Poland	Warsaw	Embassy	Countries: Bulgaria; Romania	
Russia	Moscow	Embassy		
Spain	Madrid	Embassy	Countries: Andorra	
Sweden	Stockholm	Embassy		
Ukraine	Kyiv	Embassy		
United Kingdom	London	Embassy		

=== Oceania ===
Host country	Host city	Mission	Concurrent accreditation	Ref.
Australia	Canberra	Embassy	Countries: New Zealand	

=== Multilateral organizations ===
Organization	Host city	Host country	Mission	Concurrent accreditation	Ref.
Council of Europe	Strasbourg	France	Permanent Mission		
European Union	Brussels	Belgium	Permanent Mission		
NATO	Brussels	Belgium	Permanent Delegation		
OECD	Paris	France	Permanent Delegation	International Organizations: UNESCO	
United Nations	New York City	United States	Permanent Mission	Countries: Guatemala	
United Nations	Geneva	Switzerland	Permanent Mission	International Organizations: Conference on Disarmament; World Health Organization; World Trade Organization	
United Nations	Vienna	Austria	Permanent Mission	International Organizations: OSCE; United Nations Office on Drugs and Crime	

== Gallery ==
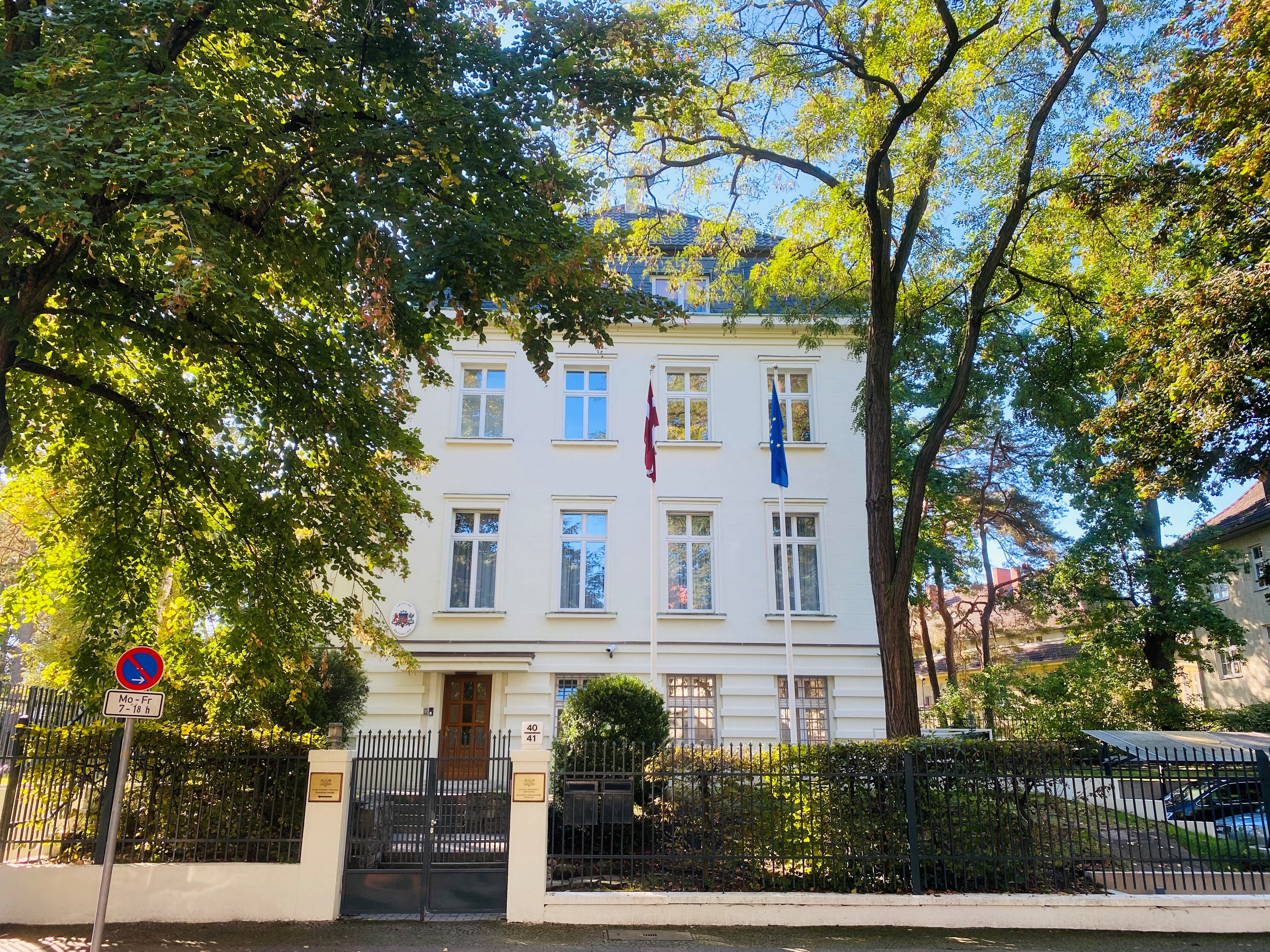
Embassy in Berlin

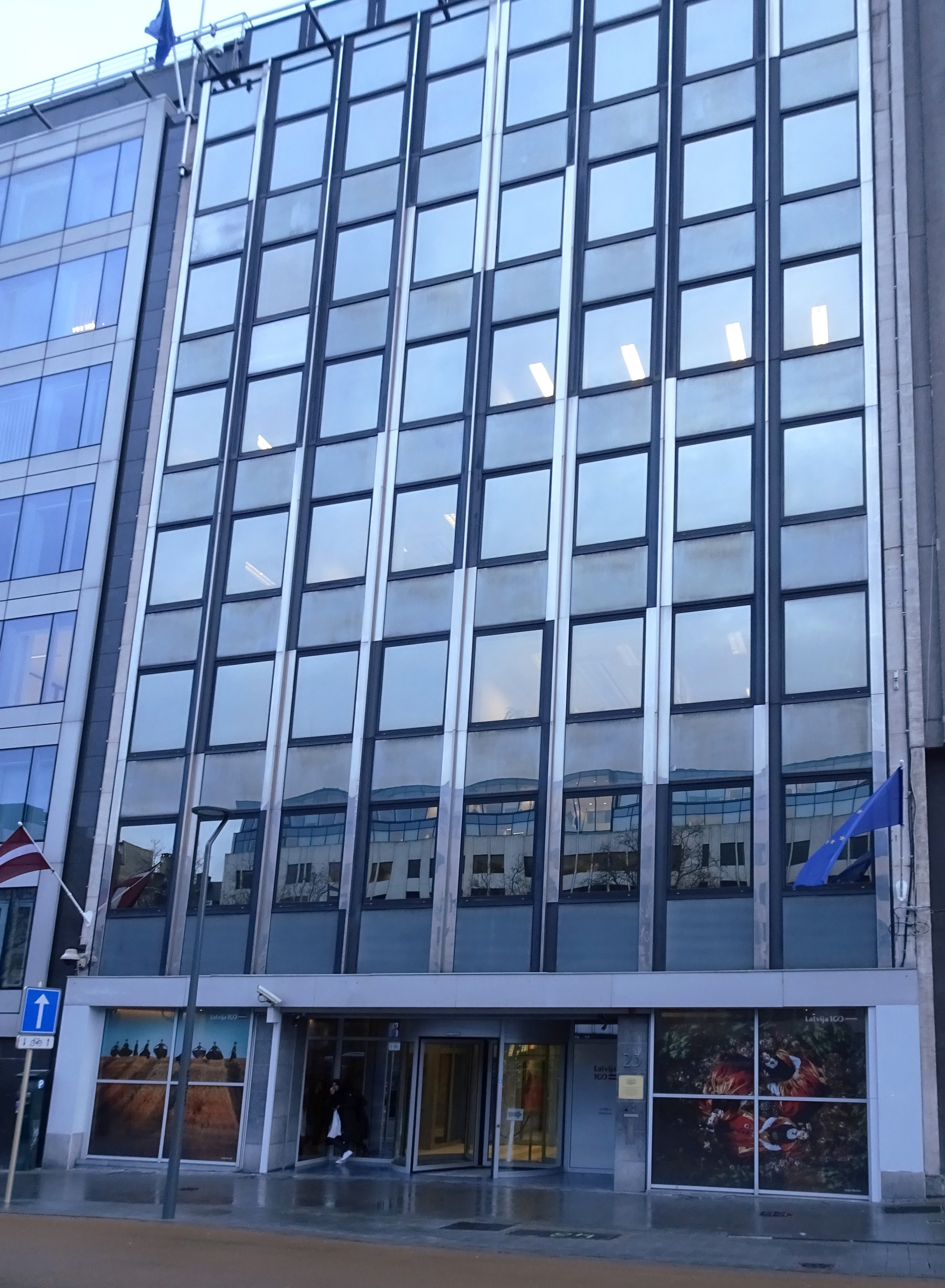
Embassy in Brussels

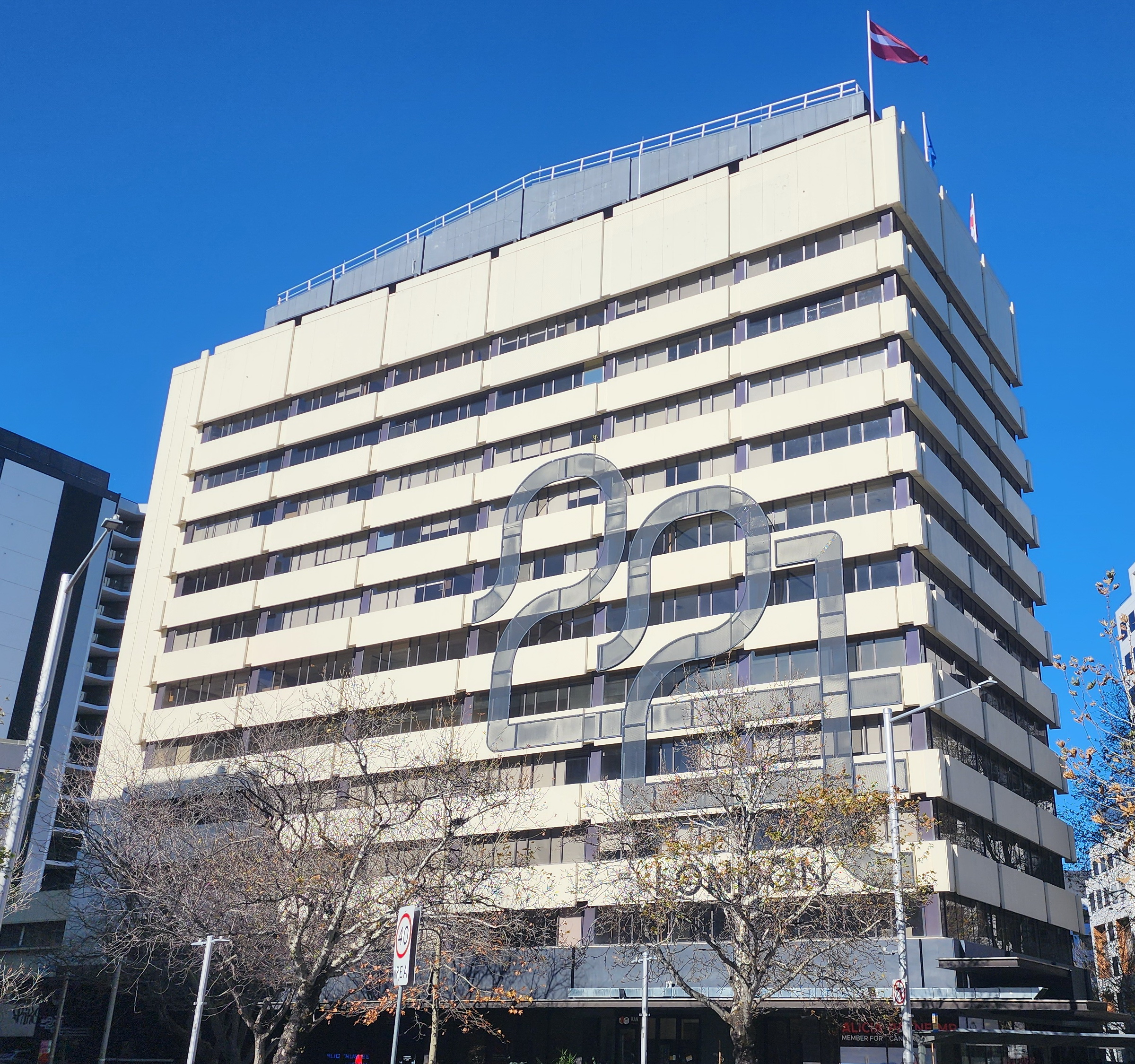
Embassy in Canberra

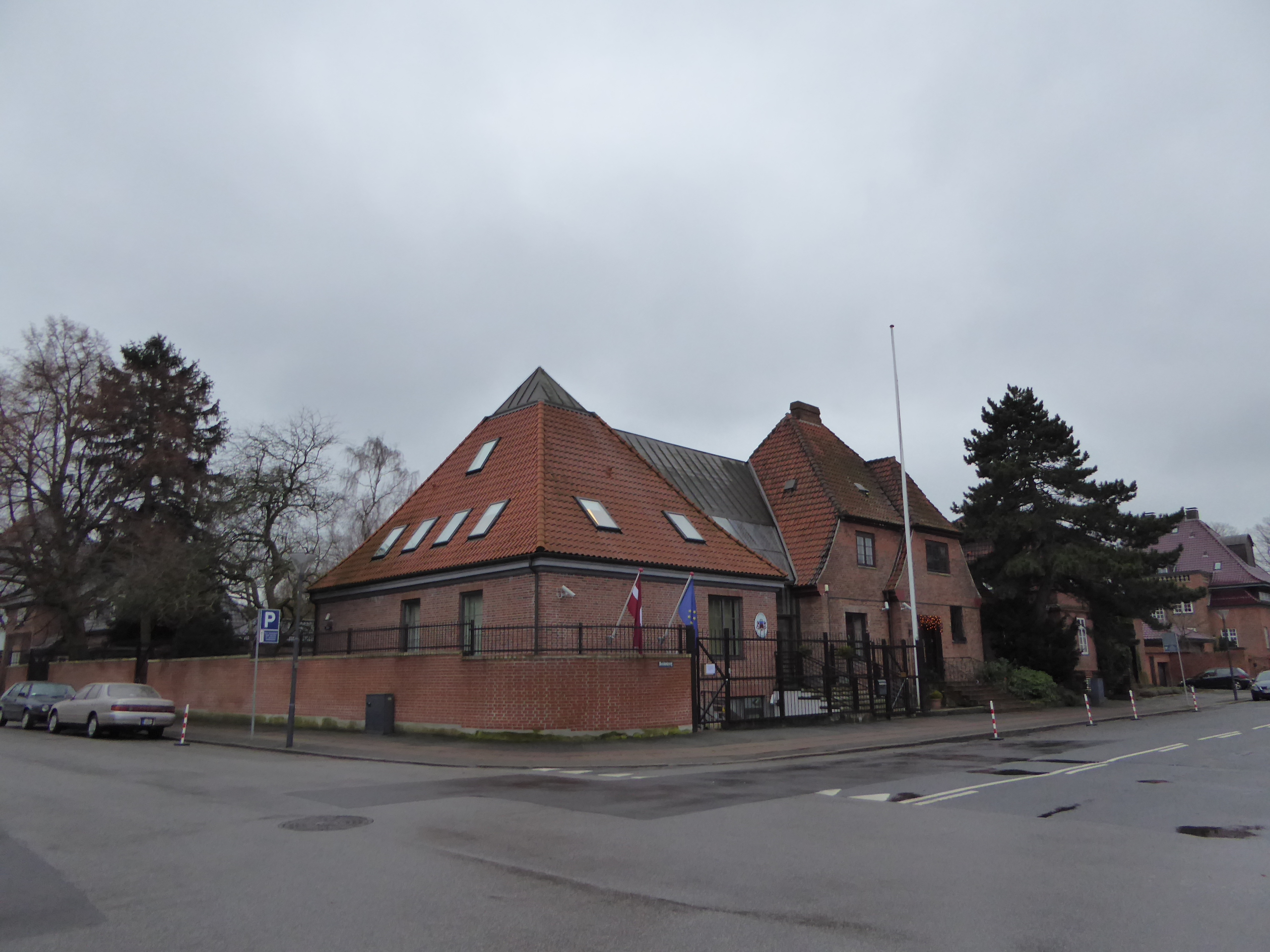
Embassy in Copenhagen

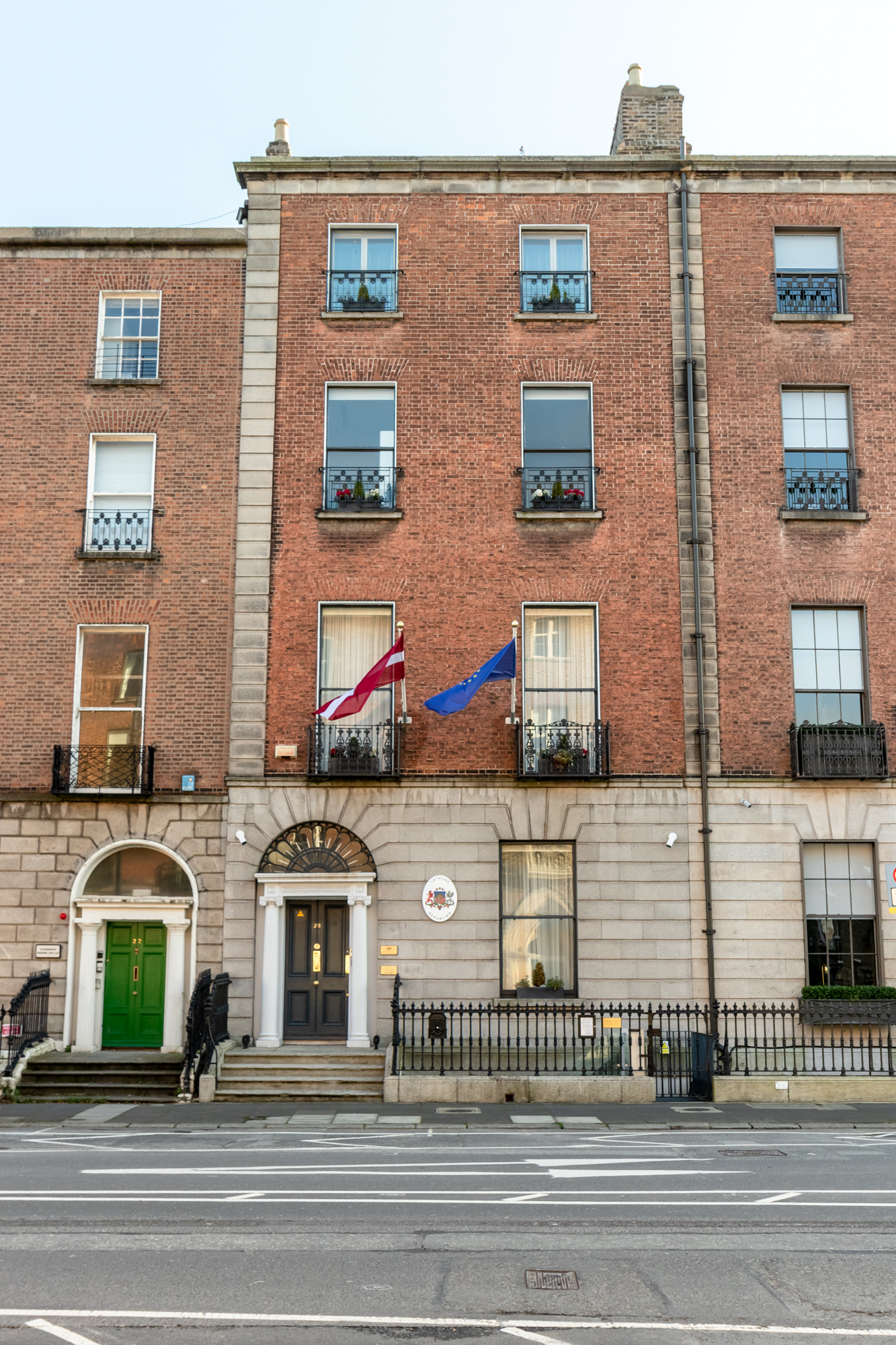
Embassy in Dublin

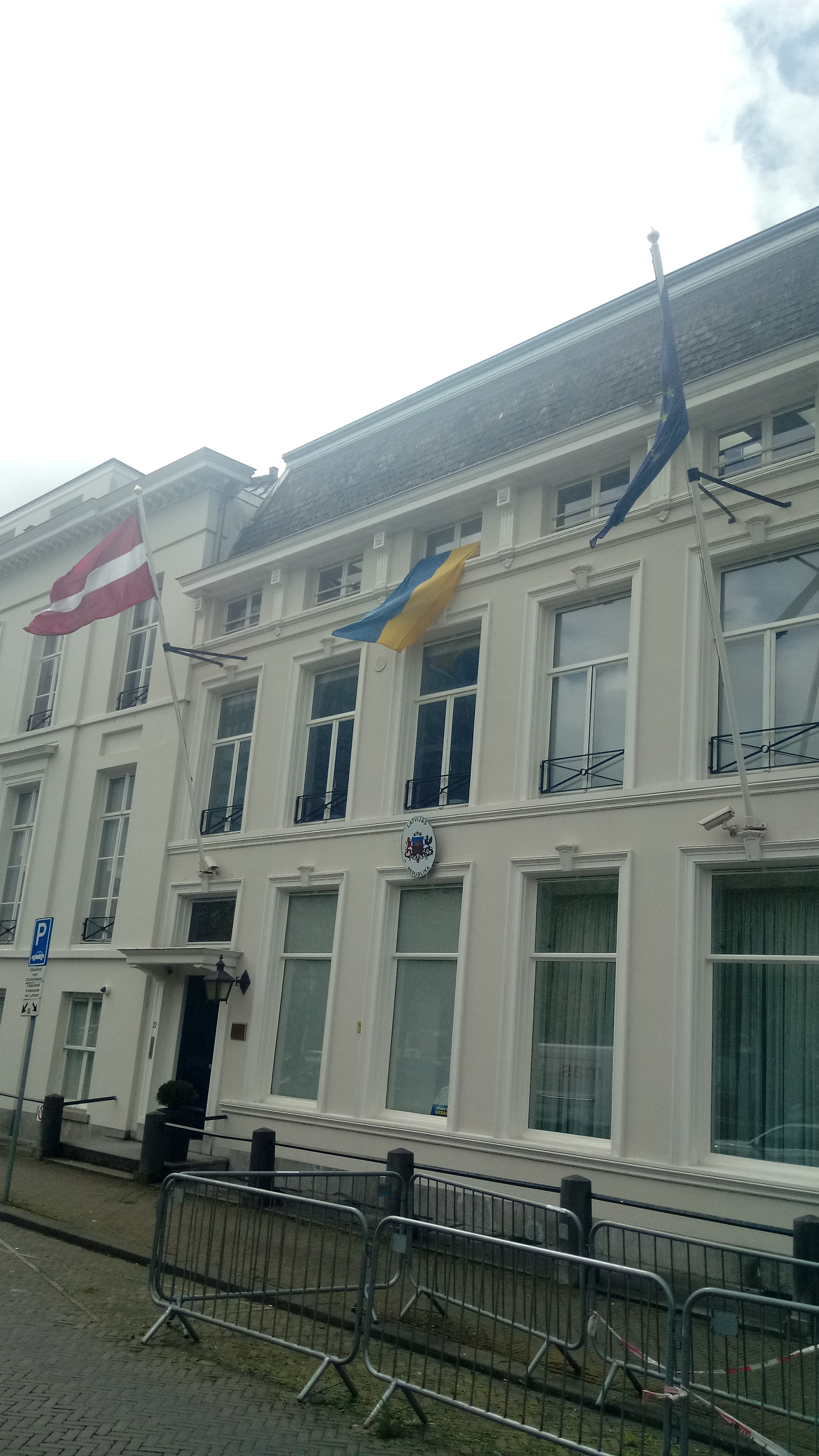
Embassy in The Hague

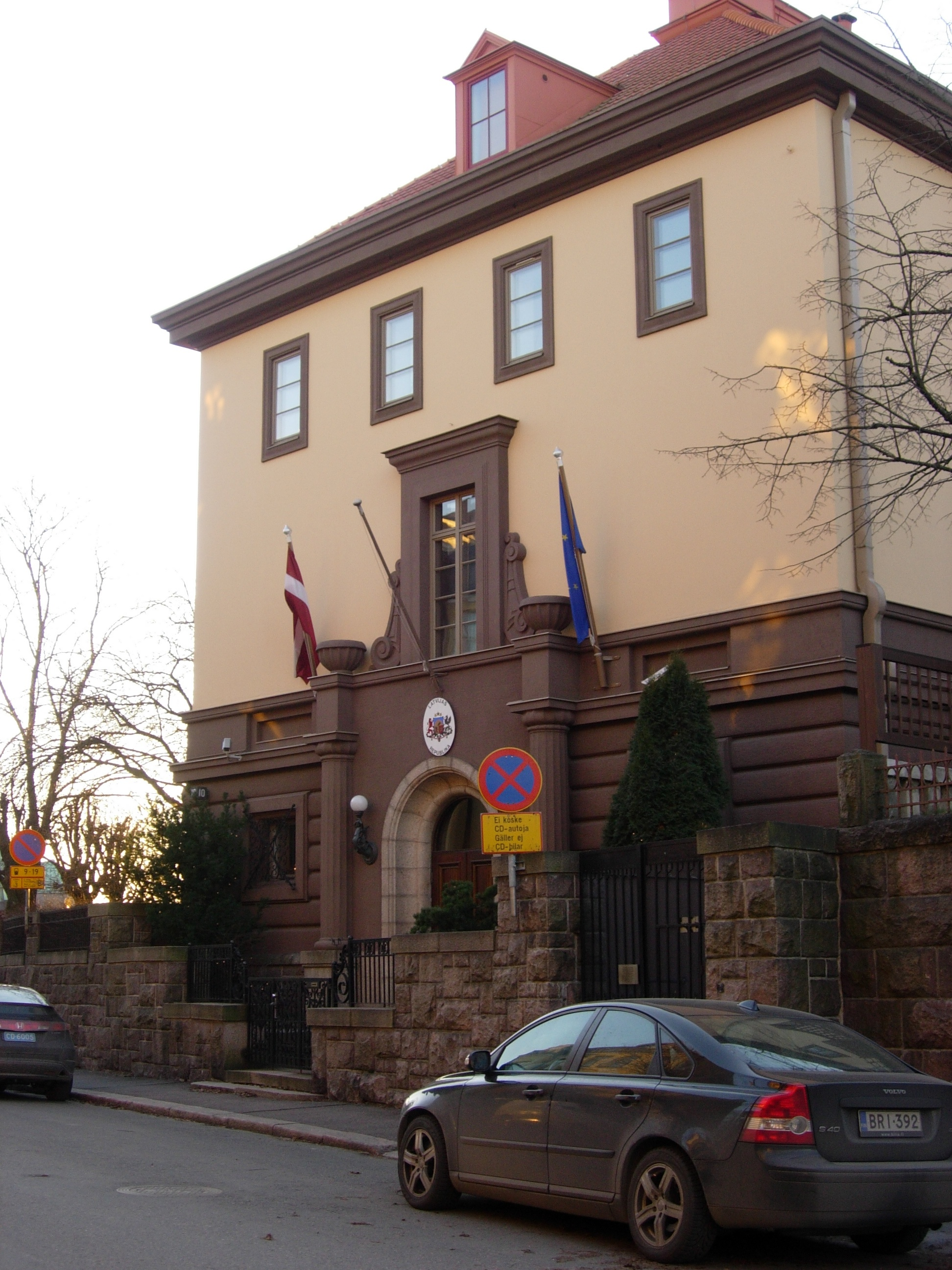
Embassy in Helsinki

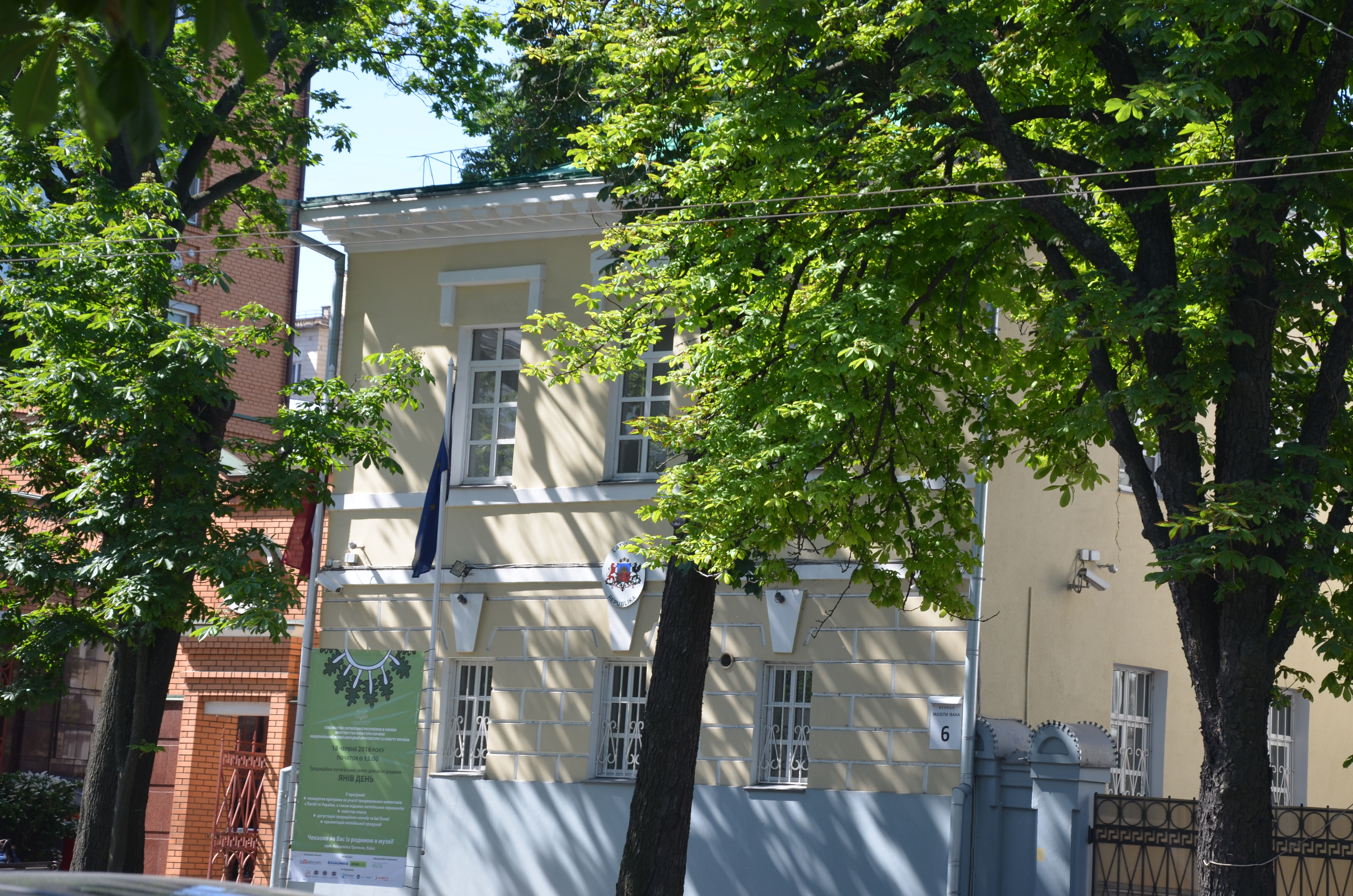
Embassy in Kyiv

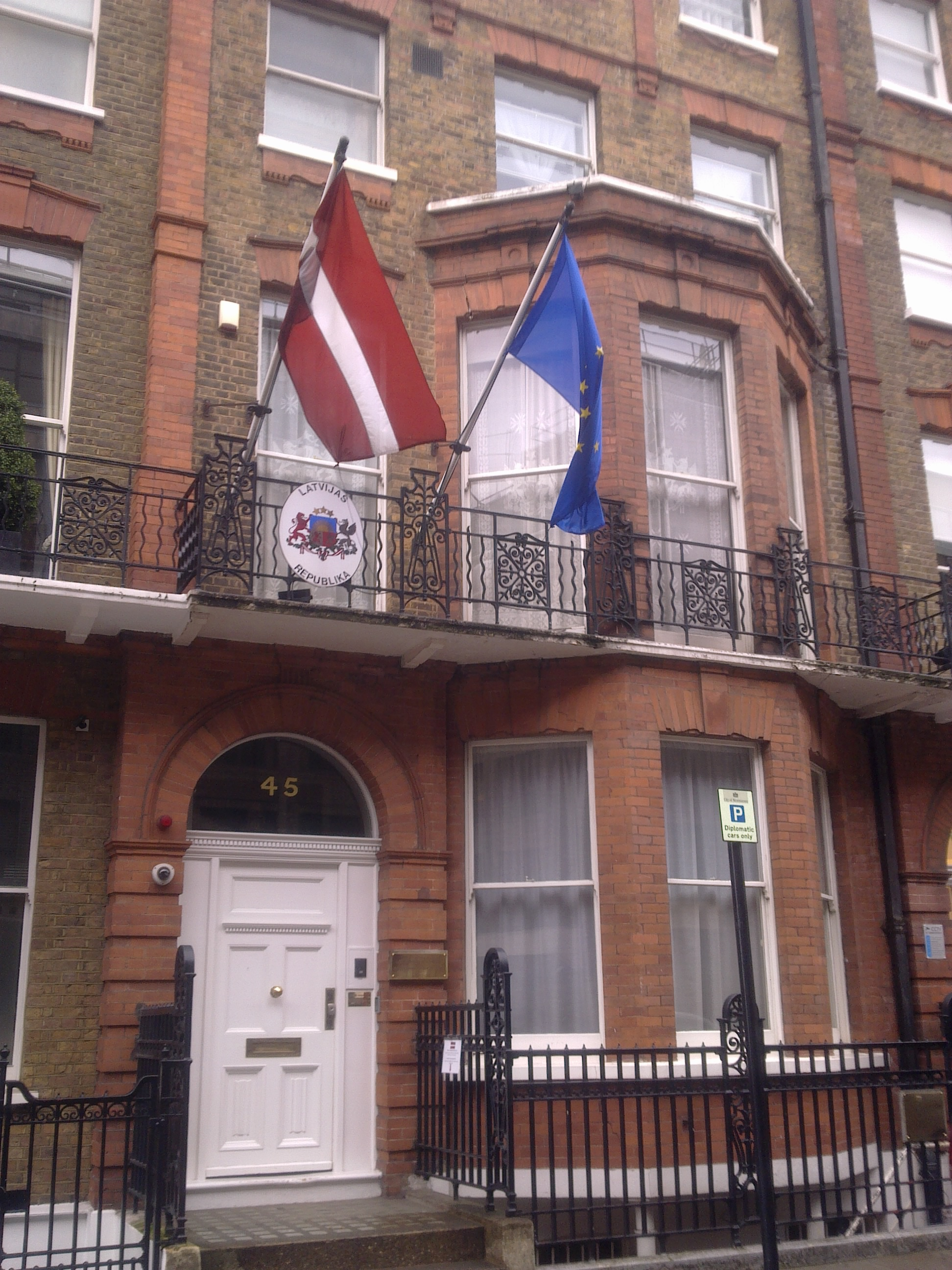
Embassy in London

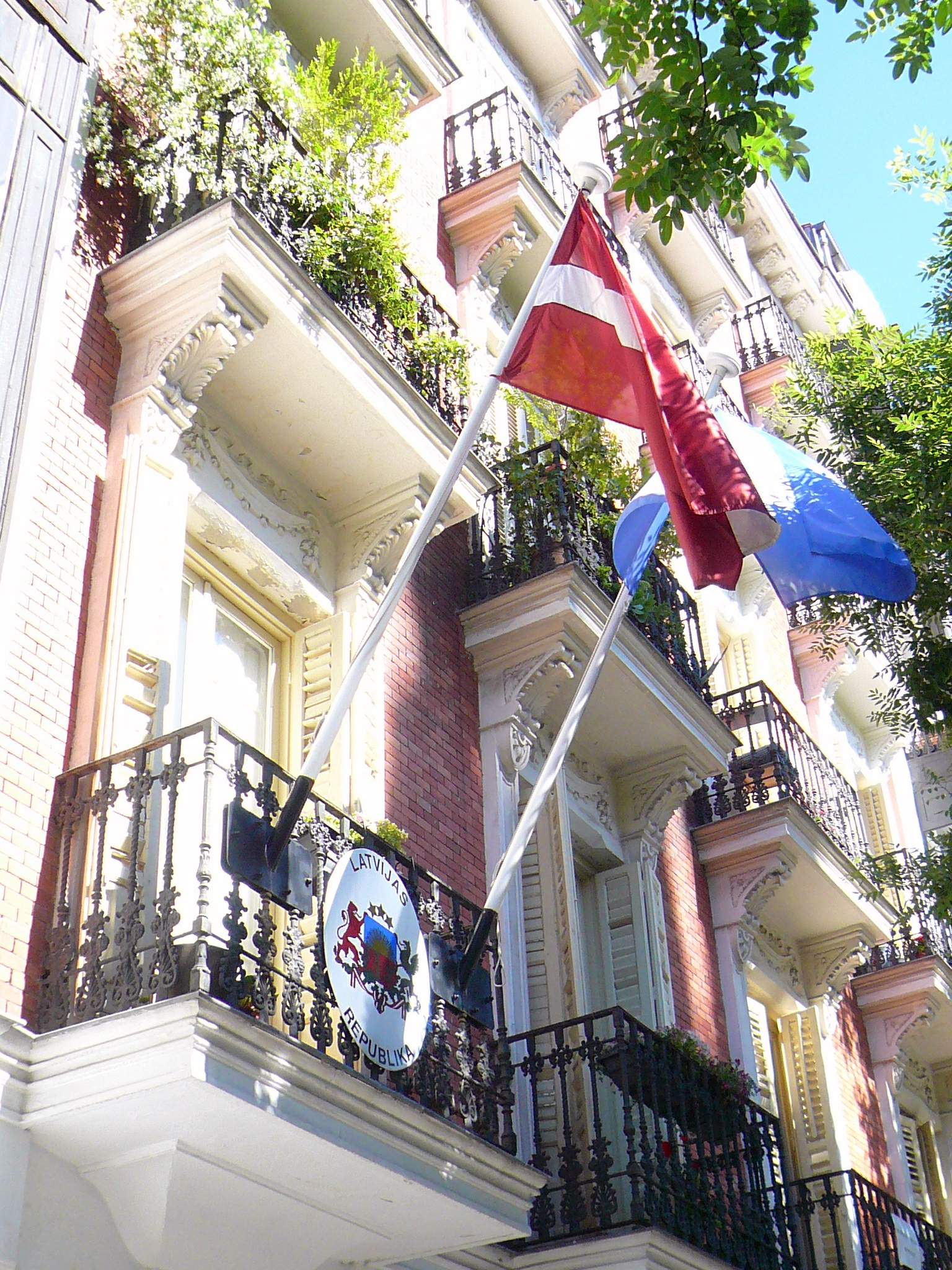
Embassy in Madrid

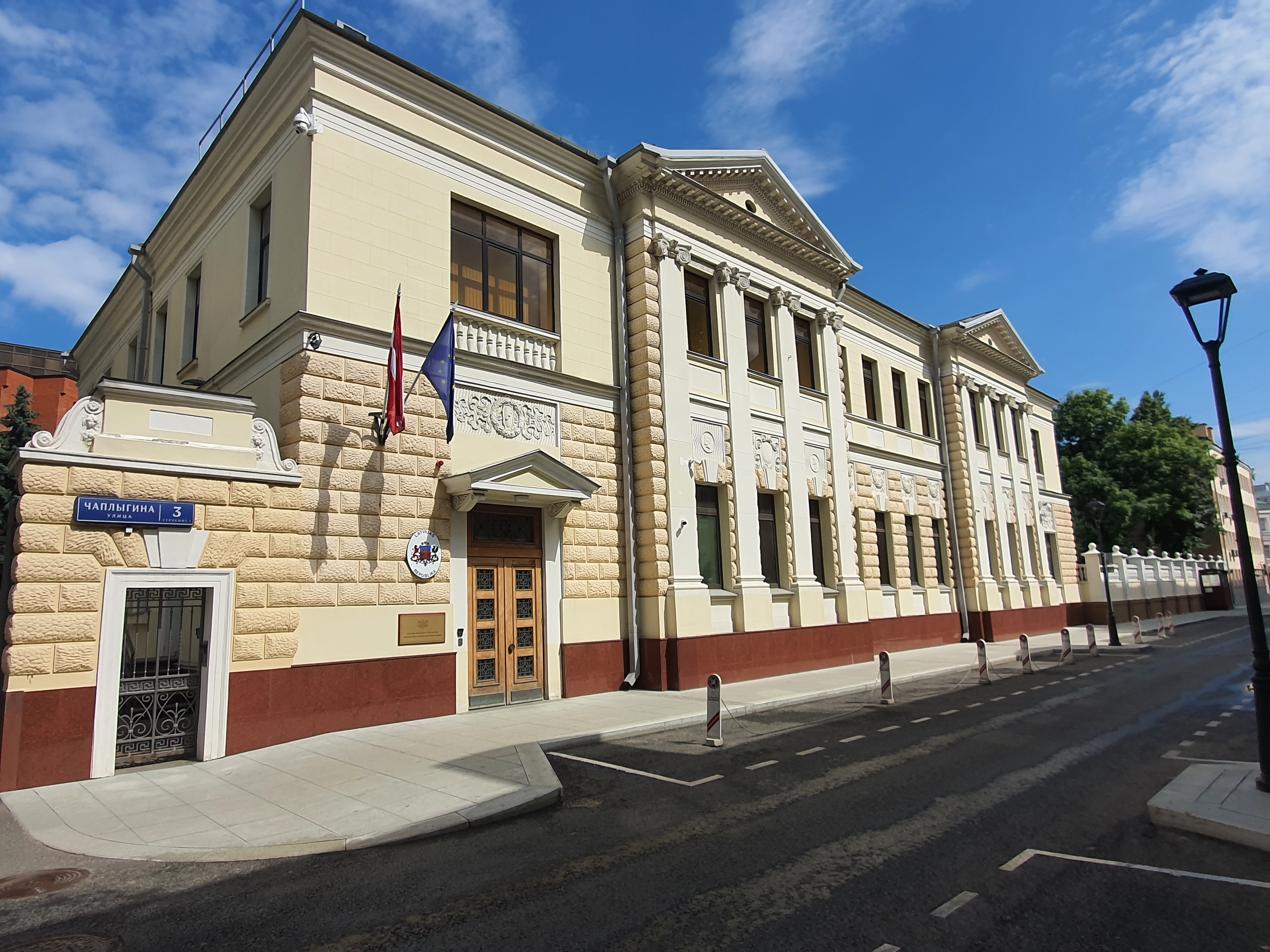
Embassy in Moscow

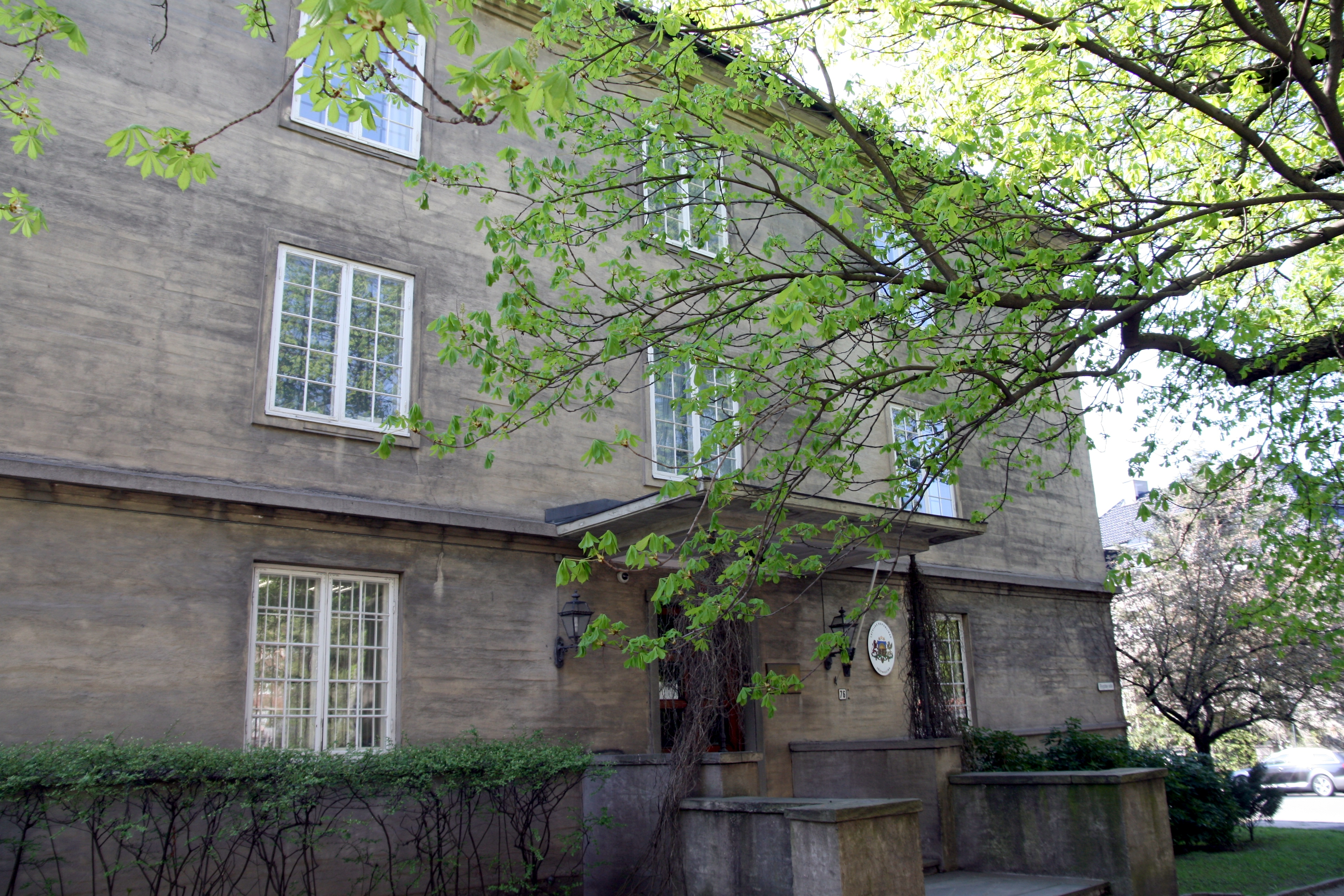
Embassy in Oslo

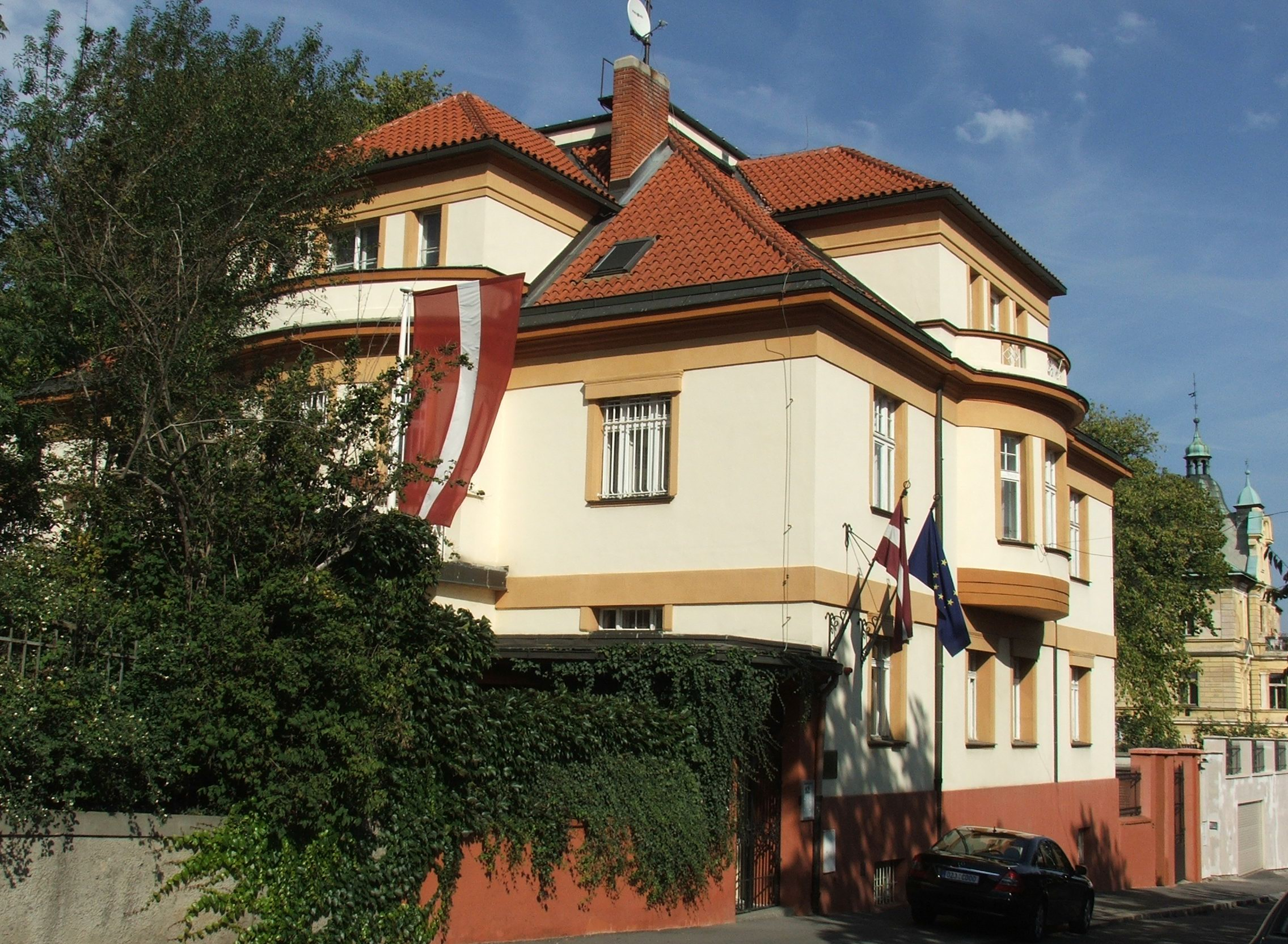
Embassy in Prague

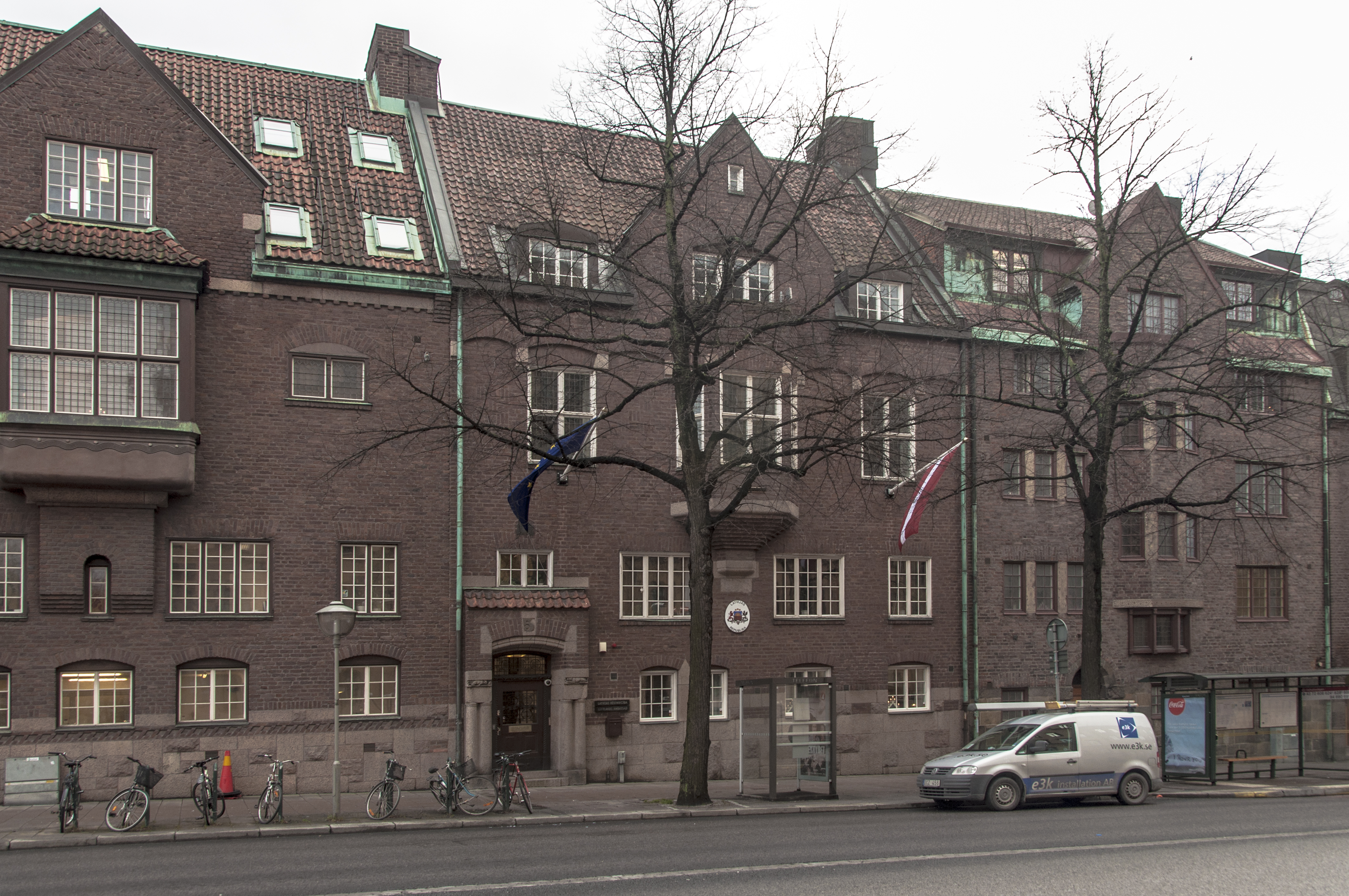
Embassy in Stockholm

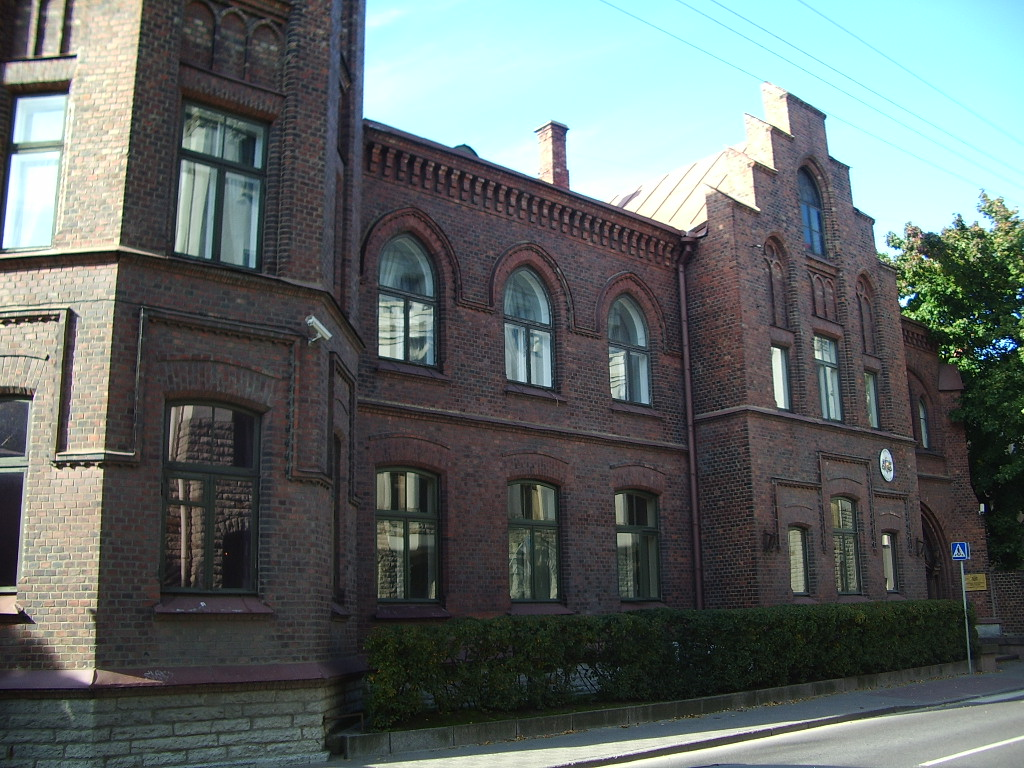
Embassy in Tallinn

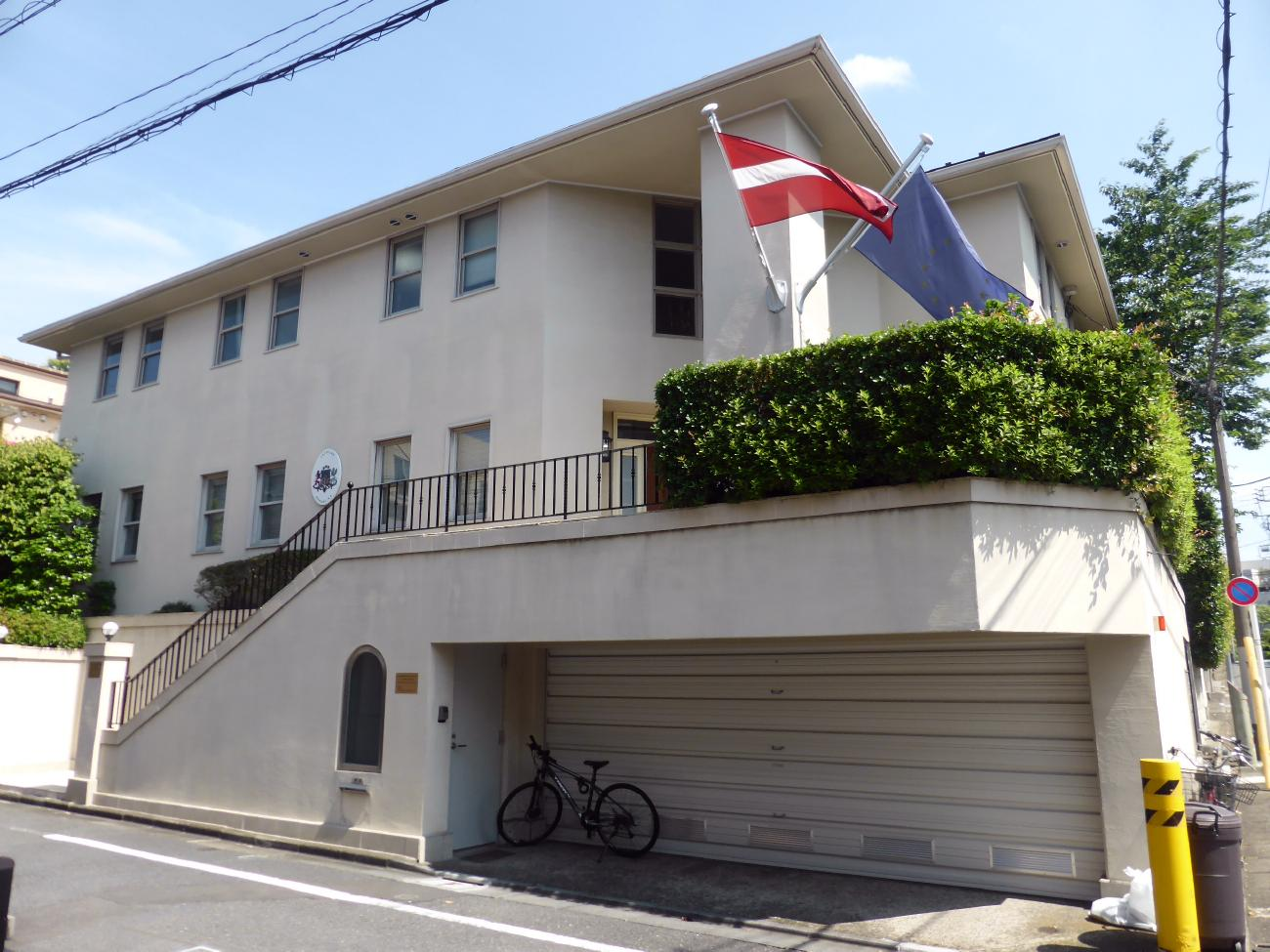
Embassy in Tokyo

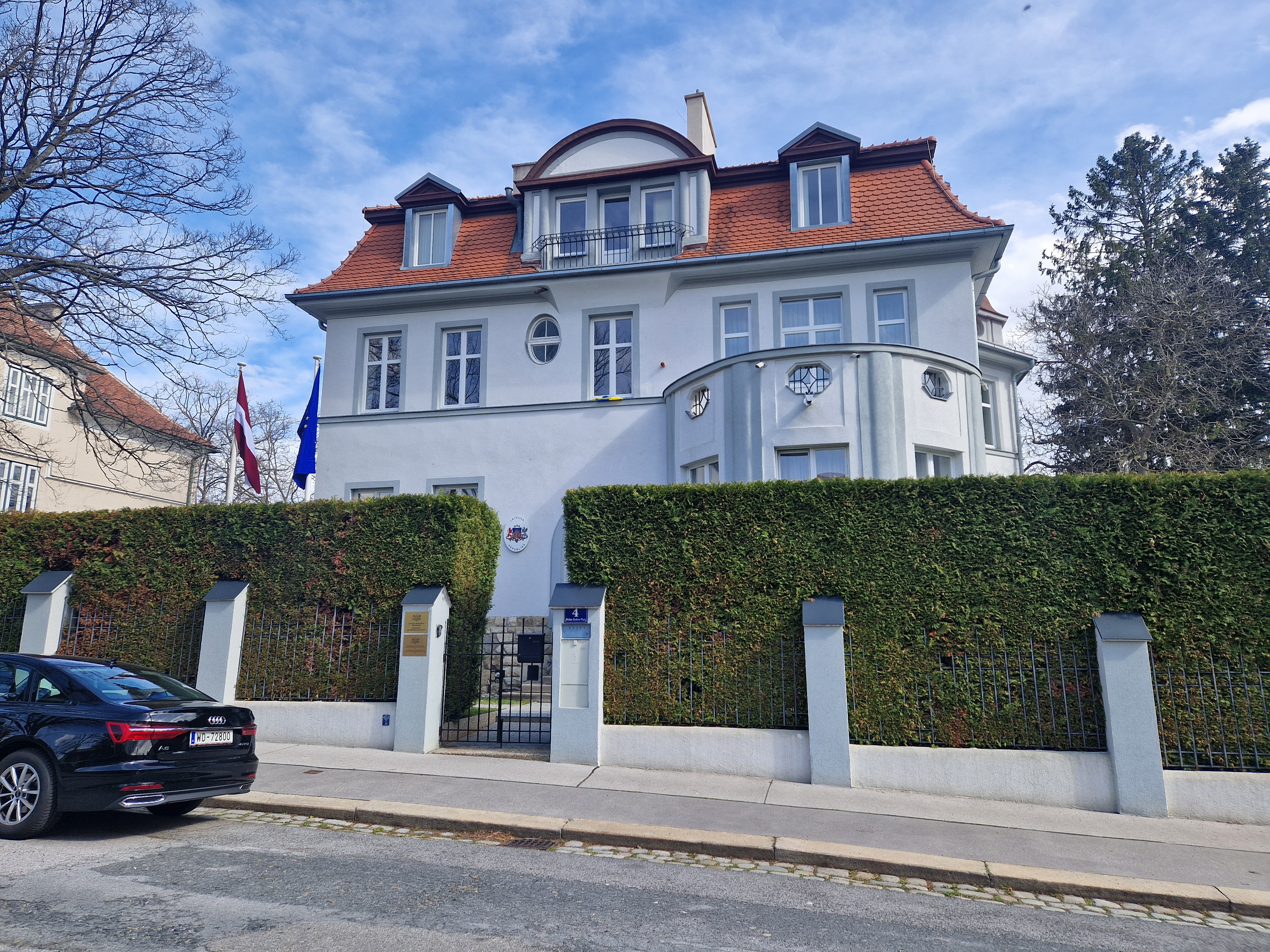
Embassy in Vienna

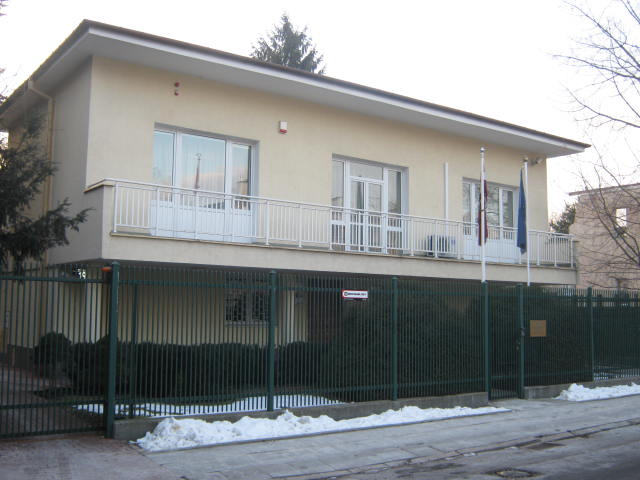
Embassy in Warsaw

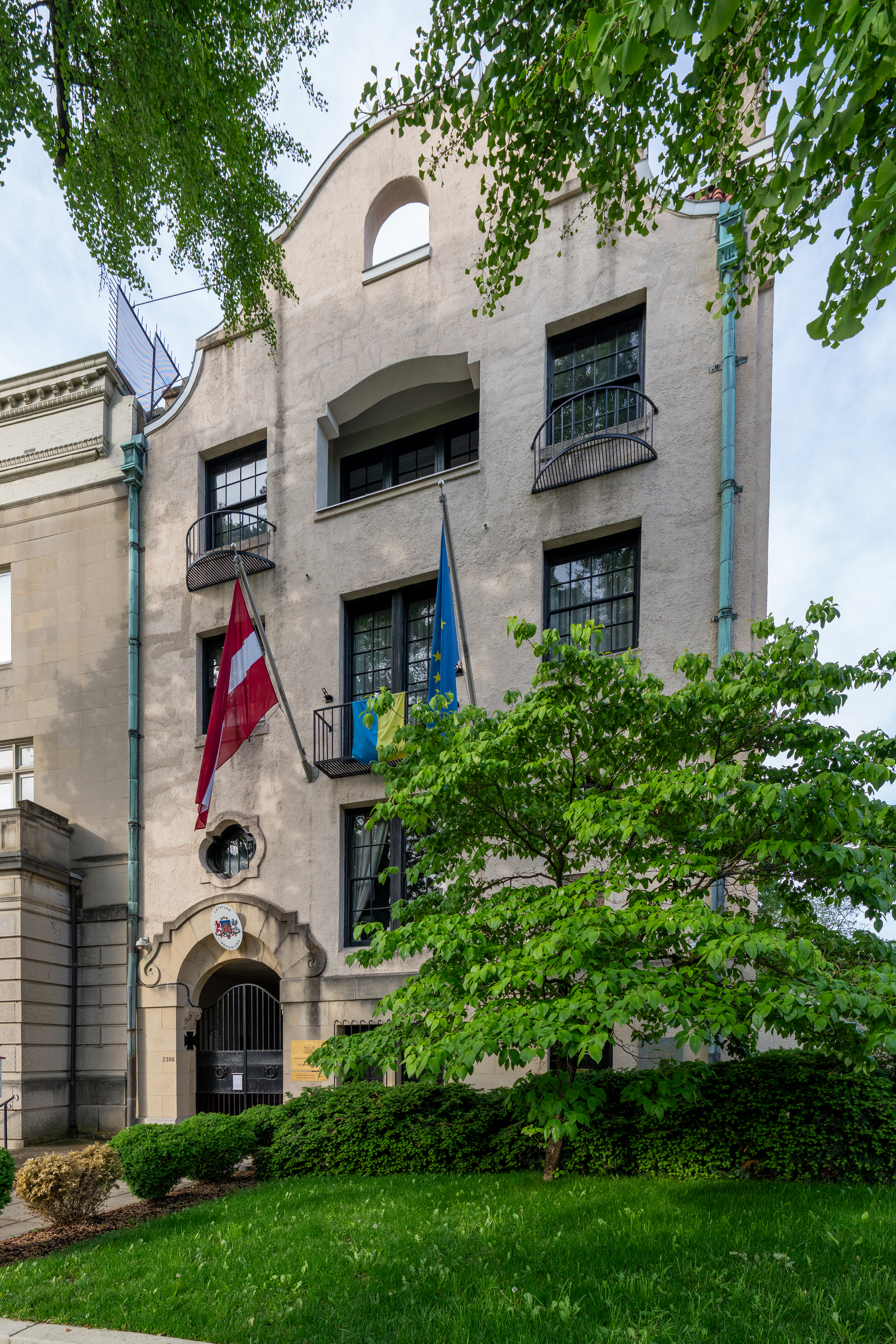
Embassy in Washington, D.C.

== Closed missions ==
=== Europe ===
Host country	Host city	Mission	Year closed	Ref.
Portugal	Lisbon	Embassy (Note: Resident in Dublin, Ireland)	2016	
Russia	Kaliningrad	Embassy branch office	2022	
Russia	Pskov	Consulate	2022	
Russia	Saint Petersburg	Consulate-General	2022	
Slovenia	Ljubljana	Embassy (Note: Resident in Budapest, Hungary)	2014	

== See also ==
- Foreign relations of Latvia
- List of diplomatic missions in Latvia
- Ministry of Foreign Affairs (Latvia)
