= Per Carlsen (diplomat) =

Danish diplomat (1948–2020)

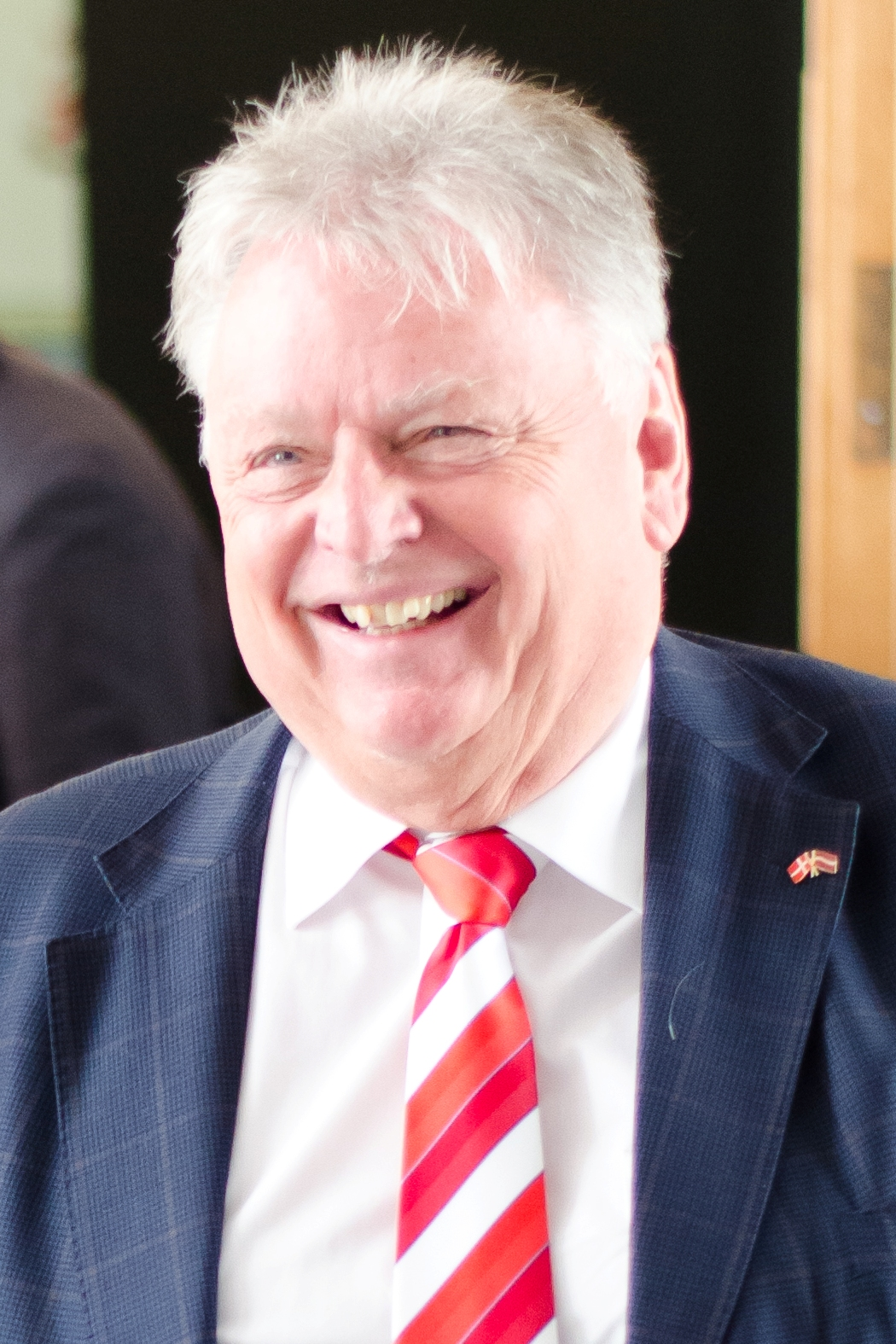
Per Carlsen in 2013

Per Carlsen (1948 – 14 December 2020) was the Ambassador Extraordinary and Plenipotentiary of the Kingdom of Denmark to Latvia from 2010 through 2015. In 1997-2001 he served as the Danish ambassador to Lithuania, and in 2005-2010 he served as the Danish ambassador to the Russian Federation.

== See also ==
- Embassy of Denmark in Moscow
