= Federica Bigi =

Sammarinese diplomat and politician

Federica Bigi is a Sammarinese diplomat and politician. As of 2009, she is San Marino's Minister for Foreign and Political Affairs. She had previously served as San Marino's Ambassador and Permanent Representative to the United Nations Office at Geneva, and as Ambassador of San Marino to Latvia.

Bigi speaks fluent French.
