= Greece–Latvia relations =

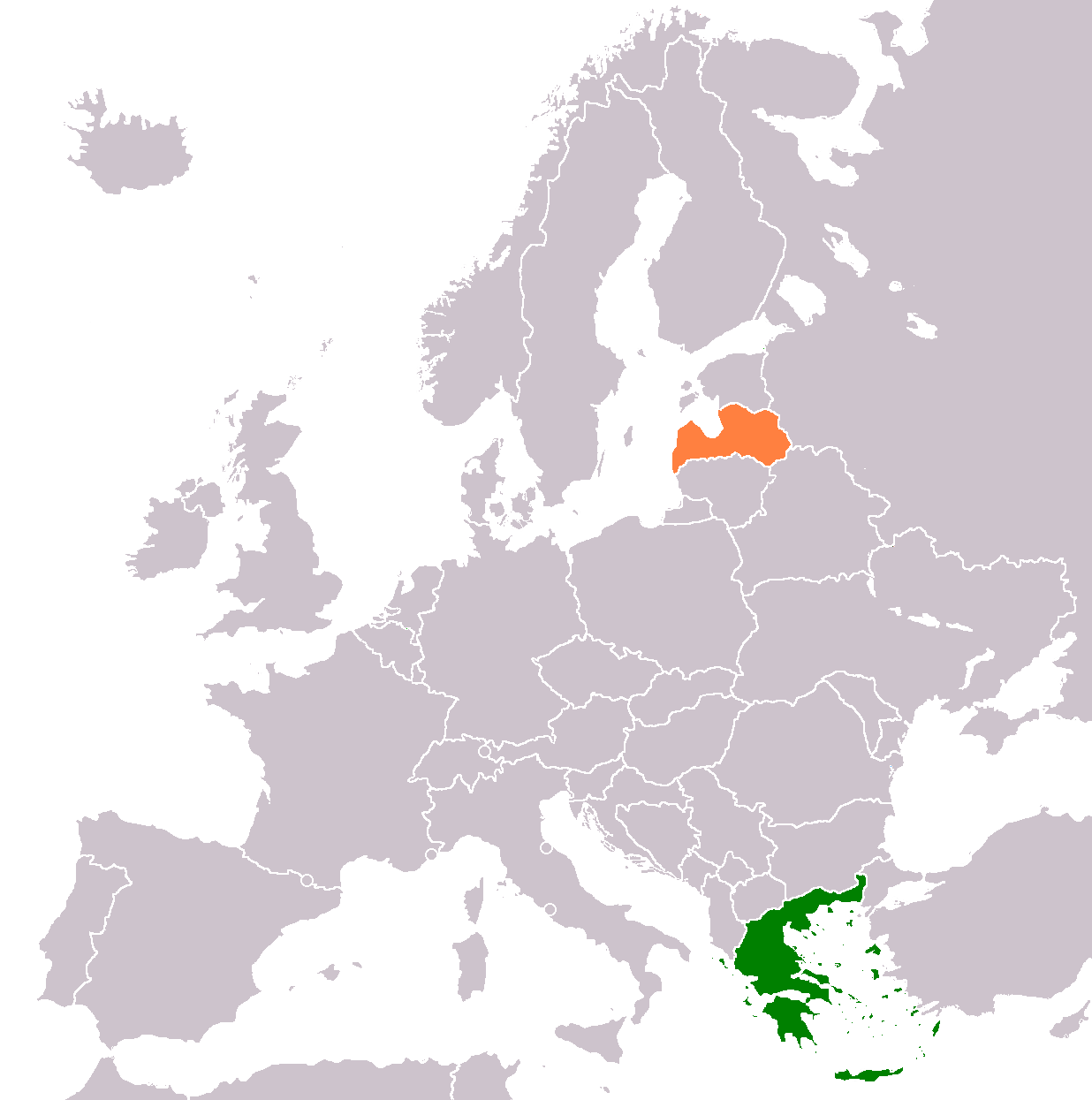

- Greece: Latvia

Greece–Latvia relations are the bilateral relations between Greece and Latvia. Both countries are full members of the Organization for Security and Co-operation in Europe, of NATO and the European Union. The Latvian embassy in Athens was established in 1998. Latvia also has two honorary consulates in Piraeus and in Thessaloniki. The Greek embassy in Riga was opened in January 2005.

== History ==
Greece recognized the State of Latvia on May 23, 1922. Relations between the two countries were disrupted by World War II, which saw Latvia occupied briefly by Germany and then for a longer period by the Soviets. Latvia's return to independence was recognized by Greece on August 27, 1991; followed by the restoration of diplomatic relations on September 2, 1991. Greece had never officially recognized the annexation of the Baltic states by the former Soviet Union.

== High level visits ==
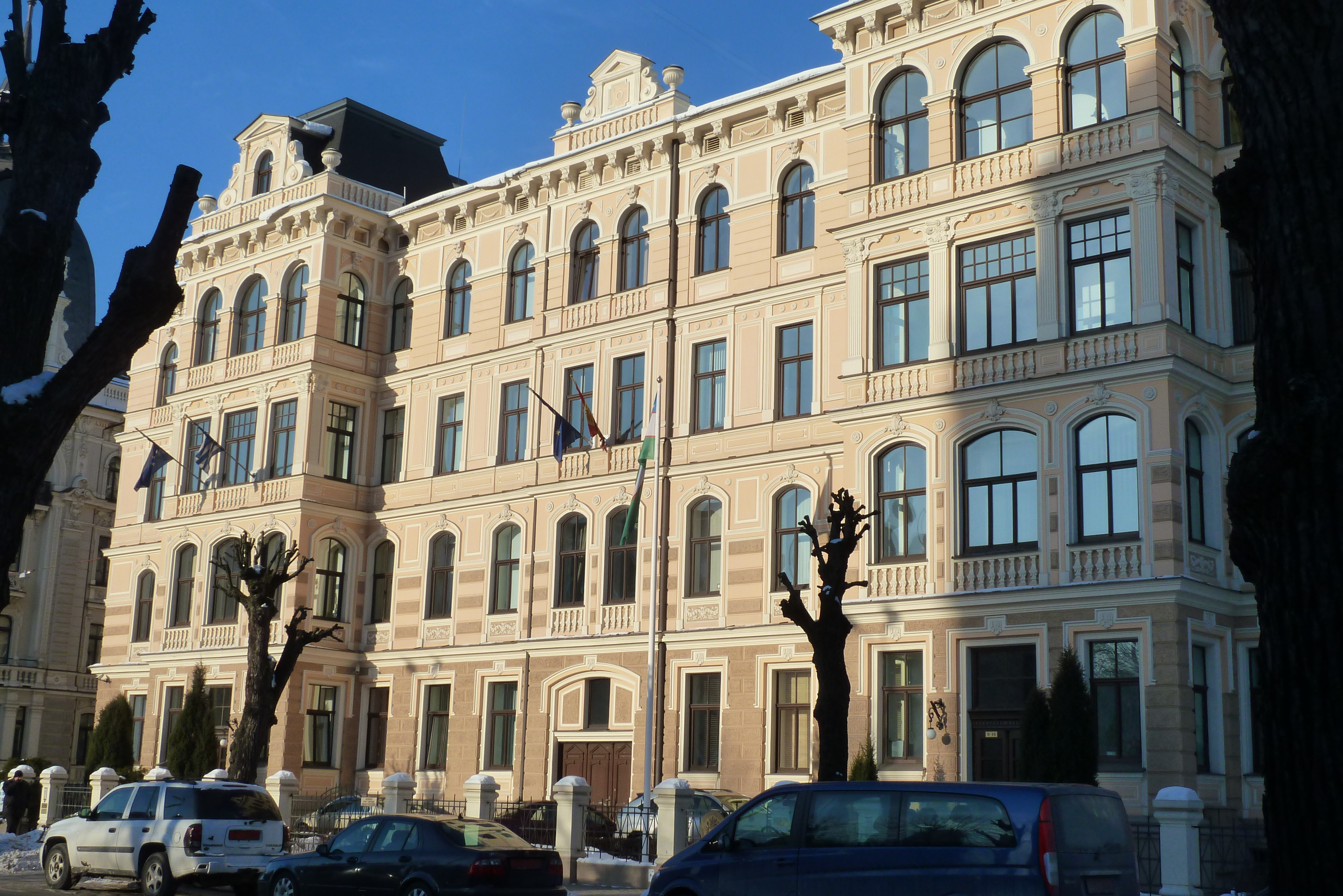
Embassy of Greece in Riga

Several ministerial and state visits have occurred since 1997:

- 27 August 1997 to 31 August 1997; Valdis Birkavs, the Latvian Minister of Foreign Affairs visited Greece.
- 14 October 1997 to 15 October 1997; George Papandreou, the Alternate Minister of Foreign Affairs visited Latvia.
- 16 March 1999 to 20 March 1999; Guntis Ulmanis, the President of Latvia visited Greece.
- 19 October 1999; Christos Rokofyllos, the Alternate Minister of Foreign Affairs visited Latvia.
- 8 October 2000 to 11 October 2000; Konstantinos Stephanopoulos, the President of Greece visited Latvia. Greece agreed to support Latvia's bid to join NATO and the European Union.
- 12 May 2001 to 22 May 2001; Vaira Vike-Freiberga, the President of Latvia meets with Konstantinos Stephanopoulos, the President of Greece in the summit titled "Towards a New Economy: the Revolution of Information" in Athens. They discuss Latvia's entry into the European Union and NATO.
- 27 March 2002 to 29 March 2002; Vaira Vīķe-Freiberga, the President of Latvia visited Greece and discussed the relations between the countries.
- 1 July 2002; Visit to Latvia by the Alternate Minister of Foreign Affairs of Greece, Anastasios Giannitsis.
- May 2003; Kostas Simitis, the Prime Minister of Greece visited Latvia.
- August 2004; Vaira Vīķe-Freiberga, the President of Latvia visited Greece during the 2004 Summer Olympics.

== Bilateral agreements ==
Several bilateral agreements are in place:

- 1998 International Carriage of Passengers and Goods by Road
- 1998 Protection and mutual promotion of investments
- 1999 Agreement on Mutual Abolition of Visa Requirements
- 2000 Economic and technological cooperation
- 2001 Cooperation in the Fields of Culture, Education and Science
- 2002 Avoidance of double taxation

== Trade ==
Greece's exports to Latvia in 2006 included: chemicals (19.2% of total exports), processed foods (18.7%), metals (18.7%), clothing (13.5%), and raw fruit and vegetables (8.2%). Greece imports from Latvia in 2006 included: timber (42% of total imports), minerals (17.3%), clothing (13.8%). Greece has a trade surplus with Latvia.

== See also ==
- Foreign relations of Greece
- Foreign relations of Latvia
