= Foreign relations of Latvia =

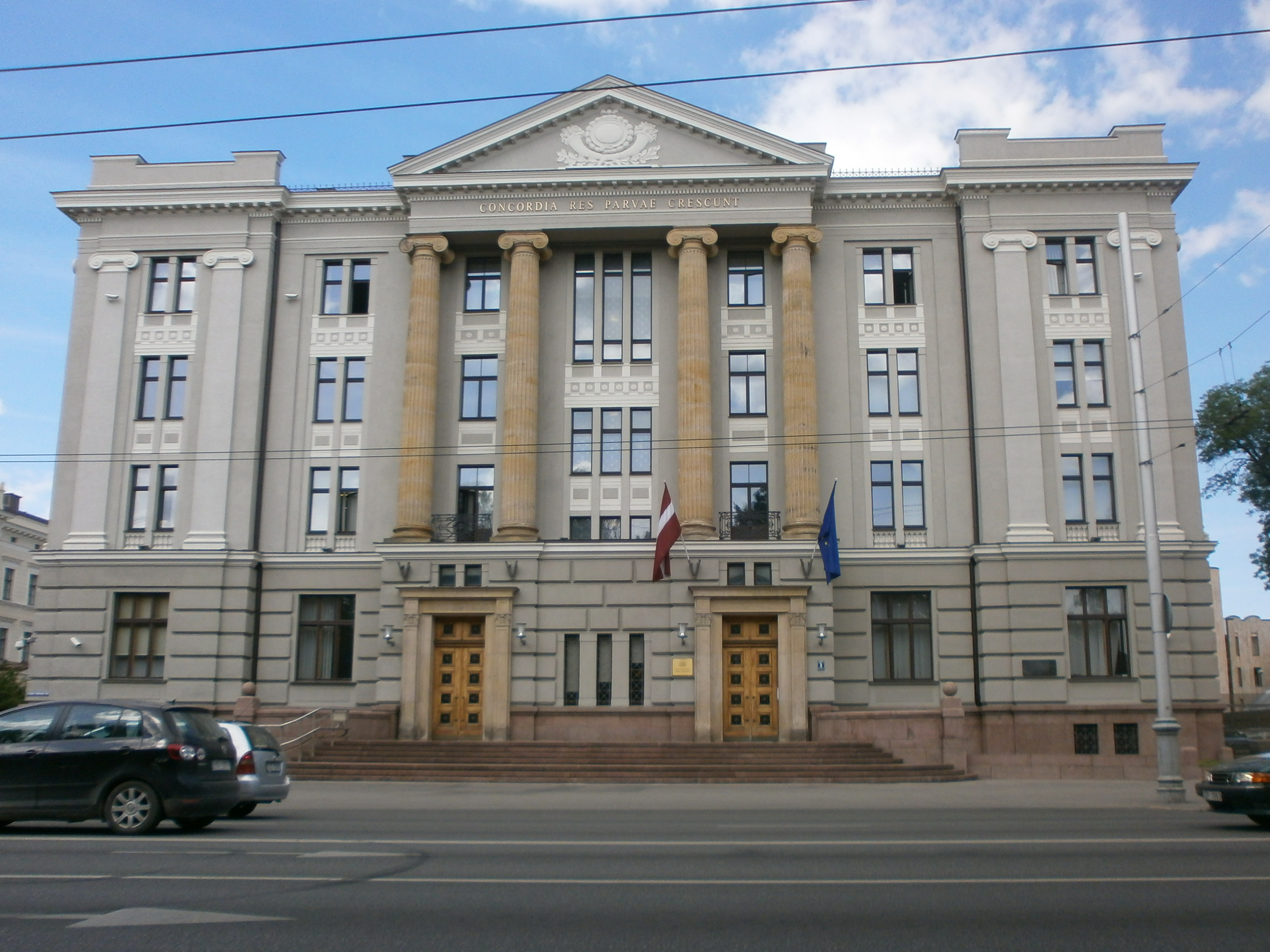
Ministry of Foreign Affairs in Riga

The foreign relations of Latvia are primarily managed by the Ministry of Foreign Affairs. The modern Republic of Latvia considers itself a continuation of the 1918–1940 Latvian state. After declaring the restoration of full independence on August 21, 1991, Latvia joined the United Nations on September 17, 1991, and has since become a signatory to numerous UN organizations and international agreements. On June 3, 2025, Latvia was elected to the United Nations Security Council by the General Assembly.

Latvia actively pursues deeper integration and cooperation with NATO, the European Union (EU), the OECD, and other Western organizations. It also seeks to expand its role in UN peacekeeping missions worldwide.

Latvia is a member of several international organizations, including:

- Council of Europe (CoE)
- International Council for the Exploration of the Sea
- International Civil Aviation Organization (ICAO)
- International Atomic Energy Agency (IAEA)
- United Nations Educational, Scientific and Cultural Organization (UNESCO)
- United Nations International Children's Emergency Fund (UNICEF)
- International Criminal Court (ICC)
- World Bank, International Monetary Fund (IMF), and European Bank for Reconstruction and Development (EBRD)
- Organization for Security and Co-operation in Europe (OSCE)
- North Atlantic Coordinating Council (NACC)
- CERCO

In a nationwide referendum on September 20, 2003, Latvians voted in favor of joining the European Union. Latvia officially became an EU member state on May 1, 2004. It also joined NATO on March 29, 2004.

On April 11, 2024, Latvia signed a 10-year security agreement with Ukraine.

== Multilateral ==
Organization	Formal Relations Began	Notes
European Union		See 2004 enlargement of the European Union Latvia joined the European Union as a full member on 1 May 2004.
NATO		Latvia joined NATO as a full member on 29 March 2004.

== Diplomatic relations ==
List of countries which Latvia maintains diplomatic relations with:

#	Country	Date
1	Denmark	24 August 1991
2	Iceland	26 August 1991
3	Australia	27 August 1991
4	Norway	27 August 1991
5	Germany	28 August 1991
6	Sweden	28 August 1991
7	Finland	29 August 1991
8	France	30 August 1991
9	Italy	30 August 1991
10	Poland	30 August 1991
11	Greece	2 September 1991
12	Hungary	2 September 1991
13	Canada	3 September 1991
14	Belgium	5 September 1991
15	Switzerland	5 September 1991
16	United Kingdom	5 September 1991
17	United States	5 September 1991
18	Estonia	6 September 1991
19	Bulgaria	10 September 1991
20	China	12 September 1991
21	Romania	13 September 1991
22	Mauritania	18 September 1991
23	Netherlands	24 September 1991
24	Argentina	26 September 1991
25	Chile	26 September 1991
26	North Korea	26 September 1991
27	Slovenia	30 September 1991
–	Holy See	1 October 1991
28	Portugal	2 October 1991
29	Russia	4 October 1991
30	Lithuania	5 October 1991
31	Ireland	9 October 1991
32	Spain	9 October 1991
33	Japan	10 October 1991
34	Mongolia	15 October 1991
35	South Korea	22 October 1991
36	Turkey	22 October 1991
37	South Africa	4 November 1991
38	Mexico	27 November 1991
39	India	7 December 1991
40	Philippines	17 December 1991
41	Jamaica	18 December 1991
42	New Zealand	19 December 1991
43	Cyprus	20 December 1991
44	Cuba	20 December 1991
45	Malta	1 January 1992
46	Ghana	3 January 1992
47	Israel	6 January 1992
48	Austria	19 January 1992
49	Singapore	20 January 1992
50	Egypt	23 January 1992
51	Luxembourg	29 January 1992
52	Ukraine	12 February 1992
53	Vietnam	12 February 1992
54	Yemen	13 February 1992
55	Croatia	14 February 1992
56	Thailand	19 March 1992
57	Belarus	7 April 1992
58	Nepal	20 April 1992
59	Venezuela	23 April 1992
60	Albania	29 April 1992
61	Mozambique	29 April 1992
62	Paraguay	3 June 1992
63	Senegal	9 June 1992
64	Tunisia	26 June 1992
65	Uruguay	6 July 1992
66	Iran	7 July 1992
67	Brazil	18 July 1992
68	Armenia	22 August 1992
69	Moldova	1 September 1992
70	Morocco	5 October 1992
71	Cape Verde	21 October 1992
72	Ecuador	21 October 1992
73	Uzbekistan	3 November 1992
74	Mali	26 November 1992
75	Kazakhstan	10 December 1992
76	Czech Republic	1 January 1993
77	Slovakia	1 January 1993
78	Guatemala	14 January 1993
79	Bangladesh	21 January 1993
80	Oman	5 February 1993
81	Turkmenistan	5 February 1993
82	Georgia	11 March 1993
83	Kyrgyzstan	18 March 1993
84	Antigua and Barbuda	19 March 1993
85	Burundi	24 May 1993
86	Syria	25 May 1993
87	Malaysia	12 June 1993
88	Indonesia	25 August 1993
89	Azerbaijan	11 January 1994
90	Panama	22 March 1994
91	Seychelles	24 March 1994
92	Tajikistan	11 May 1994
93	Maldives	20 June 1994
94	Nicaragua	20 June 1994
95	Kuwait	15 July 1994
96	São Tomé and Príncipe	26 July 1994
97	Jordan	12 September 1994
98	Laos	27 April 1995
99	Colombia	19 July 1995
–	Sovereign Military Order of Malta	15 August 1995
100	United Arab Emirates	18 September 1995
101	Cambodia	22 September 1995
102	North Macedonia	14 March 1996
103	Bosnia and Herzegovina	19 April 1996
104	Chad	23 April 1996
105	Kenya	23 April 1996
106	Pakistan	29 April 1996
107	Ivory Coast	4 June 1996
108	Peru	23 July 1996
109	Andorra	27 August 1996
110	Sri Lanka	19 September 1996
111	Gabon	31 October 1996
112	Liechtenstein	3 December 1996
113	Qatar	10 December 1996
114	Guinea	17 January 1997
115	Zambia	27 February 1997
116	Benin	19 March 1997
117	Namibia	11 April 1997
118	Tanzania	28 November 1997
119	Lebanon	16 January 1998
120	Gambia	12 March 1998
121	Algeria	29 April 1998
122	Malawi	10 September 1998
123	San Marino	7 March 2000
124	Bahrain	27 March 2000
125	Brunei	14 July 2000
126	El Salvador	11 January 2001
127	Serbia	19 January 2001
128	Nigeria	30 March 2001
129	Dominican Republic	15 August 2001
130	Mauritius	12 February 2003
131	Trinidad and Tobago	11 March 2003
132	Botswana	17 March 2003
133	Saudi Arabia	21 March 2003
134	Costa Rica	15 May 2003
135	Honduras	1 July 2003
136	Bolivia	8 July 2003
137	Iraq	15 October 2004
138	Afghanistan	18 January 2005
139	Bahamas	20 January 2005
140	Belize	3 February 2005
141	Guyana	16 March 2005
142	Montenegro	19 June 2006
143	Saint Lucia	21 June 2006
144	Saint Vincent and the Grenadines	25 August 2006
145	Haiti	14 December 2006
146	Libya	16 February 2007
147	Rwanda	10 April 2007
148	Dominica	27 September 2007
149	Fiji	7 March 2008
150	Ethiopia	11 March 2008
151	Barbados	15 May 2008
–	Kosovo	10 June 2008
152	Monaco	15 October 2008
153	Equatorial Guinea	13 November 2008
154	Suriname	20 May 2009
155	Saint Kitts and Nevis	8 June 2009
156	Comoros	24 February 2010
157	Democratic Republic of the Congo	14 January 2011
158	Burkina Faso	6 April 2011
159	Angola	7 July 2011
160	Tuvalu	7 July 2011
161	Djibouti	30 March 2012
162	Eritrea	5 April 2012
163	Niger	17 April 2012
164	Central African Republic	30 May 2012
165	Samoa	28 June 2012
166	Solomon Islands	28 June 2012
167	Grenada	19 September 2012
168	Myanmar	26 September 2012
169	Republic of the Congo	26 September 2013
170	Timor-Leste	27 September 2013
171	Uganda	1 October 2013
172	Lesotho	10 February 2014
173	Liberia	10 April 2014
174	Togo	23 September 2014
175	Somalia	26 September 2014
176	Sierra Leone	12 December 2014
177	Sudan	23 January 2015
178	Zimbabwe	23 January 2015
179	Federated States of Micronesia	25 February 2015
180	Palau	20 March 2015
181	Vanuatu	7 April 2015
182	Kiribati	10 April 2015
183	Cameroon	16 April 2015
184	Papua New Guinea	9 May 2018
185	Nauru	21 May 2018
186	Madagascar	26 September 2018
187	Eswatini	16 November 2018
188	Tonga	28 October 2020
189	Guinea-Bissau	14 July 2021
190	South Sudan	23 September 2021
191	Marshall Islands	19 September 2022

== Relations by country ==
=== Americas ===
Country	Formal Relations Began	Notes
Canada	1921-01-26, 1991-08-26	See Canada–Latvia relations: Both countries re-established diplomatic relations on September 3, 1991.; Canada has an embassy in Riga.; Latvia has an embassy in Ottawa and 2 honorary consulates in Quebec and Toronto.; Both countries are full members of the Organization for Security and Co-operation in Europe and of NATO.
Colombia	1922-07-08, 1995-07-19	Colombia counts with an honorary consulate in Riga.; Latvia counts with an honorary consulate in Bogotá and is represented by the German embassy in Colombia for consular services only.; Colombia recognized Latvia as an independent country after the dissolution of the Soviet Union in 1991.
Mexico	27 November 1991	See Latvia–Mexico relations: Latvia is accredited to Mexico from its embassy in Washington, D.C., United States, and maintains an honorary consulate in Mexico City.; Mexico is accredited to Latvia from its embassy in Stockholm, Sweden and maintains an honorary consulate in Riga.
United States	1922-07-28	See Latvia – United States relations: The U.S. Legation in Riga was officially established on November 13, 1922 and served as the headquarters for U.S. representation in the Baltics during the interwar era. The Soviet invasion forced the closure of the legation on September 5, 1940, but Latvian representation in the United States has continued uninterrupted for 85 years.; The U.S. Embassy in Latvia is located in Riga.

=== Asia ===
Country	Formal Relations Began	Notes
Armenia	22 August 1992	See Armenia–Latvia relations: Armenia is represented in Latvia through its embassy in Warsaw (Poland).; Latvia is represented in Armenia through a non-resident ambassador based in Riga (at the Ministry of Foreign Affairs) and through an honorary consulate in Yerevan.; Latvia recognized the Armenian genocide in 2021.; Latvian Ministry of Foreign Affairs about relations with Armenia
Azerbaijan	1994-01-11	See Azerbaijan–Latvia relations: Azerbaijan has an embassy in Riga.; Latvia has an embassy in Baku.; Both countries are full members of the Council of Europe and the Organization for Security and Co-operation in Europe (OSCE).; Both countries were former republics of the Soviet Union.; Azerbaijan recognized the independence of Latvia on 30 August 1991.; Latvia recognized the independence of Azerbaijan on 8 January 1992.; Latvian Ministry of Foreign Affairs about relations with Azerbaijan
China		See China–Latvia relations: China has an embassy in Riga.; Latvia has an embassy in Beijing.; In June 2020, Latvia openly opposed the Hong Kong national security law
Iraq	2004-10-15	Iraq recognized the independence of Latvia on January 1, 1992.; In 2005, a project entitled Latvian Government's Assistance to Iraq in the Documentation of Architectural and Archaeological Objects with Photogrammetric Methods was implemented.la; Latvia's participation in the Iraq War commenced in May 2003. At their peak the number of Latvian soldiers in Iraq was 126. They were withdrawn on November 8, 2008.; Ministry of Foreign Affairs of the Republic of Latvia: Iraq
Israel	1992-01-06	See Israel–Latvia relations: Israel recognized Latvia's independence on September 4, 1991.; Israel has an embassy in Riga.; Latvia has an embassy in Tel Aviv and 2 honorary consulates (in Ashdod and Eilat).; There are 9,000 Jews living in Latvia (see History of the Jews in Latvia).; Both countries are full members of the Union for the Mediterranean.
Japan	10 October 1991	See Japan–Latvia relations: Latvia has an embassy in Tokyo.; Japan has an embassy in Riga.
Kazakhstan	1992-12-30	See Kazakhstan–Latvia relations: Kazakhstan recognised Latvia's independence on December 23, 1991.; Latvia recognised the independence of Kazakhstan on January 8, 1992.; Kazakhstan is represented in Latvia through its embassy in Vilnius (Lithuania) and though an honorary consulate in Riga.; Latvia has an embassy in Astana and an honorary consulate in Almaty.; Latvian Ministry of Foreign Affairs about the relation with Kazakhstan
Kyrgyzstan	1993-03-18	Both countries established diplomatic relations on March 18, 1993.; Both countries are full members of the Organization for Security and Co-operation in Europe.
Malaysia		Latvia doesn't have any embassy in Malaysia. while Malaysian embassy in Helsinki is accredited to Latvia.
South Korea	1991-10-22	See Latvia–South Korea relations The establishment of diplomatic relations between the Republic of Korea and Latvijas Republika began on 1991-10-22.: The two countries have good relations.; Deputy Minister for Political Affairs Lee Kyung-soo visited to the Latvia in December 2018 and attended a plaque-hanging ceremony of the Republic of Korea embassy in Riga which is the Republic of Korea's first permanent mission in the Baltic region and a reception to celebrate the opening of the embassy.; Latvian embassy and an Honorary Consuls in Seoul.; South Korean embassy in Latvia.
Taiwan	1923	See Latvia–Taiwan relations: Both countries had relations from 1923 to 1991.; The Republic of China (Taiwan) never recognized the de jure incorporation of Latvia into the Soviet Union.
Tajikistan	1994-05-11	Both countries established diplomatic relations on May 11, 1994.; Both countries are full members of the Organization for Security and Co-operation in Europe.
Turkey		See Latvia–Turkey relations: Latvia has an embassy in Ankara.; Turkey has an embassy in Riga.; Both countries are full members of the Council of Europe and NATO.

=== Europe ===
Country	Formal Relations Began	Notes
Albania	16 February 1928, 22 April 1992	See Albania–Latvia relations: Both countries established diplomatic relations in 1928, which were restored in 1992.; Albania is represented in Latvia by its embassy in Warsaw, Poland.; Latvia is represented in Albania by its embassy in Rome, Italy and an honorary consulate in Tirana.; Both countries have a number of bilateral agreements.
Austria		Austria has an embassy in Riga.; Latvia has an embassy in Vienna.; Both countries are full members of the European Union.
Belgium		Belgium is accredited to Latvia from its embassy in Stockholm, Sweden.; Latvia has an embassy in Brussels.; Both countries are full members of the European Union and NATO.
Bulgaria	1922-05-24, 1991-09-10	See Bulgaria–Latvia relations Bulgaria is represented in Latvia through its embassy in Warsaw (Poland) and through an honorary consulate in Riga. Latvia is represented in Bulgaria through its embassy in Warsaw (Poland) and through an honorary consulate in Sofia. Both countries are full members of NATO and of the European Union.
Croatia		See Foreign relations of Croatia: Croatia is represented in Latvia through its embassy in Budapest (Hungary).; Latvia is represented in Croatia through its embassy in Stockholm (Sweden).; Both countries are full members of the European Union and NATO.
Cyprus		See Cyprus–Latvia relations: Cyprus is represented in Latvia through its embassy in Stockholm (Sweden).; Latvia is represented in Cyprus through its embassy in Athens (Greece).; Both countries are full members of the European Union.
Czech Republic		Czech Republic has an embassy in Riga.; Latvia has an embassy in Prague.; Both countries are full members of the European Union and NATO.
Denmark		See Denmark–Latvia relations: Denmark has an embassy in Riga.; Latvia has an embassy in Copenhagen.; Both countries are full members of the European Union and NATO.
Estonia	1919-07-21, 1991-09-06	See Estonia–Latvia relations: Both states share a long common history: before 1918, they were both part of the Russian Empire.; They were both re-occupied by the USSR between 1945 and 1991. Both countries established diplomatic relations on January 3, 1992.; Estonia has an embassy in Riga. Latvia has an embassy in Tallinn.; The two states share 343 km of common borders.
Finland	24 September 1919	See Finland–Latvia relations Prime Minister Sanna Marin met Latvia's Prime Minister Krišjānis Kariņš 12 February 2020: Finland recognised Latvia's independence de facto on September 24, 1919, and de jure on January 21, 1921.; Finland has an embassy in Riga.; Latvia has an embassy in Helsinki and four honorary consulates (in Åland, Satakunta, Kymenlaakso and Oulu).; Both countries are full members of the Council of the Baltic Sea States, the European Union, NATO and Joint Expeditionary Force (JEF).
France	1921-01-26, 1991-08-30	See France–Latvia relations: France has an embassy in Riga.; Latvia has an embassy in Paris.; Both countries are full members of the European Union and NATO.
Georgia		See Georgia–Latvia relations
Germany		See Germany–Latvia relations: Germany has an embassy in Riga.; Latvia has an embassy in Berlin.; Both countries are full members of the European Union and NATO.
Greece		See Greece-Latvia relations: Greece has an embassy in Riga.; Latvia has an embassy in Athens.; Both countries are full members of the European Union and NATO.
Iceland		See Iceland–Latvia relations Iceland was the first country to recognise the independence of Latvia in August 1991. Both countries re-established diplomatic relations on August 22, 1991. Iceland is represented in Latvia through its embassy in Helsinki (Finland). Latvia is represented in Iceland through its embassy in Oslo (Norway) and an honorary consulate in Reykjavik. Both countries are full members of the Council of the Baltic Sea States, of NATO, and of the Council of Europe.
Italy		Italy has an embassy in Riga.; Latvia has an embassy in Rome.; Both countries are full members of the European Union and NATO.
Kosovo	10 June 2008	See Kosovo–Latvia relations Latvia recognized it on February 20, 2008. Latvian and Kosovan governments established diplomatic relations on June 10, 2008. However, Latvia's involvement in Kosovo date back to 2000 when it first sent peacekeeping troops.
Lithuania	1991-10-05	See Latvia–Lithuania relations: Latvia has an embassy in Vilnius.; Lithuania has an embassy in Riga.; The two states share 588 kilometres (365 mi) of common border. Both countries are full members of the European Union.
Luxembourg		Luxembourg did not recognise the annexation of the Baltic States by the USSR in 1940–1991 either de jure or de facto.; Diplomatic relations between the two countries were restored on April 21, 1992.; Latvia is represented in Luxembourg through its embassy in Brussel (Belgium) and through an honorary consulate in Luxembourg City. Luxembourg is represented in Latvia through its embassy in Warsaw (Poland) and through an honorary consulate in Riga.; Both countries are full members of NATO and of the European Union.
Moldova		Both countries established diplomatic relations on September 1, 1992.; Both countries are full members of the Organization for Security and Co-operation in Europe.
Montenegro	19 June 2006	See Latvia–Montenegro relations
Netherlands		See Latvia–Netherlands relations: Latvia has an embassy in The Hague.; Netherlands has an embassy in Riga.; Both nations are members of the European Union and NATO.
Norway		See Latvia–Norway relations
Poland	1991-08-30	See Latvia–Poland relations: Poland recognised Latvia's independence on January 27, 1921.; Latvia has an embassy in Warsaw and 3 honorary consulates (in Katowice, Gdańsk and Łódź).; Poland has an embassy in Riga.; There are around 57,000 Poles living in Latvia.; Both countries are full members of the Council of the Baltic Sea States, of NATO and of the European Union.; Latvian Ministry of Foreign Affairs about relations with Poland
Portugal		Latvia is accredited to Portugal from its embassy in Dublin, Ireland.; Portugal is accredited to Latvia from its embassy in Stockholm, Sweden.; Both countries are full members of the European Union and NATO.
Romania	1922-01-03	Between June 2, 1922 – October 18, 1939, the diplomatic representation of Latvia in Romania was handled by the Latvian legation in Prague, in then neighbouring Czechoslovakia. In 1924, Latvia opened 3 honorary consulates in Romania (in Bucharest, Constanţa and Galaţi). In May 1929, Romania opened its legation in Riga.; On October 18, 1939, Latvia opened its legation in Bucharest.; Romania recognized Latvia on August 26, 1991.; Both countries re-established diplomatic relations on September 13, 1991.; Latvia is represented in Romania through its embassy in Warsaw (Poland).; Romania is represented in Latvia through its embassy in Vilnius (Lithuania) and an honorary consulate in Riga.; Both countries are full members of NATO, the European Union, and the Organization for Security and Co-operation in Europe.; Latvian Ministry of Foreign Affairs about relations with Romania
Russia	1920-10-04 and again 1991-10-04	See Latvia–Russia relations: Until 1917, Latvia had been part of the Russian empire. Following the Latvian declaration of independence, war broke out between Latvia and the Russian SFSR.; Diplomatic relations between the two countries were first established in 1920, following the conclusion of a Soviet-Latvian peace treaty on August 11, 1920. The treaty was ratified by the Latvian Constituent Assembly on September 2, and by the Latvian government on September 25. On the Russian side, it was ratified by the Pan Russian Central Executive Committee on September 9. Ratification letters were exchanged between the two governments in Moscow on October 4, the date on which in entered into effect. These relations lasted until the Soviet take over of Latvia in 1940.; Following the collapse of the Soviet Union, the Russian government recognized the independence of Latvia on August 24, 1991.; Russia expresses concern for how Latvia's language and naturalization laws effect Latvia's Russian-speaking population. Russians comprised 27.6% of the population in 2010. In turn, Latvia is interested in the welfare of ethnic Latvians still residing in Russia. The latest Russian census shows about 40,000 still living in Russia, but sources indicate that given the probability of an undercount, Latvians in Russia probably number about 50,000–60,000.
Serbia	2001-01-19	See Latvia–Serbia relations: Latvia has a non-resident ambassador in Riga (in the Foreign Ministry).; Serbia has an embassy in Riga.; Latvia is an EU member and Serbia is an EU candidate.; Latvian Foreign Ministry about relations with Serbia; Serbian Ministry of Foreign Affairs about relations with Latvia
Slovakia		Both countries established direct diplomatic relations on January 1, 1993. Latvia is represented in Slovakia through its embassy in Vienna (Austria). Slovakia has an embassy in Riga. Both countries are full members of NATO and of the European Union. Latvian Foreign Minister Indulis Berzins and his Slovak counterpart Eduard Kukan met in Riga in 2000.
Spain		See Latvia–Spain relations: Latvia has an embassy in Madrid.; Spain has an embassy in Riga.; Both countries are members of the European Union and NATO.
Sweden		See Latvia–Sweden relations Sweden recognized Latvia on 4 February 1921. Sweden resumed diplomatic relations with Latvia on 28 August 1991.: Latvia has an embassy in Stockholm.; Sweden has an embassy in Riga.; Both countries are full members of the European Union, NATO and of the Council of Europe.
Ukraine	12 February 1992	See Latvia–Ukraine relations: Latvia has an embassy in Kyiv and 2 honorary consulates (in Lviv and Odesa).; Ukraine has an embassy in Riga and an honorary consulate in Ventspils.; There are around 92,000 Ethnic Ukrainians living in Latvia.; Latvian Ministry of Foreign Affairs about relations with Ukraine
United Kingdom	5 September 1991	See Latvia–United Kingdom relations Latvia established diplomatic relations with the United Kingdom on 5 September 1991.: Latvia maintains an embassy in London.; The United Kingdom is accredited to Lithuania through its embassy in Riga.; Both countries share common membership of the Council of Europe, International Criminal Court, Joint Expeditionary Force, NATO, OECD, OSCE, and the World Trade Organization.

=== Oceania ===
Country	Formal Relations Began	Notes
Australia	21 November 1991	See Australia–Latvia relations: Australia is represented in Latvia through its embassy in Stockholm, Sweden (since 1997) and an honorary consulate in Riga (since 1995).; Latvia has had an embassy in Canberra since October 2021, and also has honorary consulates in Sydney, Brisbane, Adelaide, Melbourne and Perth.

== See also ==
- Honorary Consulate of the Republic of Latvia in Lviv
- List of diplomatic missions of Latvia
- List of diplomatic missions in Latvia
- Ministry of Foreign Affairs (Latvia)
- Visa requirements for Latvian citizens
