= Japan–Latvia relations =

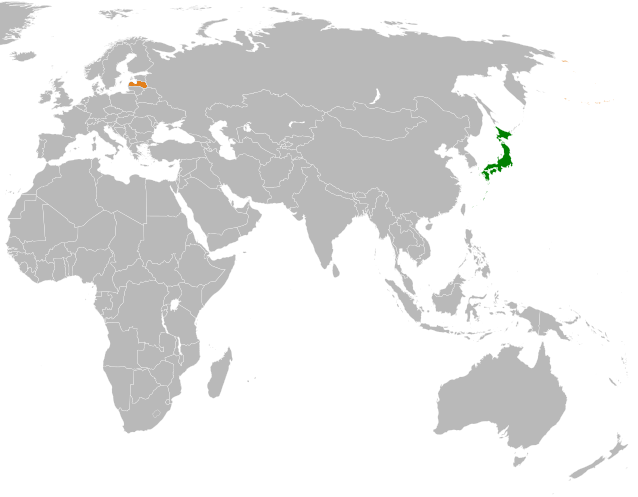

- Japan: Latvia

Japan–Latvia relations are the bilateral relations between Japan and Latvia. Both nations are members of the Organisation for Economic Co-operation and Development.

Latvia has an embassy in Tokyo. Japan has an embassy in Riga.

== History ==
=== Interwar period ===
Taking advantage of the Russian Revolution, Latvia declared independence (the First Latvian Republic). After World War I, it was recognized as an independent country and in 1921 established diplomatic relations with Japan, with the Imperial Japanese Embassy established in Riga. However, when Latvia lost its independence following the Soviet occupation of the Baltic States in 1940, Japan closed its embassy.

=== Modern relations ===
Japan de facto re-recognized Latvia on 6 September 1991, and a month later diplomatic relations were re-established between these countries on 10 October 1991. In June 1992, the Japanese Embassy in Sweden began to accredit Latvia, and as exchanges deepened, the first permanent Japanese ambassador to Latvia took up his post in 2009. In January 2000 the Embassy of Japan was established in Riga and in 2006 the Embassy of Latvia was established in Tokyo.

== High level visits ==
=== High-level visits from Japan to Latvia ===
In May 2007, the Emperor and Empress of Japan, Akihito and Michiko, made an official visit to Latvia.

On 13 January 2018, Japanese Prime Minister Shinzo Abe met with Prime Minister Māris Kučinskis.

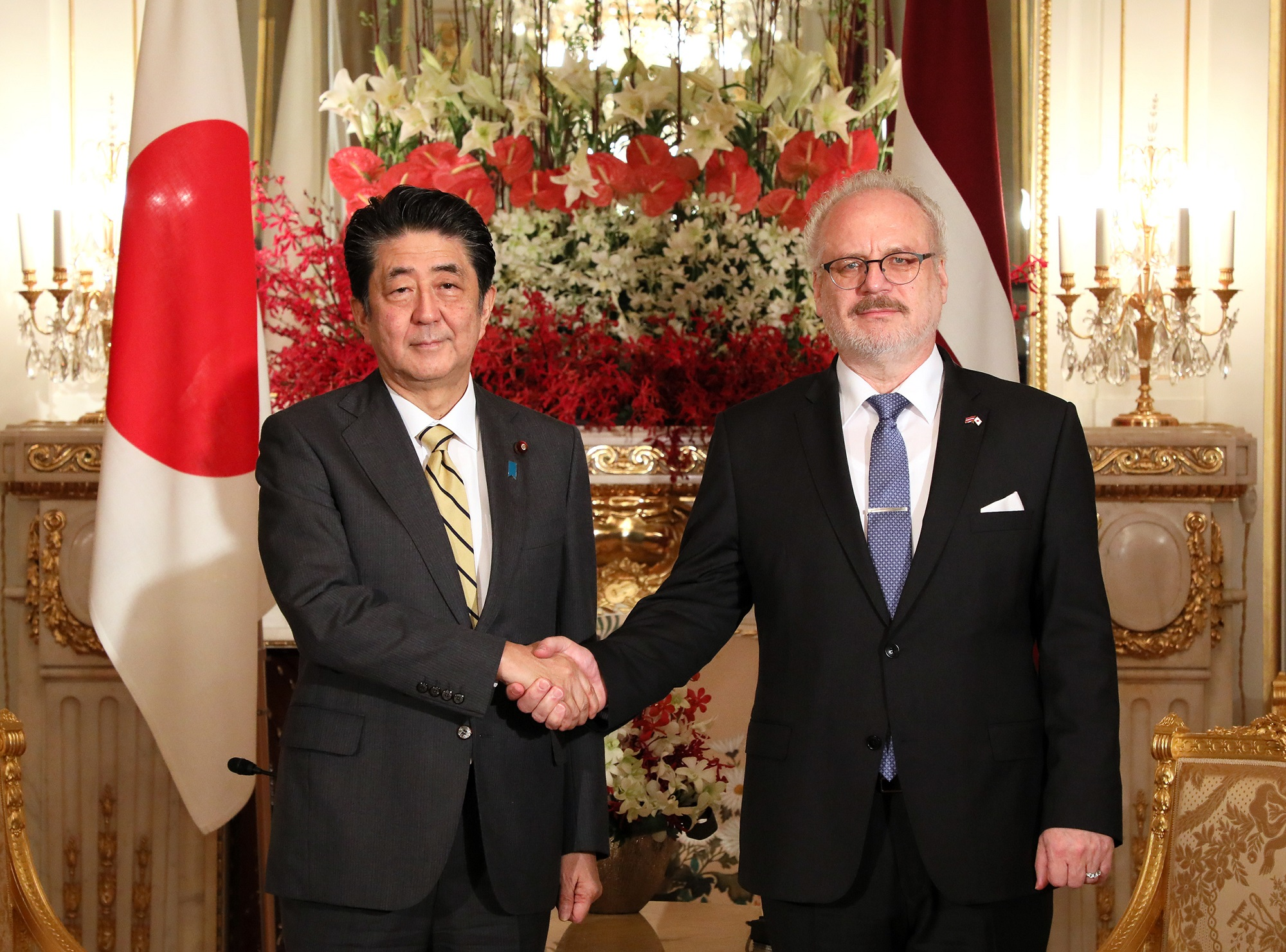
Latvian President Egils Levits meets with the Prime Minister of Japan Shinzo Abe in October 2019

=== High-level visits from Latvia to Japan ===
In April 2006, Prime Minister Aigars Kalvītis travelled to Japan.

In January 2009, Prime Minister Ivars Godmanis travelled to Japan.

In April 2013, Prime Minister Valdis Dombrovskis travelled to Japan.

In December 2017, Prime Minister Māris Kučinskis travelled to Japan.

In October 2019, Latvian President Egils Levits travelled to Tokyo to attend the enthronement of Japanese Emperor Naruhito.

In May 2025, Latvian President Edgars Rinkēvičs travelled to Tokyo to meet with Prime Minister Shigeru Ishiba. He attended Expo 2025 in Osaka, Kansai.

== Economic Exchange ==
In 2018, Japan's trade with Latvia was roughly balanced, with exports totaling ¥ 7.32 billion and imports totaling ¥ 8.86 billion. Japan's exports primarily consisted of rubber products and automobiles, while imports included lumber, peat, and furniture. Seiyu's Doveli pasta brand, directly imported from Latvia, is produced in Latvia.

Latvia was a poor European country at the time of its independence from the Soviet Union. Since the Japan-Latvia Economic Cooperation Policy Consultation in October 1996, Japan has provided development assistance, primarily through technical cooperation and cultural grant aid. Cultural grant aid, in particular, has contributed to the further revitalization of cultural, educational, and artistic activities in Latvia through the provision of audiovisual equipment to the Historical Museum, preservation equipment to the Latvian National Film, Photo, and Audio Archive, and Japanese language learning equipment to schools. These grants have been highly praised by recipient organizations and Latvian government officials alike, contributing to the promotion of friendly relations between Japan and Latvia. Since then, Latvia's economy has grown steadily, joining the European Union and the North Atlantic Treaty Organization in 2004, and the Organization for Economic Cooperation and Development in 2016. Latvia is now considered a developed country. As a result, Japan has suspended its cultural grant aid since 2006, and officially terminated its official development assistance in 2007.

== Cultural Exchange ==
=== Mutual Cultural Promotion ===
As mentioned above, Latvia has previously received extensive cultural cooperation from Japan. Currently, the Embassy of Japan in Latvia is taking the lead in promoting a variety of Japanese culture, both traditional and popular, through events such as Japanese film screenings, flower arranging classes, and Japanese doll exhibitions.

Meanwhile, in Japan, there are organizations that promote friendly relations between the two countries, such as the Kansai Japan-Latvia Association and the Kansai Japan-Latvia Association, and the Japan-Latvian Music Association, which encourages musical cooperation.

=== Sister Cities ===
In 1974, when Latvia was still in the Soviet Union, Kobe City became a sister city with the port city of Riga.

A newspaper reporter from Hokkaido, Higashikawa Town covers Latvia's independence from the Soviet Union. This incident sparked a wide range of unique and private-sector-led exchanges, including a photo exhibition in Latvia, material support in the form of stationery donated to a Japanese language school in Riga, and a visit to Higashikawa by Raimonds Pauls (composer of "A Million Roses"), who was then Latvian Minister of Culture, as a token of appreciation. Other examples included exchange programs and mutual visits by high school students, the invitation of Latvian musicians to Japan, and a concert featuring taiko drums brought from Higashikawa. The first Latvian ambassador to Japan, Peteris Vaivars, immediately visited Higashikawa. The momentum for sister city development grew, and in 2008, Higashikawa and Rujena, the hometown of Peteris Vaivars, became sister cities.

== Resident diplomatic missions ==
- Japan has an embassy in Riga.
- Latvia has an embassy in Tokyo.

== See also ==
- Foreign relations of Japan
- Foreign relations of Latvia
