= Bulgaria–Latvia relations =

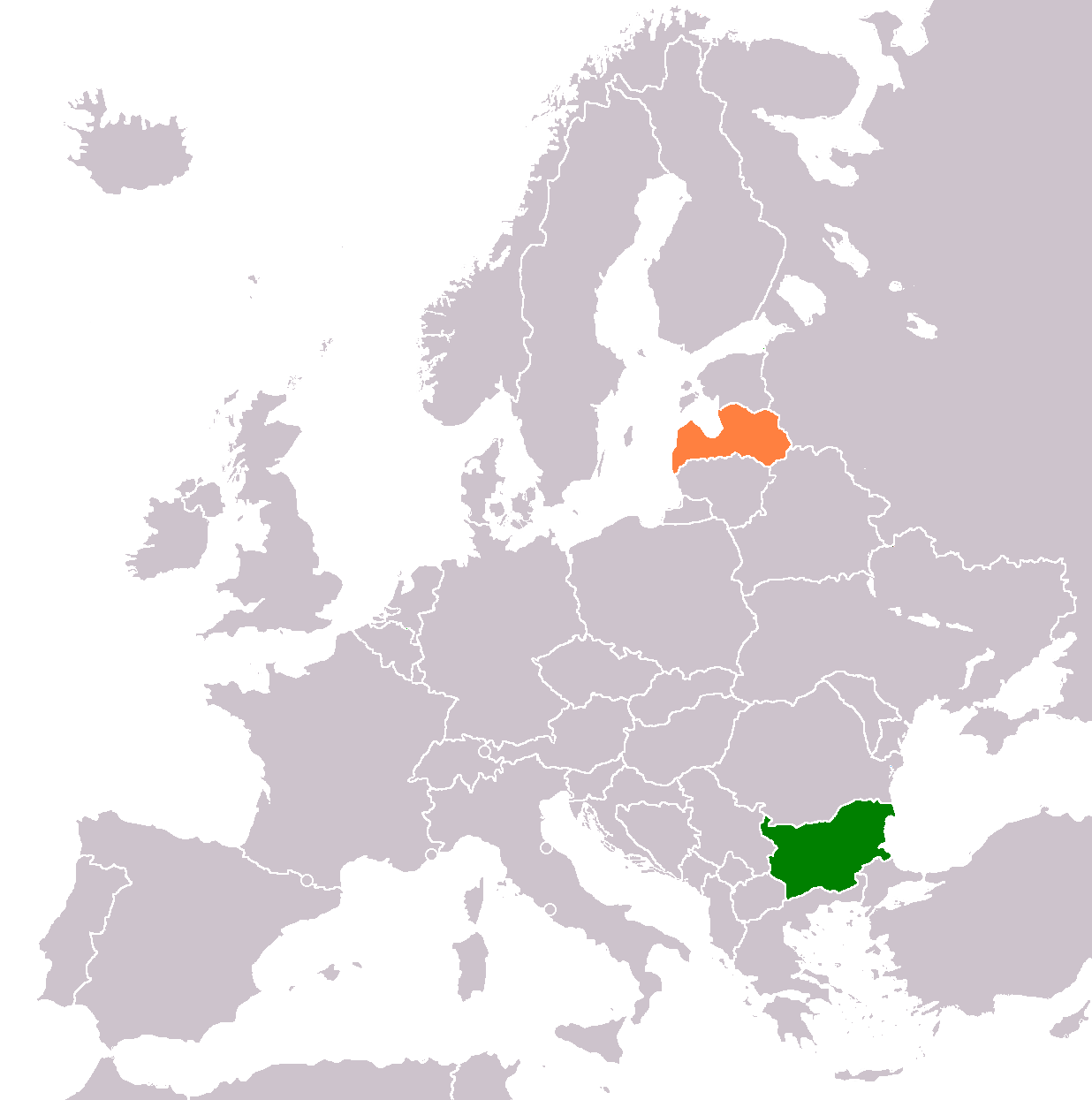

- Bulgaria: Latvia

Bulgaria–Latvia relations are foreign relations between Bulgaria and Latvia. Bulgaria is represented in Latvia through its embassy in Warsaw (Poland). Latvia is represented in Bulgaria through its embassy in Warsaw (Poland). Both countries are full members of the Council of Europe, European Union and NATO, with Latvia supporting Bulgaria's accession to the European Union prior to them joining.

The current non-resident Ambassador of Bulgaria to Latvia is Selver Khalil since 2021. The current non-resident Ambassador of Latvia to Bulgaria is Juris Poikāns since 2022.

== See also ==
- Foreign relations of Bulgaria
- Foreign relations of Latvia
