= Latvia–Mexico relations =

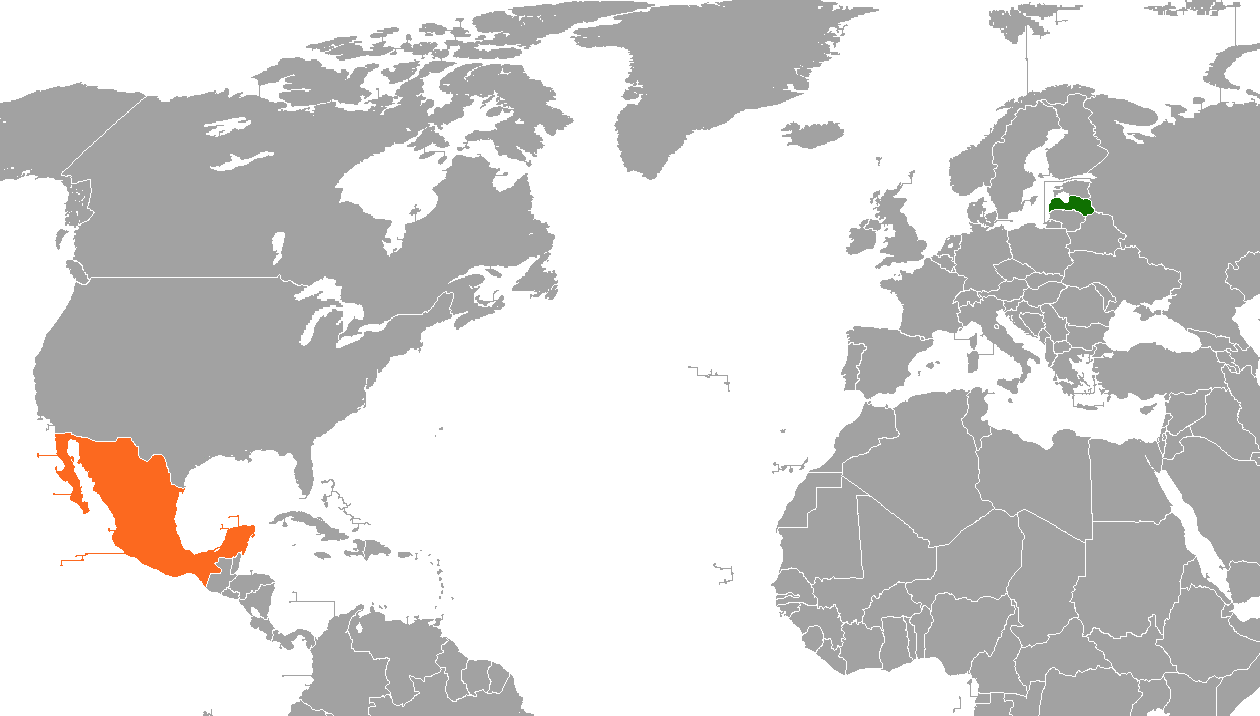

- Latvia: Mexico

The nations of Latvia and Mexico established diplomatic relations in 1991. Both nations are members of the Organisation for Economic Co-operation and Development and the United Nations.

== History ==
In November 1918, Latvia declared its independence from the Russian Empire after World War I. In May 1927, Mexico recognized Latvia's independence. During World War II, Latvia was occupied by both Nazi Germany and the Soviet Union, and after the war, Latvia was forcibly annexed by the Soviet Union in 1944.

In May 1990, Latvia obtained its independence after the dissolution of the Soviet Union. Mexico recognized the independence of and re-established diplomatic relations with Latvia on 27 November 1991.

In September 1993, Latvia opened an honorary consulate in Mexico City. In 2000, Mexico opened an honorary consulate in Riga. In June 2000, Mexican Foreign Undersecretary, Juan Rebolledo Gout, paid a visit Latvia and met with President Vaira Vike-Freiberga in Jūrmala.

In March 2004, Latvian President Vaira Vike-Freiberga paid a visit to Mexico to attend the European Union, Latin America and the Caribbean Summit in Guadalajara and met with President Vicente Fox. In 2007, Mexican Foreign Undersecretary Lourdes Aranda Bezaury paid a visit to Latvia to attend the third political consultations between the Ministries of Foreign Affairs of both nations. During the third political consultations, Latvia and Mexico discussed current issues related to domestic and foreign policy activities and exchanged views on global issues such as the UN reform, climate change and environmental protection, disarmament, and weapons of mass destruction.

In recent years, Foreign Ministerial meetings of both countries have been held in different international forums such as the meeting between Mexican Foreign Minister Patricia Espinosa and Latvian Foreign Minister Ģirts Valdis Kristovskis, held in the framework of the 66th General Assembly of the United Nations in September 2011. Both Foreign Ministers discussed the presence of Mexican multinational company CEMEX in Latvia and discussed climate change and the prospects for cooperation within the United Nations.

In April 2013, Latvian Foreign Vice-Minister Andris Teikmanis paid a visit to Mexico and met with his counterpart Foreign Undersecretary Carlos de Icaza. In 2023, Latvian Deputy State Secretary Andžejs Viļumsons co-chaired the Fifth Meeting for Political Consultations between Mexico and Latvia in Mexico City, along with his counterpart Foreign Undersecretary Carmen Moreno Toscano.

== High-level visits ==
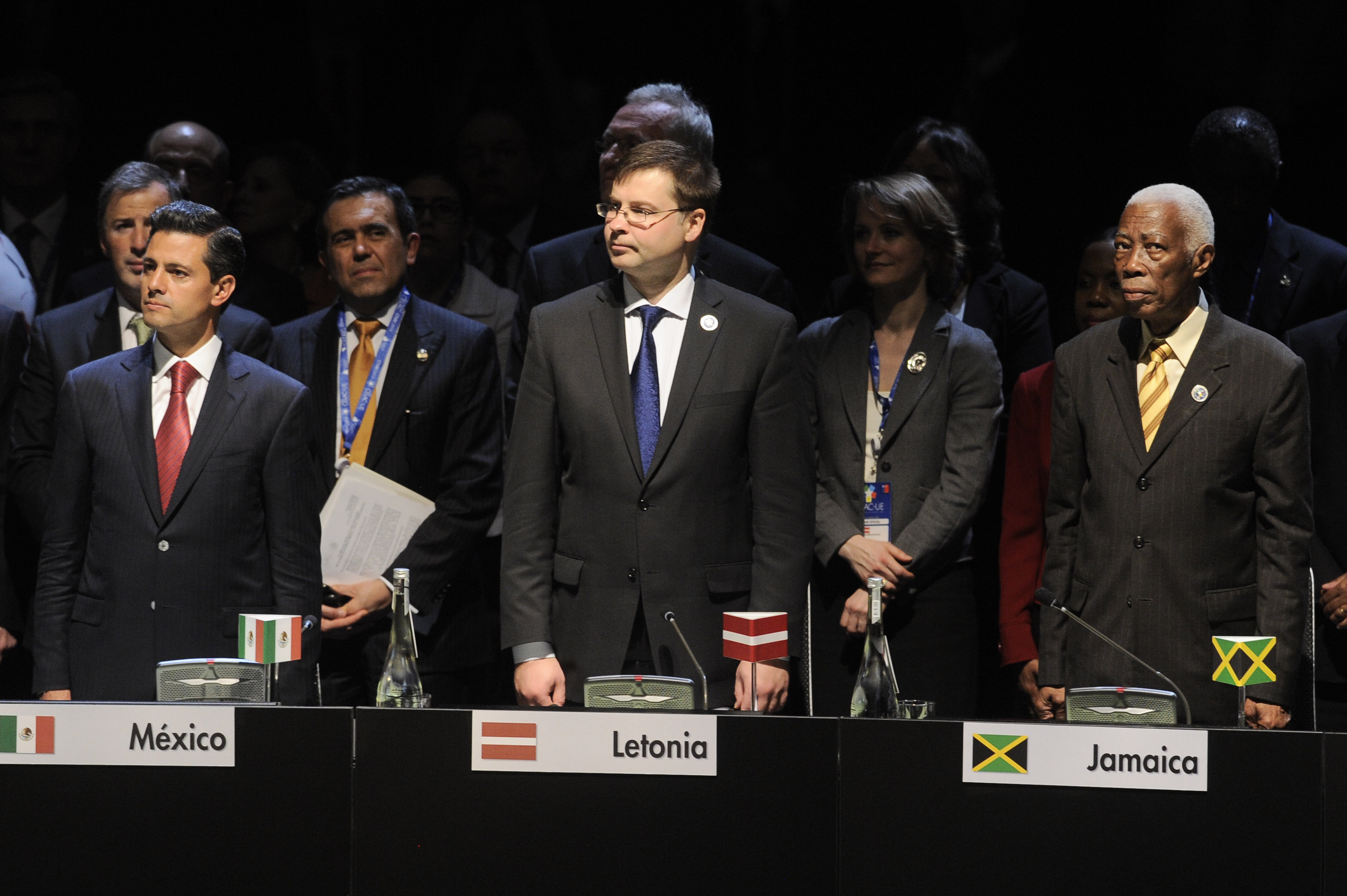
Mexican President Enrique Peña Nieto and Latvian Prime Minister Valdis Dombrovskis attending the CELAC summit in Santiago, Chile; January 2013.

High-level visits from Latvia to Mexico

- President Vaira Vike-Freiberga (2004)
- Deputy State Secretary Edgars Skuja (2006)
- Foreign Vice-Minister Andris Teikmanis (2013)
- Deputy State Secretary Andžejs Viļumsons (2023)

High-level visits from Mexico to Latvia

- Foreign Undersecretary Juan Rebolledo Gout (2000)
- Foreign Undersecretary Miguel Marin (2002)
- Foreign Undersecretary Lourdes Aranda Bezaury (2007)

== Bilateral agreements ==
Both nations have signed a few bilateral agreements such as a Memorandum of Understanding for the Establishment of a Mechanism of Bilateral Political Consultations in Matters of Common Interest (2000); Agreement on the suppression of visas for diplomatic and official passport carriers (2002); Agreement of Cooperation in the areas of Education, Culture and Sports (2005); and an Agreement to Avoid Double Taxation and Prevent Tax Evasion on Income Tax and its Protocol (2012).

== Trade ==
In 2023, trade between both nations totaled US$181 million. Latvia's main exports to Mexico include: telephones and mobile phones, electrical equipment, peat, alcohol, fiberglass, chemical based products, motor vehicles for special uses, wires and ropes, and plastic articles. Mexico's main exports to Latvia include: lead minerals and their concentrates, fiberglass, alcohol (beer), pepper, fruits and nuts, and coffee. Latvian company Zabbix operates in Mexico.

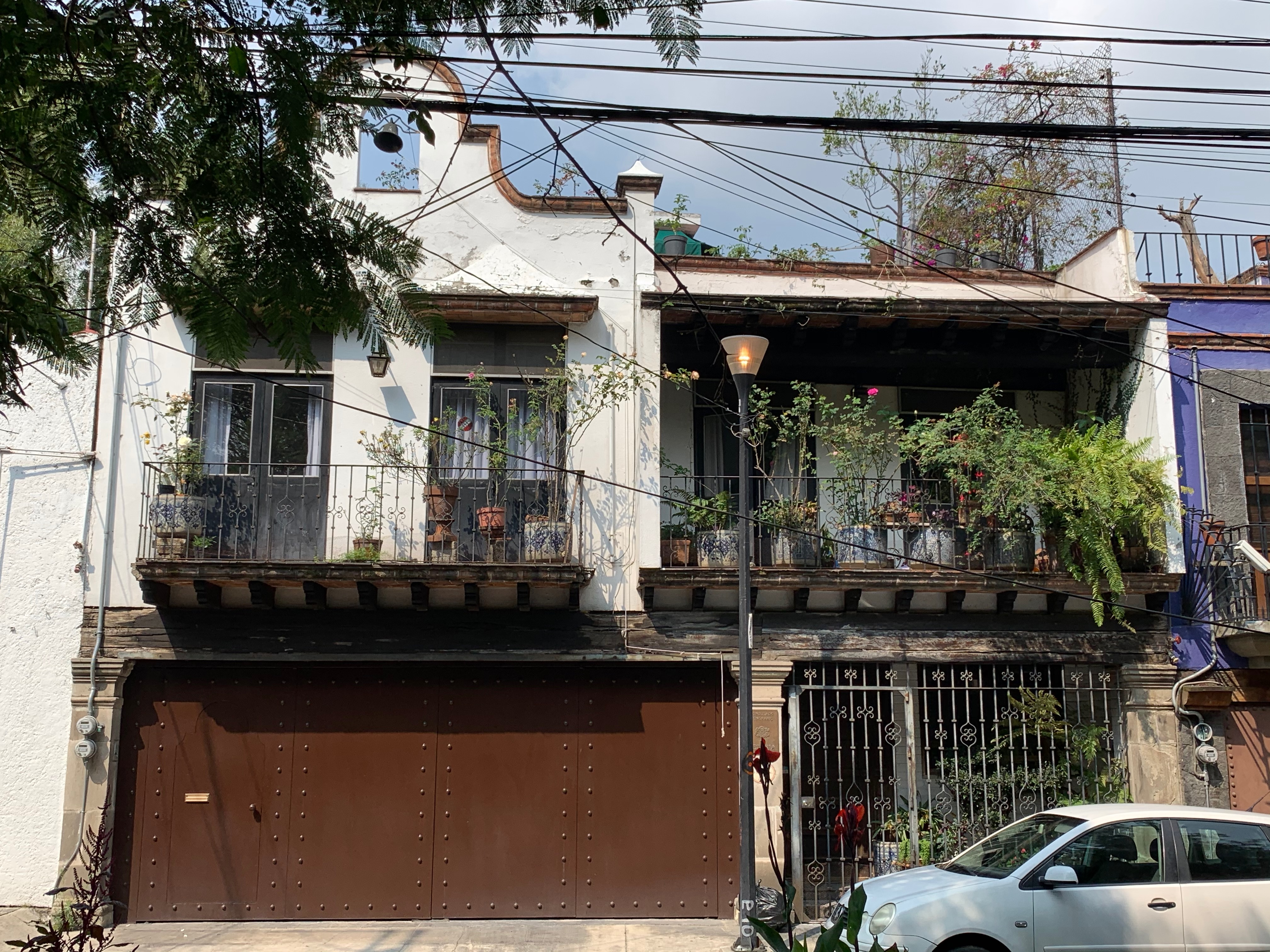
Honorary consulate of Latvia in Mexico City

== Diplomatic missions ==
Neither country has a resident ambassador.

- Latvia is accredited to Mexico from its embassy in Washington, D.C., United States and maintains an honorary consulate in Mexico City.
- Mexico is accredited to Latvia from its embassy in Stockholm, Sweden and maintains an honorary consulate in Riga.

== See also ==
- Foreign relations of Latvia
- Foreign relations of Mexico
