= China–Latvia relations =

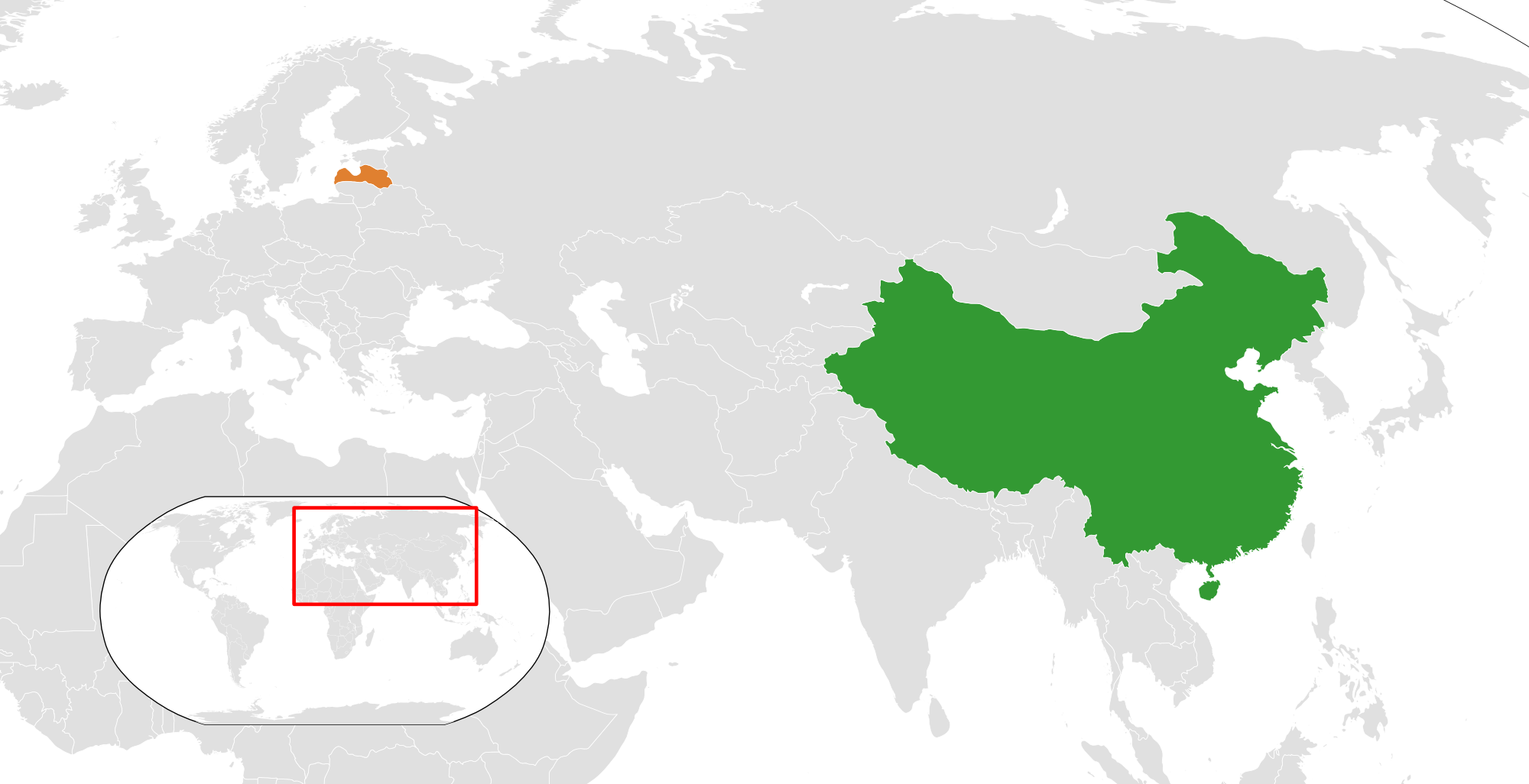

- China: Latvia

Diplomatic mission
- Latvian Embassy, Beijing: Chinese Embassy, Riga

China–Latvia relations refers to the bilateral relations between the People's Republic of China and the Republic of Latvia.

== History ==
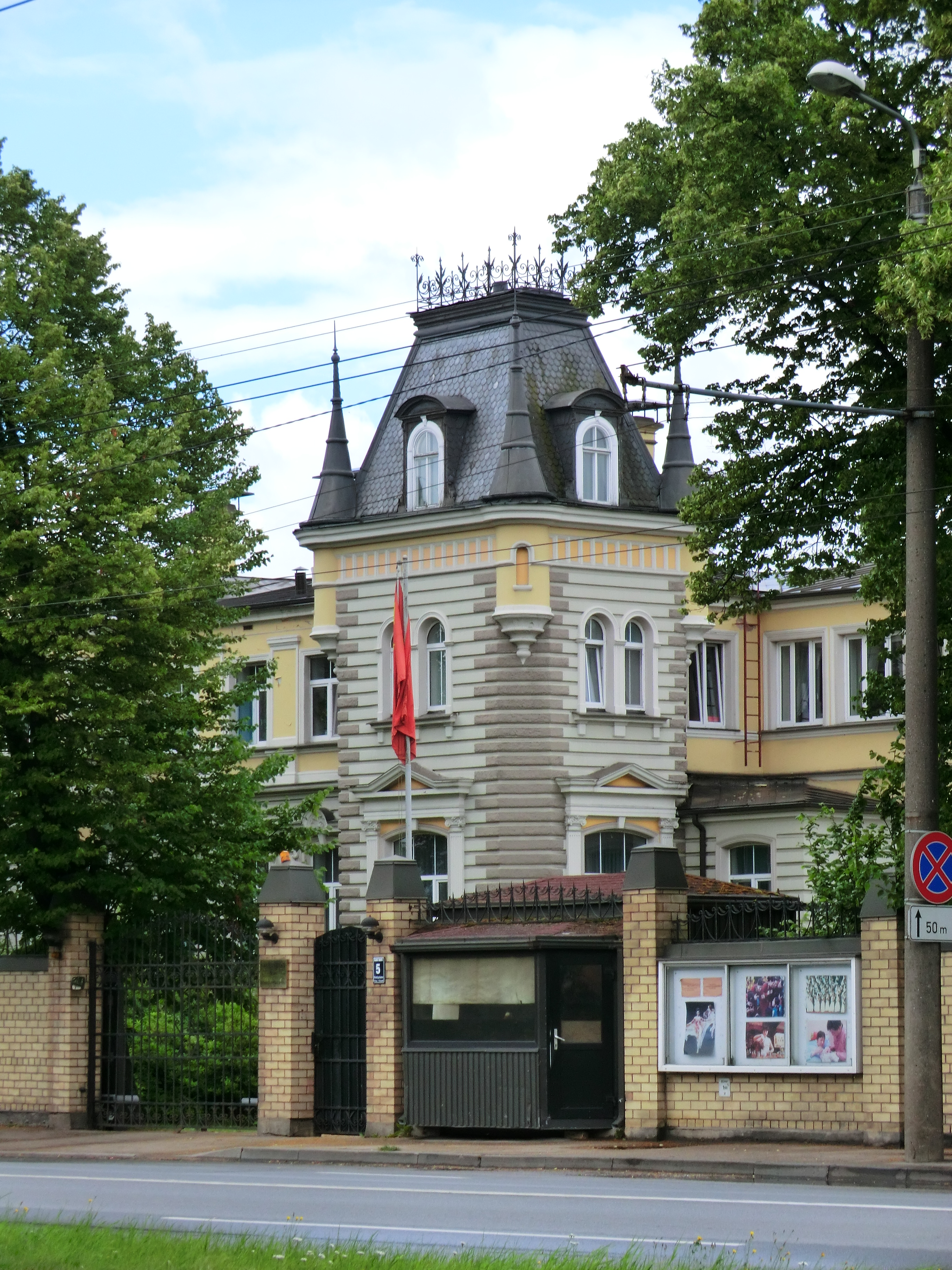
Embassy of China in Riga

=== 1940s to 1990s ===
During World War II, over 100 Latvians went to China to participate in the war against Japan.

Once a territory of the Soviet Union, the restoration of Latvia's independence was announced by the Supreme Soviet of the Latvian Soviet Socialist Republic on August 22, 1991. After the Soviet State Council recognized the independence of the three Baltic countries, including Latvia, the People's Republic of China also recognized the independence of these countries on September 7 of the same year and sent Tian Zengpei, then Deputy Minister of Foreign Affairs, to visit these three countries.

The next day, the People's Republic of China sent representatives to the three Baltic countries to negotiate the establishment of diplomatic relations with them. The representatives first went to the Chinese Consulate General in Leningrad (now St. Petersburg), borrowed two cars from the Consulate General, and went first to Estonia, then to Latvia and Lithuania. At that time, the three Baltic countries had just become independent, so they were very willing to be recognized by foreign countries, and the process of establishing diplomatic relations with the People's Republic of China was generally smooth. The three Baltic countries did not agree to write the communiqué on the establishment of diplomatic relations in Russian, but at that time no one in these countries could read or write Chinese, and no one in the People's Republic of China could understand their language. The People's Republic of China had long anticipated this, so it specially transferred a secretary from the Chinese Embassy in the United Kingdom to translate the communiqué on the establishment of diplomatic relations, which was drafted in Chinese, into English.

On September 12, 1991, the People's Republic of China and Latvia established diplomatic relations. In the communiqué on the establishment of diplomatic relations between the People's Republic of China and the three Baltic countries, there was a lot of space on the Taiwan issue. In the communiqué on the establishment of diplomatic relations, Latvia recognized that there is only one China in the world and that Taiwan is a part of China. It also recognized that the People's Republic of China is the only legitimate Chinese government.

In January 1992, Chang Hsiao-yen, Deputy Minister of Foreign Affairs of the Republic of China, visited the three Baltic countries and established diplomatic relations with Latvia at the consul general level, but did not formally establish diplomatic relations. Latvia signed a document with the Republic of China, expressing its recognition of Taiwan as a sovereign and independent country and its jurisdiction over the Taiwan, Penghu, Kinmen and Matsu regions. Later, the Republic of China established a consulate general in Riga, the capital of Latvia. After the Republic of China established a consulate general in Latvia, the People's Republic of China issued a statement announcing the withdrawal of its embassy in Latvia, but did not sever diplomatic relations with the country. At the same time, the People's Republic of China decided to enhance relations between Latvia's neighboring countries and China to prevent similar incidents from happening again.

In July 1994, the Latvian government sent a representative to the People's Republic of China, promising to sever consular relations with the Republic of China and to sign a joint communiqué with the People's Republic of China on the normalization of relations between the two countries. The Republic of China's diplomatic mission in Latvia was also renamed the "Taipei Mission".

=== 2010s to present ===
Latvia joined the Belt and Road Initiative (BRI) in 2016 and withdrew in 2022 due to China's support for Russia's invasion of Ukraine.

However, in December 2019, Latvia's national security department included China in its national threat assessment report for the first time, and stated that it was necessary to pay more attention to China's activities in the country. In June 2020, Latvia openly opposed the Hong Kong national security law. In 2023, because Chinese Ambassador to France Lu Shaye claimed in an interview with France 1 News that the sovereignty of former Soviet countries including Latvia was "undetermined", the Latvian Foreign Minister lodged a formal protest with China and summoned the Acting Charge d'Affaires of the Chinese Embassy in Latvia to express his dissatisfaction.

== Economic relations ==
China and Latvia had trade relations before the establishment of modern diplomatic relations between the two countries. In 1960, mainland China imported a batch of Latvian brown cattle from the Latvian SSR, of which, 30 cattle were distributed to Hunan.

According to data on the website of the Center for the Study of Economic Complexity, exports from mainland China to Latvia rose to a high of over US$400 million in 2007–2008. Although it fell back slightly afterwards, it continued to rise from 2010 to 2012. In 2012, mainland China exported US$554 million to Latvia, with the largest amount of goods being machinery and equipment. Latvia's exports to mainland China rose from over US$40 million the previous year to over US$70 million in 2011, but then fell back. In 2012, Latvia exported less than US$70 million to mainland China.

== Cultural relations ==
The cultural contact between Latvia and China can be traced back, before the establishment of the two countries in modern times. Born in Latvia in 1869, Peter Petrovich Schmidt was a sinologist who studied Chinese, Manchu and Mongolian. After graduating from university, he came to China for further studies; he stayed in China for three years, during which time he met some sinologists from Europe and recorded what he saw and heard in detail, often sending his articles to Russia for publication. After that, Schmidt taught Chinese and Manchu in Russian universities and wrote the book "An Experiment in Mandarin Grammar".

Latvia is considered a center for Sinology research in the Baltic countries. Many local universities offer Chinese courses. The People's Republic of China has also provided teachers, scholarships and teaching materials for Chinese teaching units in Latvia. Before the People's Republic of China sent teachers to Latvia, there were teachers from Taiwan teaching Chinese in Latvia. The University of Latvia has a Confucius Institute, which provides free Chinese teaching to students of the University of Latvia, while non-Latvian students have to pay tuition. This Confucius Institute mainly teaches Chinese and Chinese culture, and outstanding students have the opportunity to receive scholarships to study in China. Universities in China such as Beijing Foreign Studies University, Beijing International Studies University, and other universities also have Latvian language majors.

Schools in Hong Kong and Latvia have had exchange students in each other's universities, and Hong Kong universities also have professors from Latvia.

== Resident diplomatic missions ==
- China has an embassy in Riga.
- Latvia has an embassy in Beijing.

== See also ==
- Foreign relations of China
- Foreign relations of Latvia
