= Latvia–Ukraine relations =

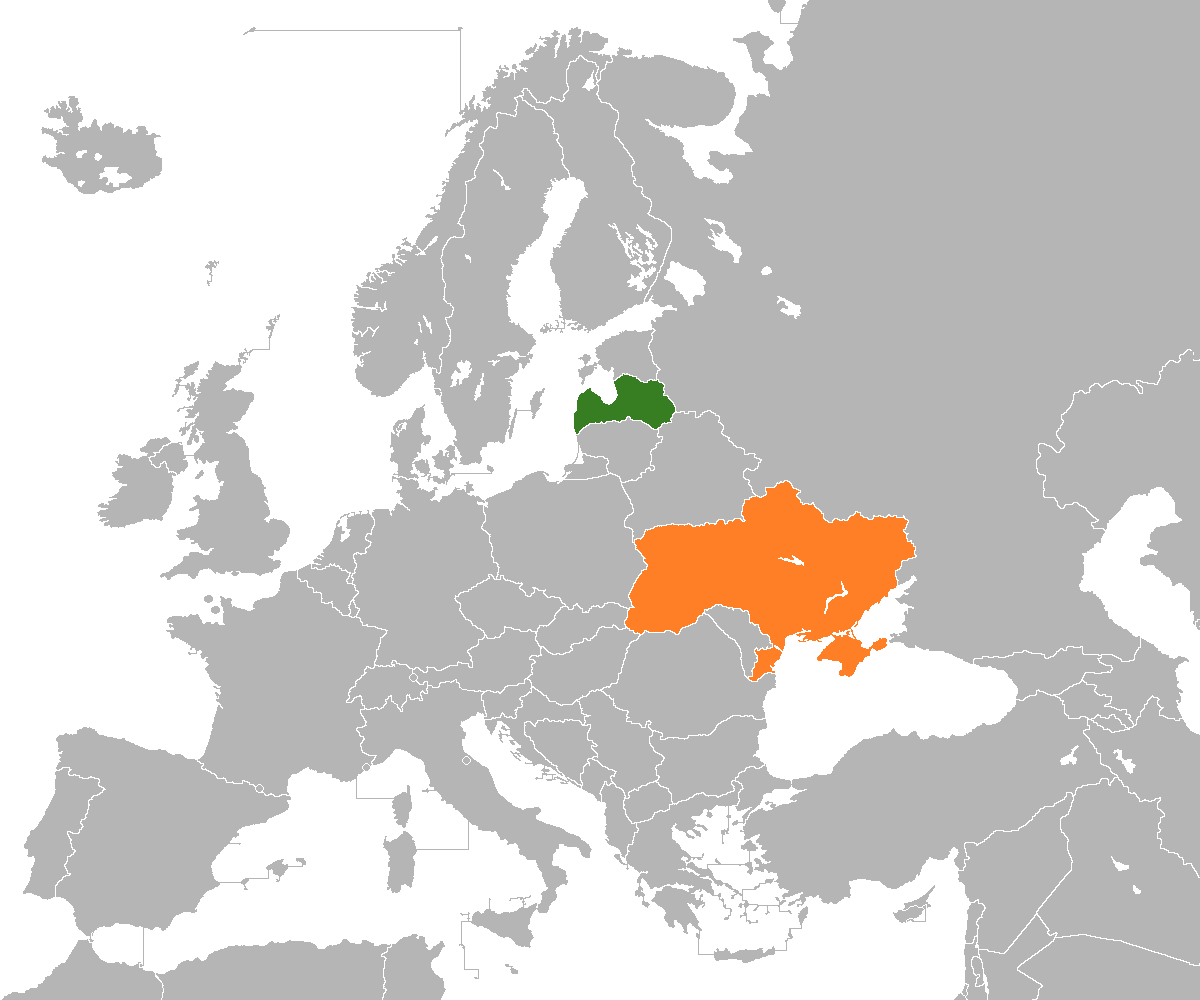

- Latvia: Ukraine

Latvia–Ukraine relations refer to the diplomatic relations between Latvia and Ukraine. Bilateral relations between Latvia and Ukraine have remained consistently strong, driven by shared concerns over Russian expansionism. As a member of the European Union, Latvia supports Ukraine’s EU accession efforts following its 2022 application. Both nations are also full members of the Council of Europe.

== History ==
Until the aftermath of the First World War, both countries were part of the Russian Empire. Diplomatic relations between the Ukrainian People's Republic and the Republic of Latvia were established in 1918. Subsequently, Ukraine was subsumed into the Soviet Union by 1922, while Latvia was occupied by the Soviet Union in 1940. Both countries re-established diplomatic relations on February 12, 1992.

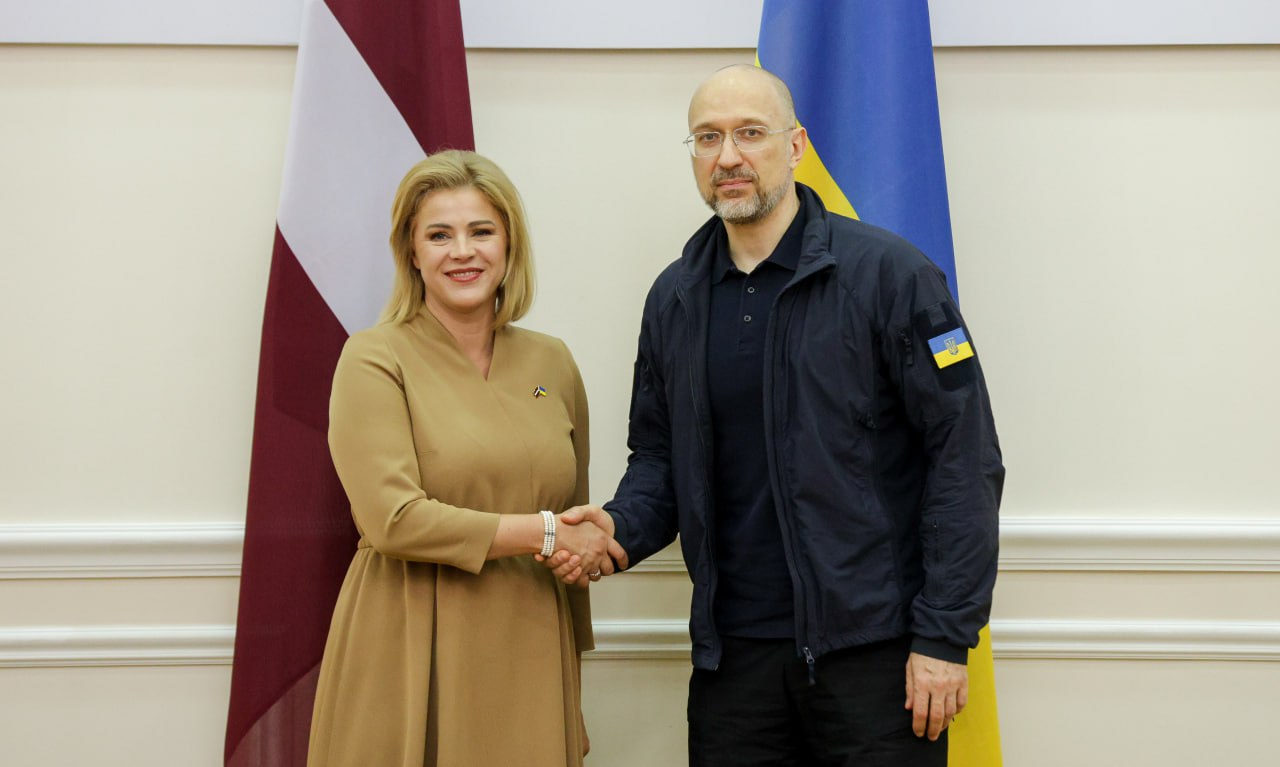
Latvian Prime Minister Evika Siliņa and Ukrainian Prime Minister Denys Shmyhal meet in 2024

=== Russian Invasion of Ukraine ===
In January 2022, during the prelude to the Russian invasion of Ukraine, Latvia announced it would send FIM-92 Stinger air defense systems to Ukraine. The air defense systems were delivered in February 2022, shortly before the Russian invasion of Ukraine. Latvia immediately condemned the Russian invasion of Ukraine during its first hours, declared its readiness to accept Ukrainian refugees and suspended the issuance of Latvian visas to Russian citizens.

In April 2024, Latvia pledged to supply Ukraine with domestically produced drones worth €1 million as part of its ongoing military assistance. As a participant in the Drone Coalition, Latvia committed to allocating at least €10 million throughout the year to support Ukraine with drone-related aid, including production, procurement, and training.

Since the start of Russia's full-scale invasion, Latvia has provided nearly €860 million in aid to Ukraine. This includes €540 million in military assistance, €225 million to support Ukrainian civilians in Latvia, €82 million in humanitarian aid, and €12 million for reconstruction efforts.

Latvia has pledged to continue its military support, committing at least 0.25% of its GDP to Ukraine aid in both 2025 and 2026. Latvia plans to deliver 42 domestically produced Patria AWVs to Ukraine by 2025 in addition to providing various forms of assistance, including long-term support beyond a potential ceasefire.

== Trade ==
In 2023, bilateral trade between Latvia and Ukraine totaled approximately $652 million, with Latvia exporting around $318 million in goods to Ukraine and importing roughly $334 million from Ukraine.

Latvia's primary exports to Ukraine included video recording equipment ($42.5M), petroleum gas ($30.7M), and refined petroleum ($24.2M). Conversely, Ukraine mainly exported plastic products ($37.8M), rapeseed ($34.5M), and processed egg products ($14.6M) to Latvia.

Since 2018, Latvia’s exports to Ukraine have grown at an annualized rate of 17%, increasing from $145 million to $318 million in 2023. Similarly, Ukraine’s exports to Latvia have increased at an annualized rate of 2.65%, from $286 million in 2018 to $334 million in 2023.

== Resident diplomatic missions ==
- Latvia has an embassy in Kyiv.
- Ukraine has an embassy in Riga.
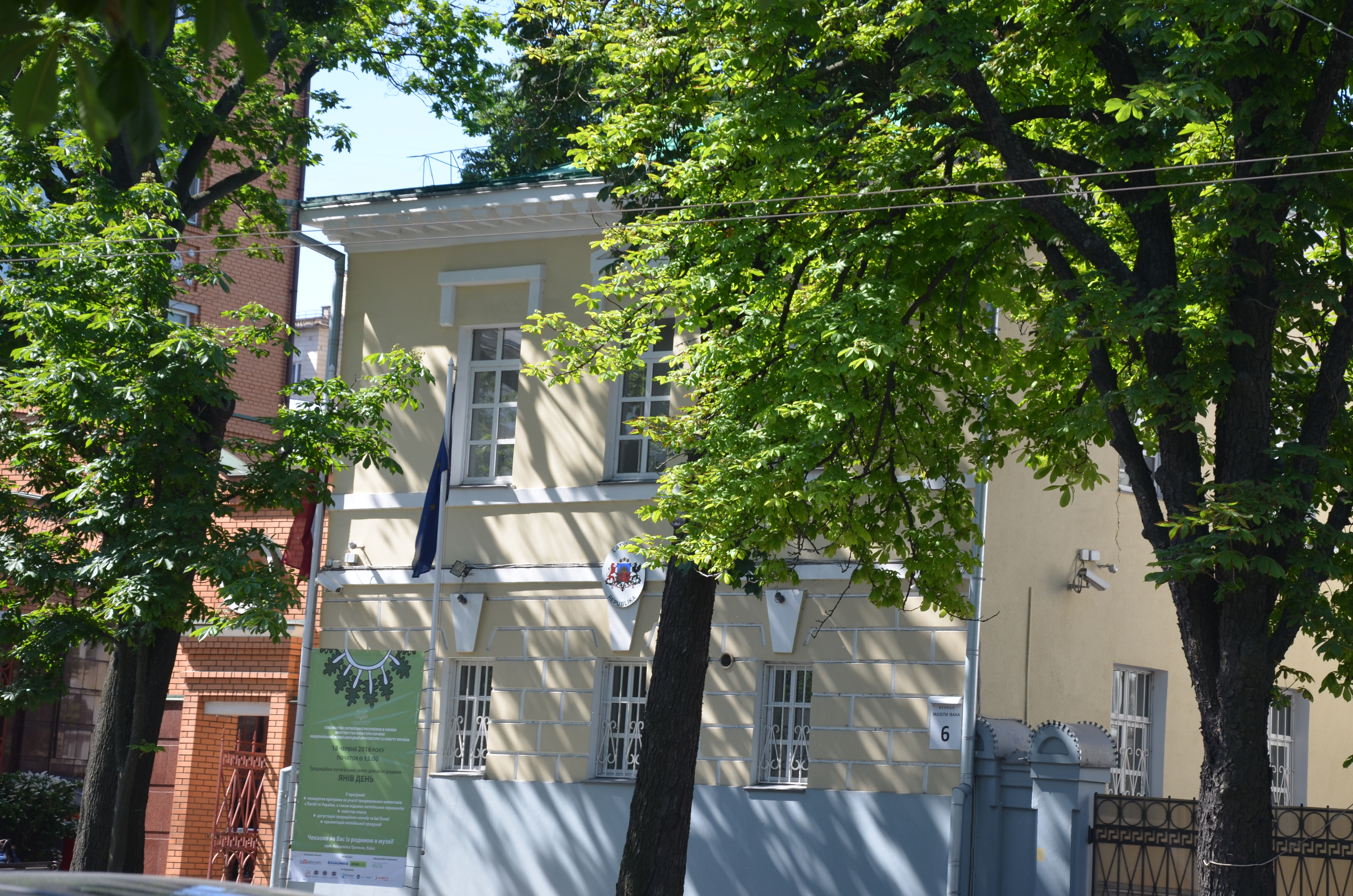
Embassy of Latvia in Kyiv

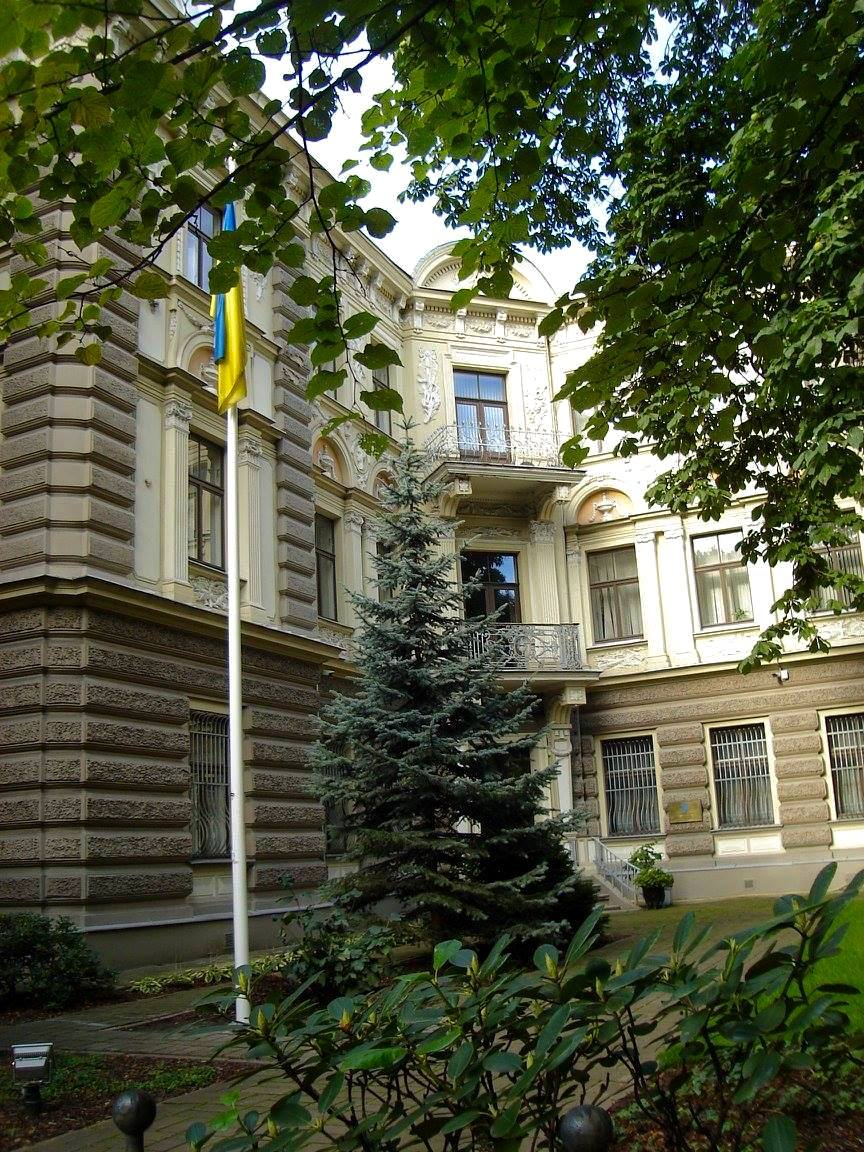
Embassy of Ukraine in Riga

== See also ==
- Foreign relations of Latvia
- Foreign relations of Ukraine
- Ukrainians in Latvia (in Finnish)
- Latvians in Ukraine
- Ukraine–EU relations
  - Accession of Ukraine to the EU
