= Iceland–Latvia relations =

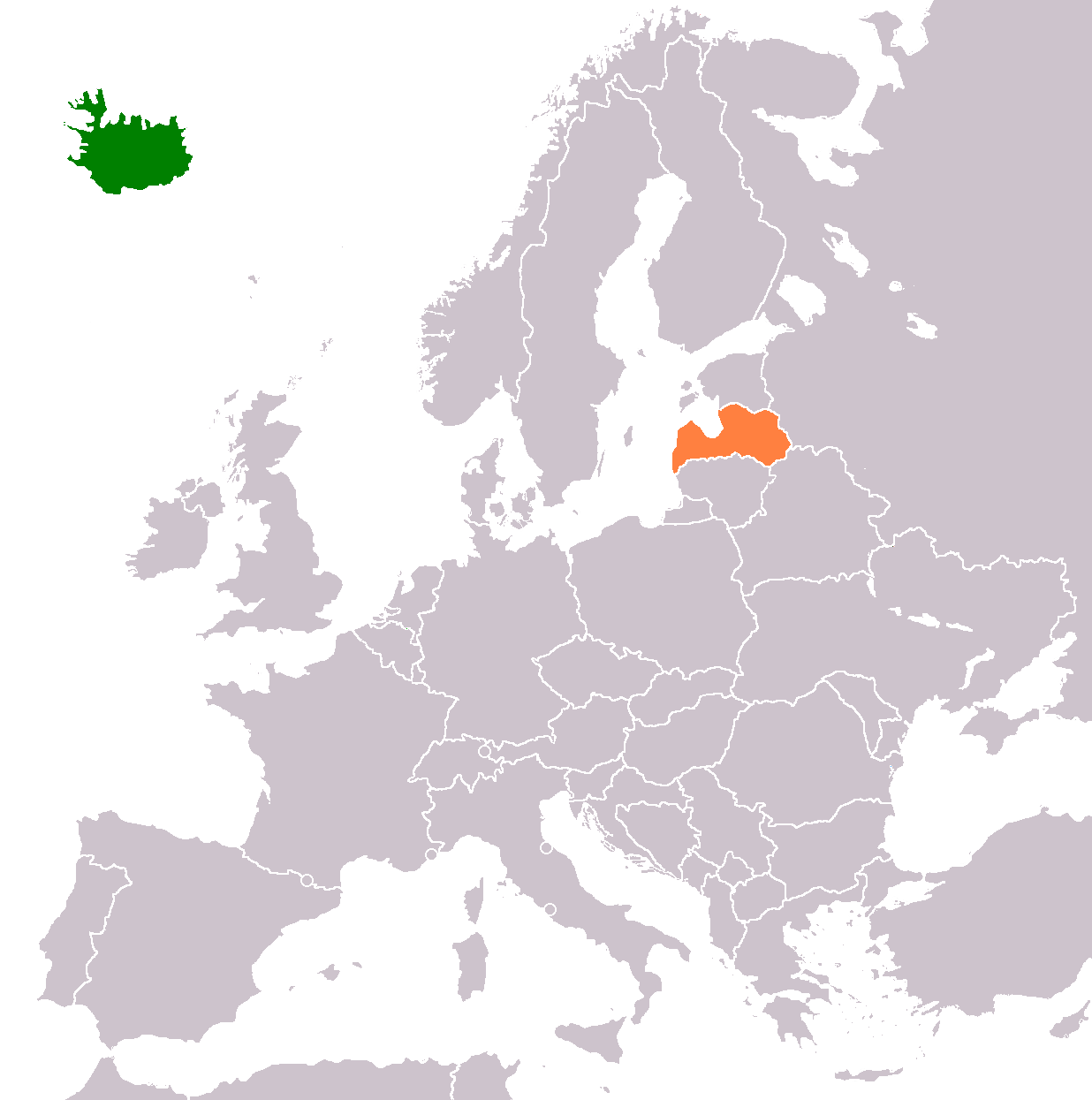

- Iceland: Latvia

Iceland–Latvia relations are the bilateral relations between Iceland and Latvia. Iceland was the first country to recognize the independence of Latvia in August 1991. Both countries re-established diplomatic relations on 22 August 1991. Neither country has a resident ambassador. Iceland is represented in Latvia through its embassy in Helsinki, Finland. Latvia is represented in Iceland through its embassy in Oslo, Norway.

Both countries are full members of the Council of the Baltic Sea States, NATO, Council of Europe and the Joint Expeditionary Force. Additionally, they are both part of the Nordic-Baltic Eight.

== History ==
On 9 October 2000, Indulis Bērziņš, Minister of Foreign Affairs of Latvia, and Kornelius Sigmundsson, Ambassador of the Republic of Iceland to Latvia signed the Agreement between the Government of the Republic of Latvia and the Government of the Republic of Iceland on Co-operation in the Field of Tourism. Bērziņš pointed out that "this is a new sign in the co-operation between Latvia and Iceland" and expressed the support to Latvia's participation in the NATO and integration into the EU. He also positively evaluated co-operation between Iceland and Latvia in the framework of the United Nations.

In 2006, Icelandair acquired LatCharter Airlines.

In January 2009, Latvian President Valdis Zatlers presented letters of accreditation to Latvia's new ambassador extraordinary and plenipotentiary to Iceland, Andris Sekacis noting the close and friendly bilateral relationship between Latvia and Iceland which has remained in place since 1991, when Iceland was the first foreign country in the world to recognize Latvia's independence. The President expressed his hope that Sekacis will make a major investment in ensuring that the relationship between Latvia and Iceland continues to be successful.

== High level visits ==
=== High-level visits from Iceland to Latvia ===
- May 24 to May 27, 2000, official visit to Latvia by the prime minister of Iceland Davíð Oddsson.
- September 8, 2008 the Icelandic Minister for Foreign Affairs, Ingibjörg Sólrún Gísladóttir, had a working visit to Latvia. She had meetings with Maris Riekstins and also several Icelandic companies in Riga.

=== High-level visits from Latvia to Iceland ===
- April 19, 1999, Guntis Ulmanis, the President of Latvia held a meeting with Olafur Ragnar Grimsson, the President of Iceland in Reykjavík.
- August 11 to August 13, 2002, State visit to Iceland by Vaira Vīķe-Freiberga, the Latvian President.
- October 24, 2005, visit to Iceland by the Prime Minister of Latvia, Aigars Kalvītis
- June 7 and June 8, 2006, visit to Iceland by Aigars Kalvītis, the Prime Minister of Latvia.

== Diplomatic missions ==
Neither country has a resident ambassador.

- Iceland is accredited to Latvia from its embassy in Helsinki, Finland.
- Latvia is accredited to Iceland from its embassy in Oslo, Norway.

== See also ==
- Foreign relations of Iceland
- Foreign relations of Latvia
- Iceland-EU relations
- NATO-EU relations
