= Latvia–Spain relations =

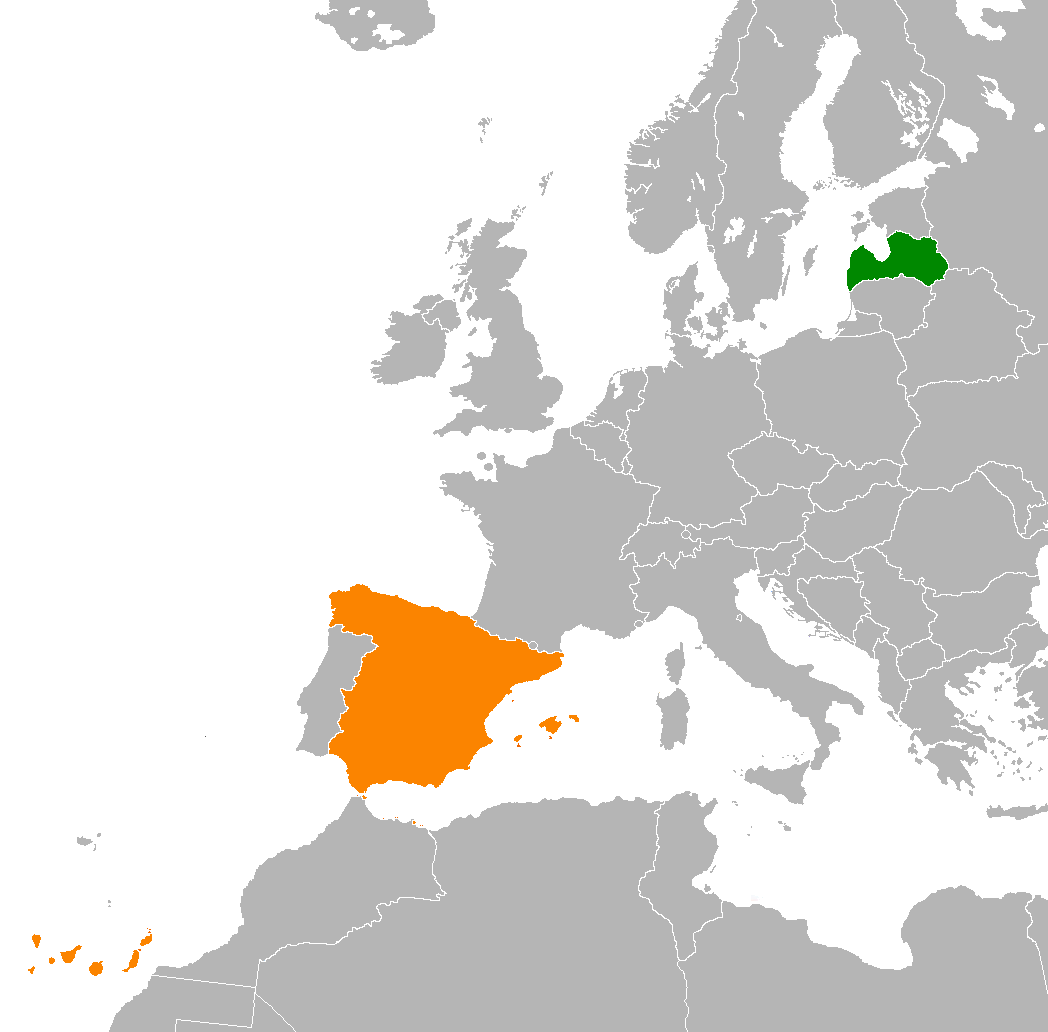

- Latvia: Spain

Latvia–Spain relations are the bilateral relations between Latvia and Spain. Both countries are full members of the Council of Europe, the European Union and NATO.

== Diplomatic missions ==
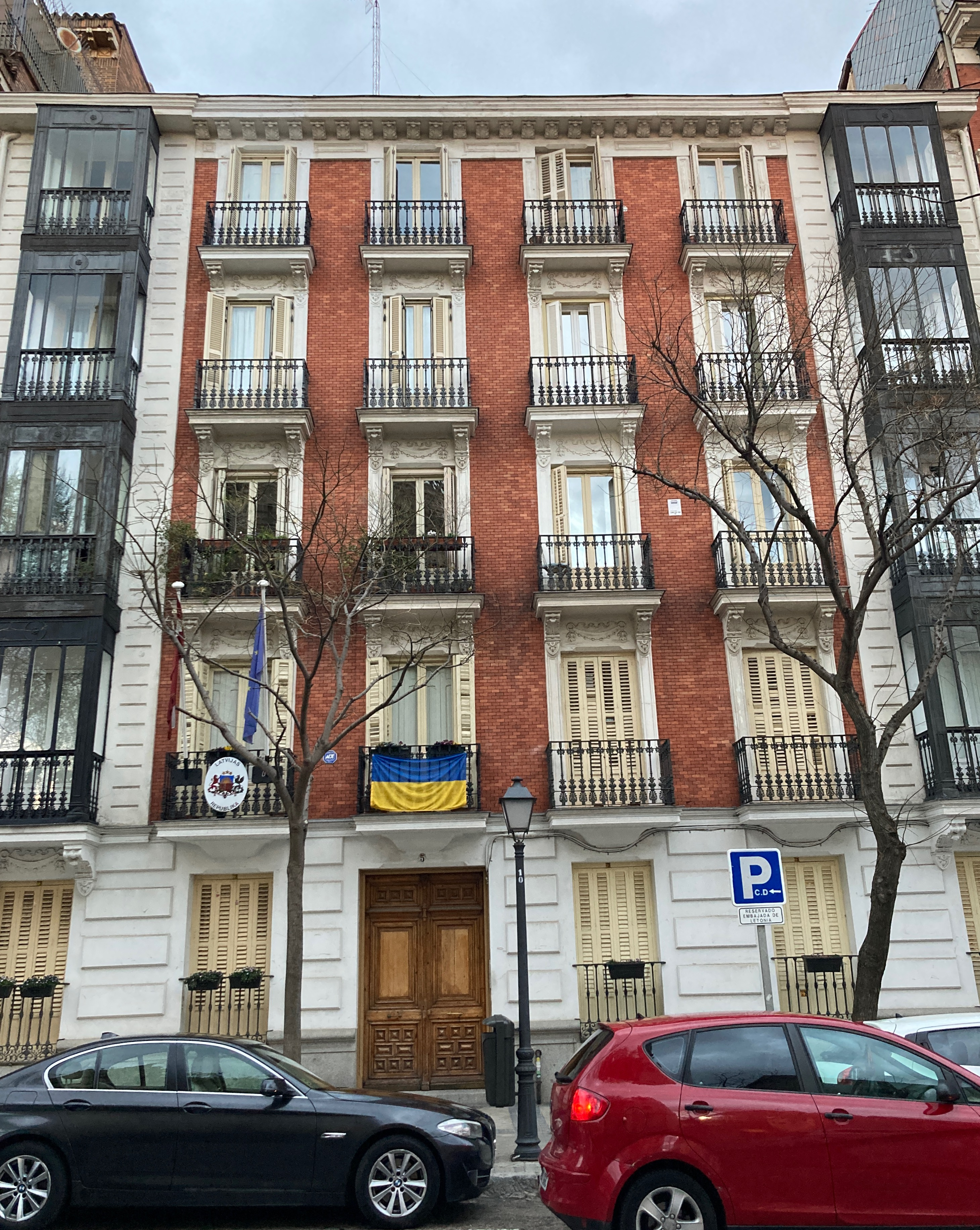
Embassy of Latvia in Madrid

Latvia has an embassy in Madrid. Formal representation of Spain in Latvia is limited to the embassy office in Riga.

== History ==
Historical relations between Spain and Latvia began during the first period of independence, and were re-established in October 1991.

Since Latvia's entry into the EU and NATO, relations with Spain have seen positive developments, including the opening of the Spanish Embassy in Riga in 2004, and Latvia's Diplomatic Representation in Madrid.

In 2009, Latvian representatives visited Spain, which culminated a first stage of bilateral approach.

== Cultural relations ==
While Latvia is not subject to Official Spanish Development Assistance, cooperation in the cultural and educational field is growing. Several Spanish universities have signed agreements with counterparts in Latvia, and the number of Erasmus students in Spain continues to grow. The AECID finances two lectorates in each University of Latvia.

Spanish artists travel to Riga to participate in major dance or music festivals, as part of Latvia's cultural programming.

The Latvian Academy of Culture teaches a degree of specialization in Spanish language and culture. The University of Latvia teaches a master's degree in Romanesque Studies, both with the support of the AECID's lecturer program.

== See also ==
- Foreign relations of Latvia
- Foreign relations of Spain
- NATO-EU relations
