= Albania–Latvia relations =

- Albania: Latvia

Albania–Latvia relations are the bilateral relations between Albania and Latvia. Both countries are members of NATO, the Council of Europe and the Organization for Security and Co-operation in Europe. The diplomatic relations between Latvia and Albania were first established on 16 February 1928 and subsequently reinstated on 28 August 1991. Albania has a non resident ambassador in Warsaw. Latvia has a non resident ambassador in Rome.

Latvia is a strong supporter of Albania's aspirations to become a member of the EU and values Albania's contribution to NATO's Multinational Battle Group in Latvia.

== Trade relations ==
In 2023, trade between Albania and Latvia continued to grow, with Albania exporting $3.57M—mainly citrus, cabbages, and perfume plants—and Latvia exporting $2.75M, including broadcasting equipment and packaged medicaments. Over the past five years, Albanian exports to Latvia rose by an annualized rate of 56.3%, while Latvian exports to Albania increased by 23.4%.

== Bilateral agreements ==
On 3 April 2025, officials from Albania and Latvia concluded negotiations by formally agreeing on a social security agreement, the first of its kind between the two countries and a significant step toward enhancing bilateral cooperation.

== High level visits ==
On 3 September 2024, Latvian President Edgars Rinkēvičs met with the President of Albania, Bajram Begaj, as part of his official visit to Latvia. This was the inaugural visit by an Albanian President to Latvia.

== Resident diplomatic missions ==
- Albania is accredited to Latvia from its embassy in Warsaw, Poland.
- Latvia is accredited to Albania from its embassy in Rome, Italy.

== See also ==
- Foreign relations of Albania
- Foreign relations of Latvia
