= Israel–Latvia relations =

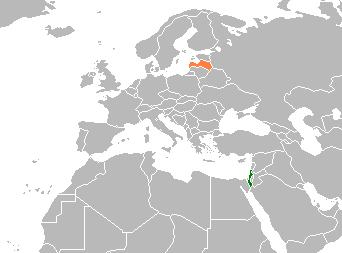

- Israel: Latvia

Israel–Latvia relations are foreign relations between Israel and Latvia. Israel recognized Latvia's independence in 1991. Both countries established diplomatic relations in 1992. Israel opened embassy in Riga in October 1992, and Latvia opened embassy in Tel Aviv in 1995.

Latvia is home to 4,500 Jews.

== Visits ==
Year	Visit	Note
1996	The Latvian President Guntis Ulmanis visits Israel	The first Latvian President to visit Israel
2005	The Israeli President Moshe Katsav visits Latvia	The first Israeli President to visit Latvia
2006	The Latvian President Vaira Vike-Freiberga visits Israel	
2013	The Israeli President Shimon Peres visits Latvia	
2017	The Speaker of the Knesset Yuli-Yoel Edelstein visit Latvia	
2020	The Saeima speaker Inara Murniece visits Israel	Participates in the commemoration of the 75th anniversary of the liberation of Auschwitz.
2022	The Latvian President Egils Levits visits Israel	

== Trade ==
Israel and Latvia trade is also influenced by the EU - Israel Free Trade Agreement from 1995.

Israel - Latvia trade in millions USD-$
	Israel imports Latvia exports	Latvia imports Israel exports	Total trade value
2023	58.4	30	88.4
2022	67.9	40.2	108.1
2021	65.1	33.6	98.7
2020	64.4	24.4	88.8
2019	51.1	28.1	79.2
2018	49.8	33.2	83
2017	50.6	29.9	80.5
2016	42	25.6	67.6
2015	37.6	40.1	77.7
2014	33.8	50.7	84.5
2013	31.7	60.2	91.9
2012	166.5	55.1	221.6
2011	68.2	47.7	115.9
2010	47.5	33.1	80.6
2009	100.6	25.3	125.9
2008	319.4	33.9	353.3
2007	258.8	32.5	291.3
2006	9.3	33.3	42.6
2005	6.7	21.4	28.1
2004	4.3	14.8	19.1
2003	4.1	13.9	18
2002	2.4	11.5	13.9

== Tourism ==
Since 2001 Israel and Latvia abolished the need for visa to travel.

Tourism from Latvia in Israel and tourists from Israel in Latvia
	2023	2022	2021	2020	2019	2018	2017
Tourists from Latvia Arriving to Israel	5,200	4,300	600	2,600	12,900	14,200	13,200
Tourists from Israel Arriving to Latvia	10,703	9,900	3,098	1,166	15,780	20,268	18,843

== See also ==
- Foreign relations of Israel
- Foreign relations of Latvia
- History of the Jews in Latvia
