= Latvia–Serbia relations =

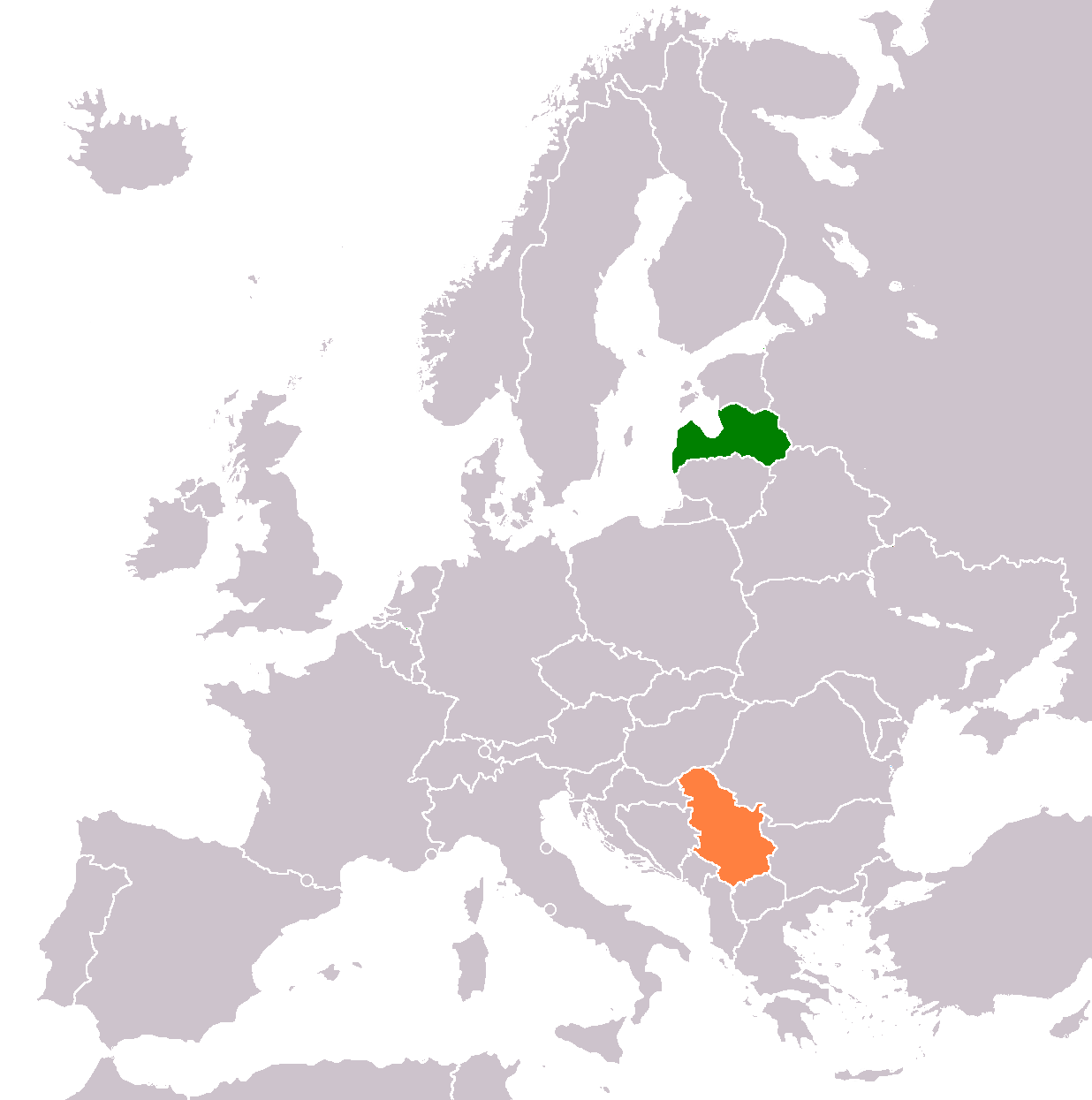

- Latvia: Serbia

Latvia and Serbia maintain diplomatic relations established in 1917. The Soviet Union maintained relations with the Socialist Federal Republic of Yugoslavia until the dissolution and breakup of both countries in 1991. Following its independence, Latvia established relations with Federal Republic of Yugoslavia (later Serbia and Montenegro) of which Serbia is considered sole successor.

== Political relations ==
Latvia supports Serbia's EU ascension.

== Economic relations ==
Trade between two countries amounted to nearly $33 million in 2023; Serbian merchandise exports to Latvia were standing at over $20 million; Latvia's export to Serbia were about $13 million.

== Resident diplomatic missions ==
- Latvia is represented in Serbia through its embassy in Athens, Greece.
- Serbia has an embassy in Riga.

== See also ==
- Foreign relations of Latvia
- Foreign relations of Serbia
- Soviet Union–Yugoslavia relations
