= Honorary Consulate of Latvia, Lviv =

Coordinates: 49.86851°N 24.05754°E

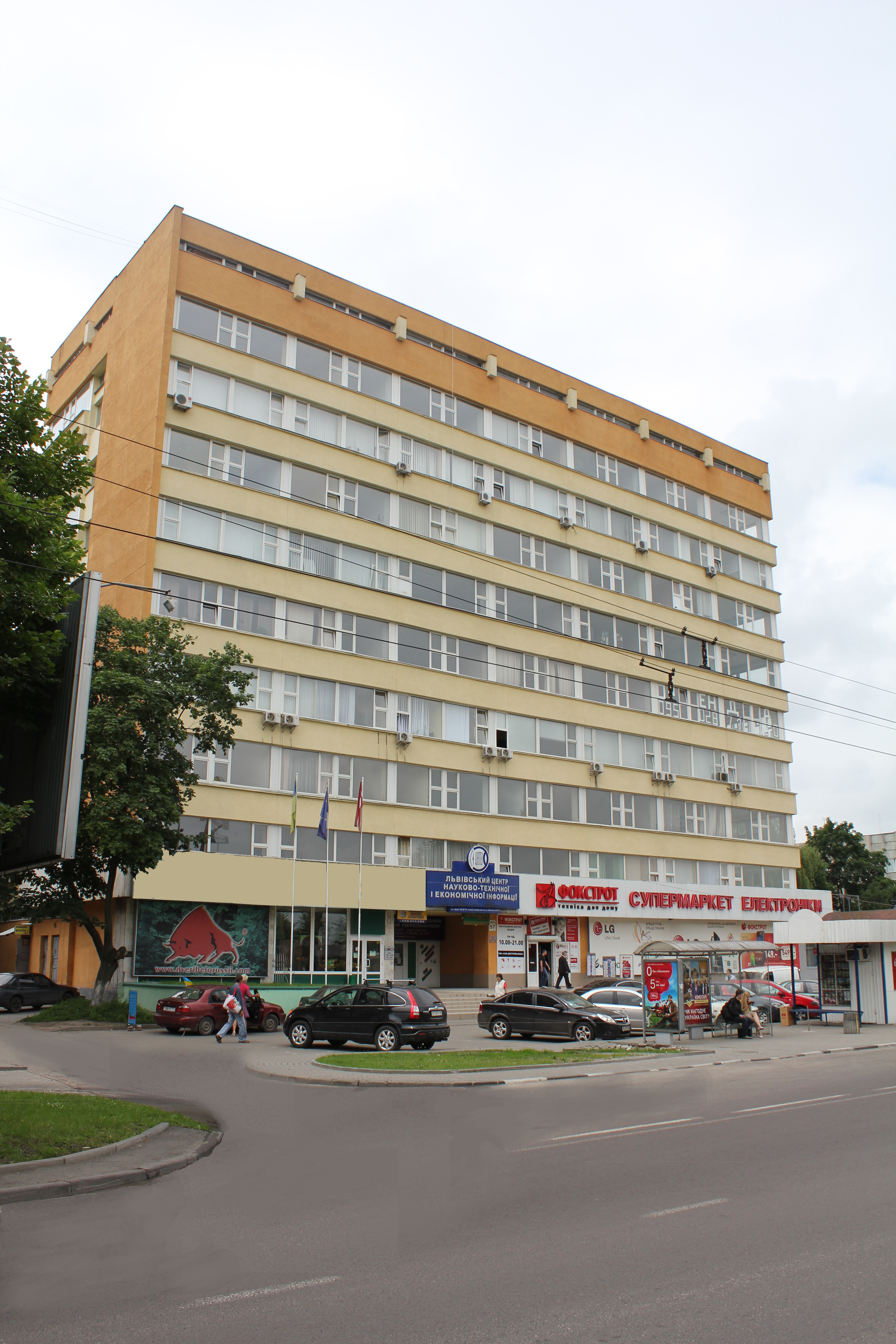
Building at 57 Chornovil Ave., where the Honorary Consulate of the Republic of Latvia in Lviv is located.

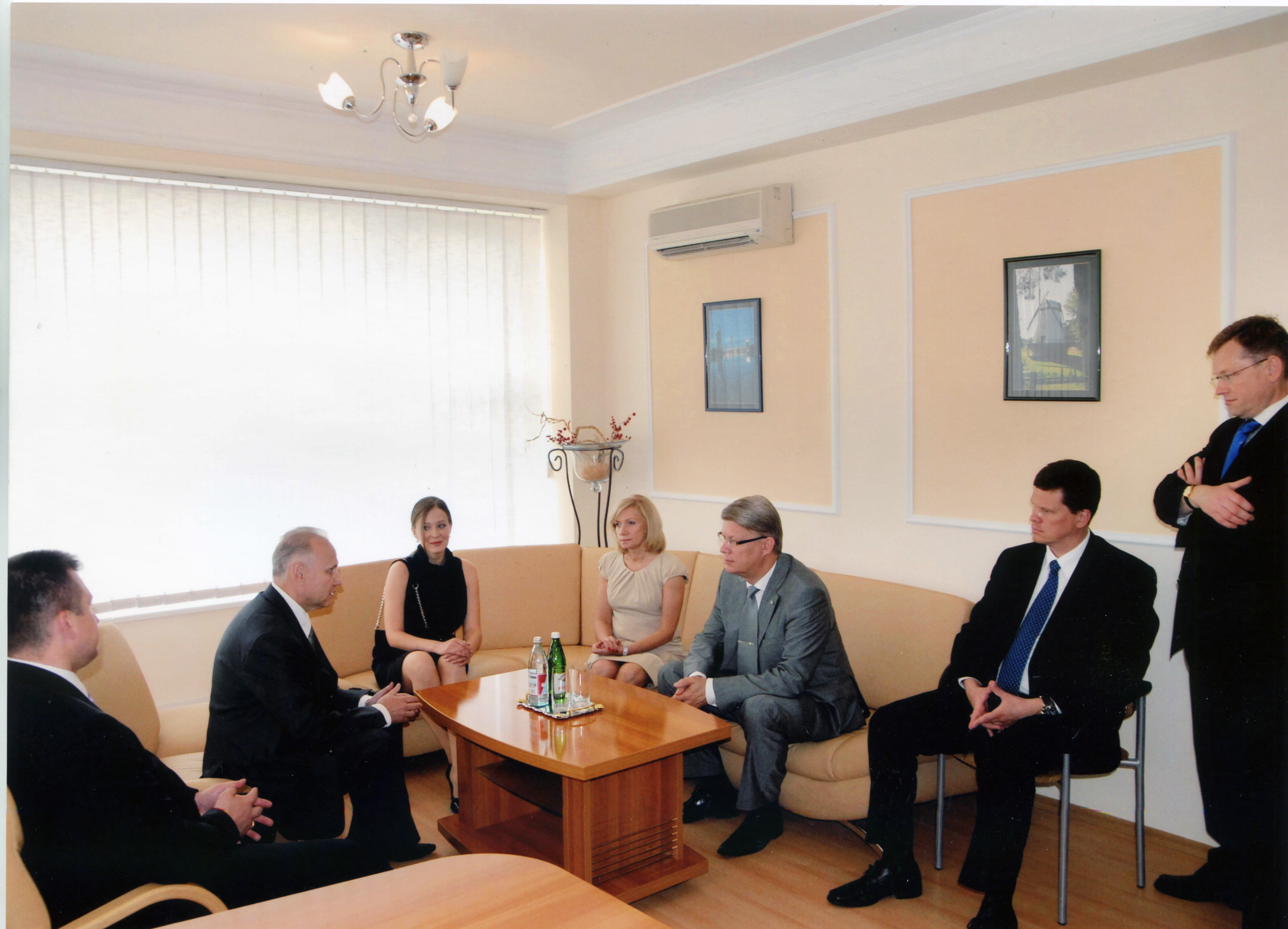
Meeting of the President of the Latvian Republic Valdis Zatlers with the Honorary Consul of the Republic of Latvia in Lviv Volodymyr Hartsula.

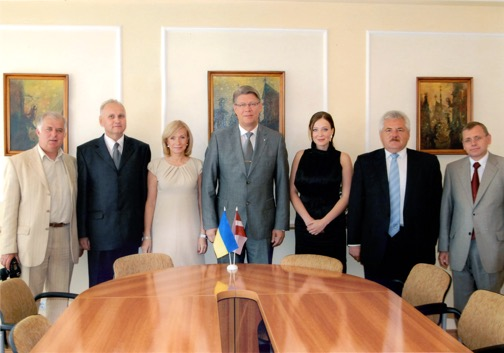
The President of the Latvian Republic Valdis Zatlers at the Honorary Consulate of Latvia, 27 June 2008.

The Honorary Consulate of the Republic of Latvia in Lviv was founded on 12 February 1992. Its primary aim was to deepen bilateral inter-regional partnerships and extend cooperation in areas of trade, economics, and cultural relations. Its first representative in Lviv was Volodymyr Hartsyla, a well-known local entrepreneur, public figure, and head of the "BEEM" group. The consular office began operating on 20 July 2005. A delegation headed by the Ambassador Extraordinary and Plenipotentiary of the Republic of Latvia to Ukraine, Andris Vilcāns, participated in the opening ceremony. The main areas of activity of the consulate include the establishment and development of business, academic, and cultural contacts between Latvia and Ukraine, support of Latvian citizens during their stay in the territory of the consular district, and the organization of different educational and cultural events. In June 2008, the Office was involved in organizing the President of the Latvian Republic Valdis Zatlers' visit to Lviv during his state visit to Ukraine. During this visit, and with the assistance of Honorary Consul V. Hartsula, a number of cooperative agreements were signed between Lviv, Riga, and other towns of the Lviv region and Latvia (Drohobych, Pustomyty and Smiltene, Zhovkva and Cēsis, Truskavets and Ludza). For his contributions to the Latvian Republic, V. Hartsula was awarded the oldest Latvian order, 'The Cross of Recognition' in September 2008. The Honorary Consulate of the Republic of Latvia is located at 57 Chornovil Ave.

== History ==
Official Latvian-Polish relations were initiated on 27 January 1921, when Poland recognized the Latvian Republic. The first consulate of the Latvian Republic in Lviv started its work in June 1929. Jurisdiction of the Consulate extended to all eastern voivodeships of the then Second Polish Republic, including Lviv.

In May 1929 Wit Sulimirski was appointed the Honorary Consul of the Republic of Latvia in Lviv. He was an oil manufacturer known in Lviv and Halychyna, owned oil fields in Krosno County, was a member of the supervisory council of the Polish Industrial Bank, and was the JSC "Gazolina", chair of the Democratic Club in Lviv.

The Latvian Consulate was located then at 1 Romanovych St. (presently 1 Sakahansky St., building of the biological faculty of the Ivan Franko National University of Lviv), in the office facilities of the Dnister Oil Union "Desna", to which the head of the representation had direct ties. The Polish-American Emigration (Colonization) Syndicate was located in the same building.

Sulimirski taking office as the Latvian Consul in Lviv coincided with conclusion of the revolutionary agreement of the Lviv Gas Plant and JSC "Gazolina" on the construction of a gas pipeline Dashava-Lviv (68 km) to the Lviv Gas Plant, supplying it with natural gas. Successful cooperation with JSC 'Gazolina' continued until 1939 when the new regime created the Stryi Production Division of the People's Commissariat of Oil Industry of the USSR. Operation of the Latvian Consulate ceased in September 1939 as a result of the beginning of World War II.
