= Christos Rokofyllos =

Greek politician (1931–2025)

Christos Rokofillos (Greek: Χρήστος Ροκόφυλλος; 19 November 1931 – 24 May 2025) was a Greek lawyer, diplomat and politician. He served as a PASOK MP, Deputy Minister of Industry and Foreign Affairs, Ambassador of Greece to Paris and the Vatican, and Governor of the Agricultural Bank.

== Life and career ==
Rokofillos was born on 19 November 1931 in Amfilochia. He graduated with honors from the Law School of Athens and continued his studies in Paris, where he was awarded a Doctor of Law from the University of Paris II - Sorbonne (with honors and a cash prize from the CNRS for the publication of his dissertation). He worked as a lawyer in Athens, while at the same time he taught at the University of Athens.

He was elected as a Member of Parliament for Aitoloakarnania with PASOK in the elections of 1977, 1985, 1989 (June, and November), 1990, 1993 and 1996. He was President of the Greece-France Friendship Group. A regular member of the Western European Union and the Council of Europe (1990–1994), and head of the Greek delegation to the NATO Parliamentary Assembly. He was the parliamentary representative of PASOK in the Parliament that emerged from the 1993 elections.

On 13 December 1999, he was awarded the Grand Cross of the Order of Prince Henry.

Rokofillos died on 24 May 2025, at the age of 93.
