= Latvia–Lithuania relations =

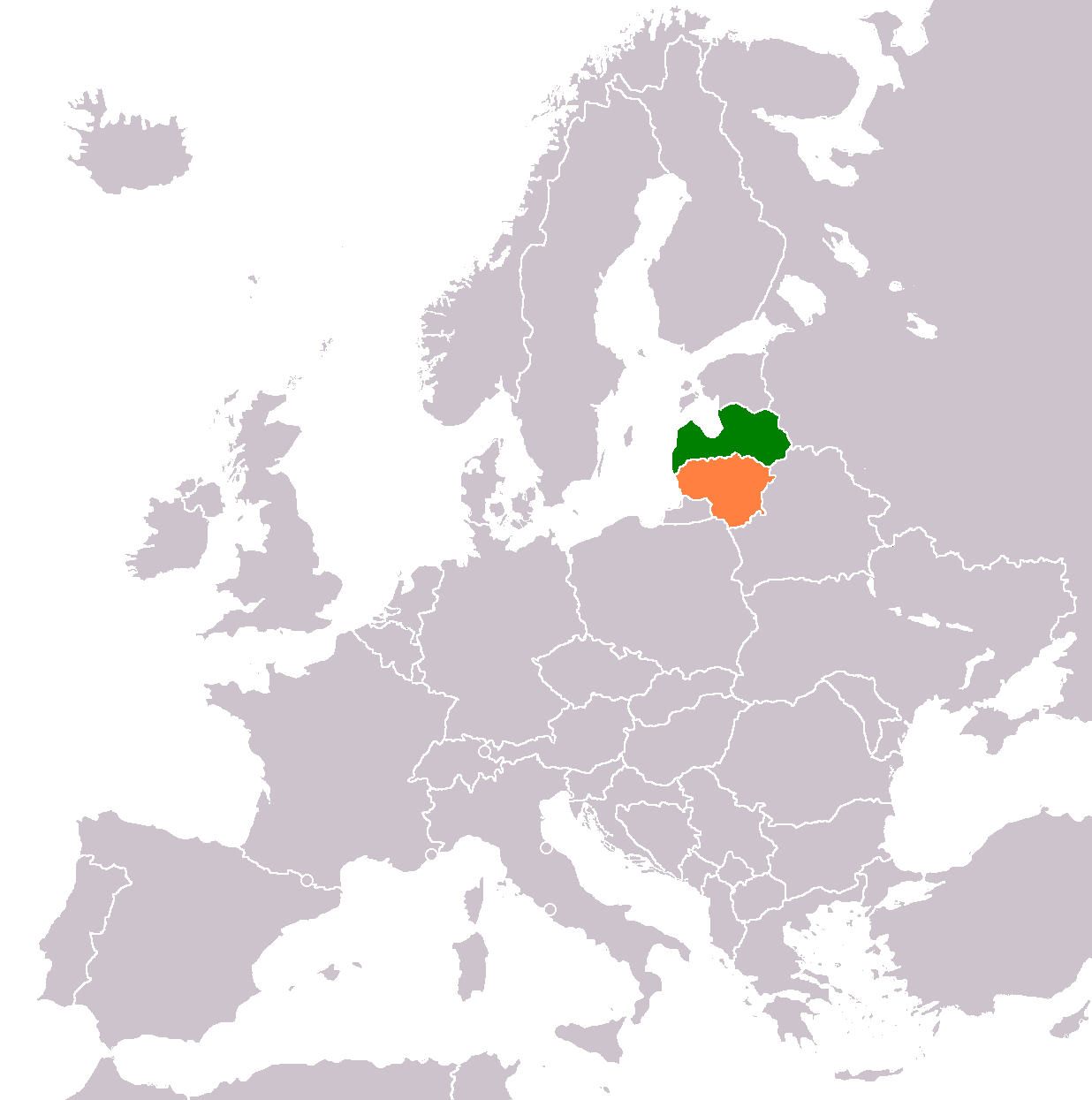

- Latvia: Lithuania

Diplomatic mission
- Latvian Embassy, Vilnius: Lithuanian Embassy, Riga

Envoy
- Ambassador Einars Semanis: Ambassador Antanas Vinkus

Latvia–Lithuania relations are bilateral international relations between Latvia and Lithuania. Latvia has an embassy in Vilnius, and Lithuania has an embassy in Riga. The two states share 588 kilometres (365 mi) of common border. Both countries are full members of the Council of the Baltic Sea States, Joint Expeditionary Force, NATO and European Union.

== History ==
=== Medieval period ===
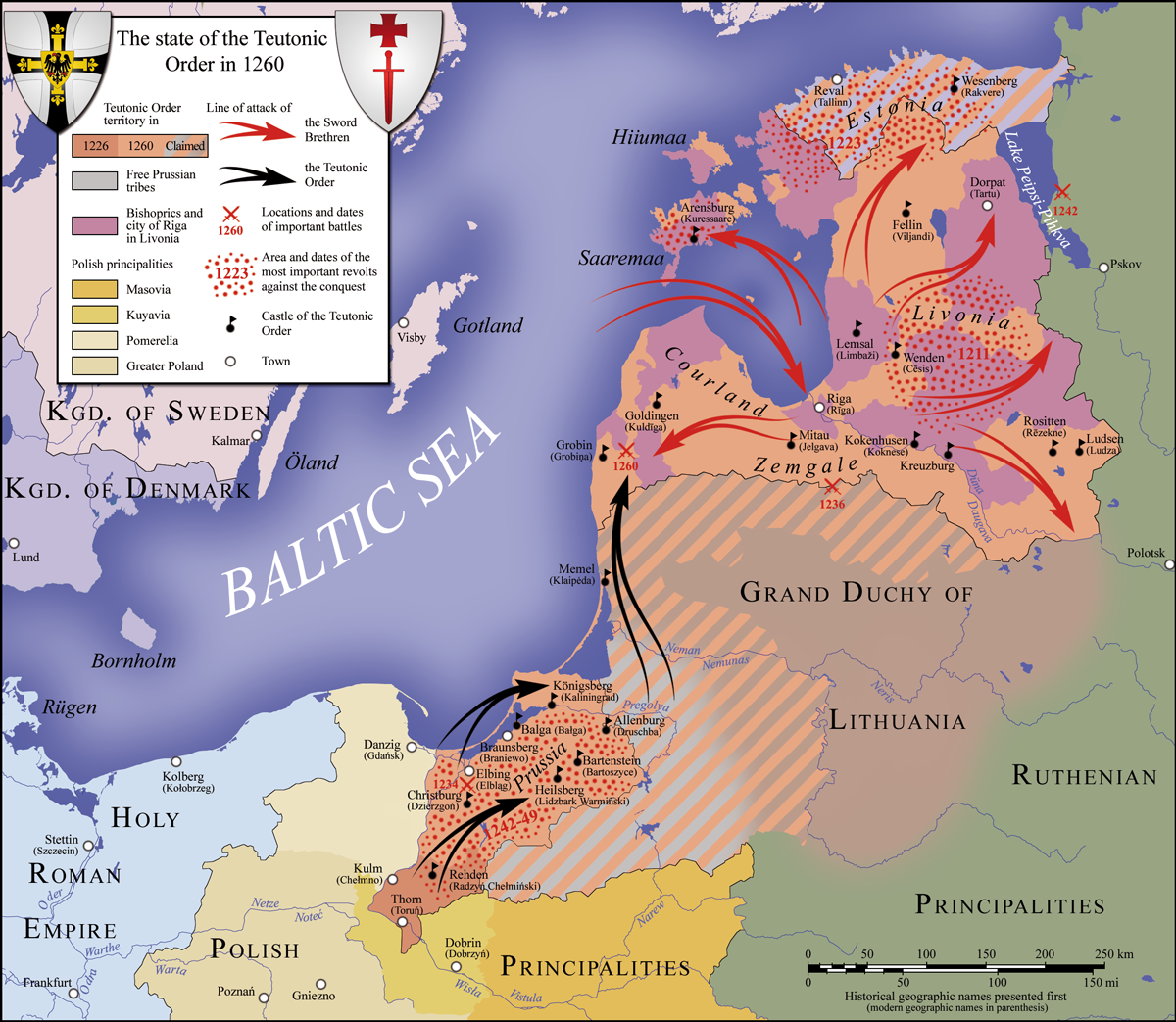
Map depicting the Northern Crusade in 1200's under which many Balts became the victims of German expansion. Lithuanians were the only Baltic people who remained independent.

Relations between Baltic tribes developed even in pre-state times. From the 12th century, the Baltic tribes were linked by a common struggle with the Livonian Brothers of the Sword (1202–1237), and later with the Order of Livonia. The Grand Duchy of Lithuania prevented the German states of the Livonian Confederation from germanizing the inhabitants of present-day Latvia, becoming a certain barrier to the emigration of Germans—primarily peasants—to the Baltic lands, and encouraged Latvian resistance against enslavers. After the Battle of Aizkraukle in 1279, Duke Nameisis of the Semigalians recognized the supremacy of Grand Duke Traidenis of Lithuania and became a member of the Council of the Grand Duke of Lithuania. Lithuanian crews were stationed in several Semigalian castles. Between 1281 and 1313, Lithuania ruled Daugavpils, the lands up to Daugava and its surroundings. In the 13th century, during the war with Livonia, many members of Curonians, Semigalians, Selonians and other tribes from the territory of present-day Latvia moved to Lithuania, strengthened its economic and military potential, and eventually merged into the emerging Lithuanian nation. It is believed that the Latgalians moved to their place, thus the territory of the Latvians expanded and their nation began to form.

From the 13th century, Riga was an important trade partner of the Grand Duchy of Lithuania; a large part of foreign trade was conducted through the city. During the 13th and 15th centuries, during the beginning of the war between the estates of Livonia and Lithuania, a wide stretch of sparsely inhabited or uninhabited land was formed. In the beginning of the 16th century, during the internal colonization, the Lithuanian peasants founded villages and cultivated the lands; Lithuanian states naturally expanded to the north. From north to south, the Latvian peasantry did the same. The border between the possessions of Lithuania and Livonia, which settled over time, is shown by the treaty of 1529. According to the treaty, some areas of present-day southern Latvia belonged to Lithuania; the border was established to the north of the current districts of Rokiškis (Dienvidsusēja), Pasvalys (Nemunėlis to Luopgalė), Pakruojis, Joniškis, Naujoji Akmenė districts (later, the border established in 1529 and coincided in many places with the northern border of Kaunas Governorate; the governorate included Aknīste, Grendza, Nereta, Šķirāni, Ukrai and other Lithuanian or mixed settlements).

=== Early modern period ===
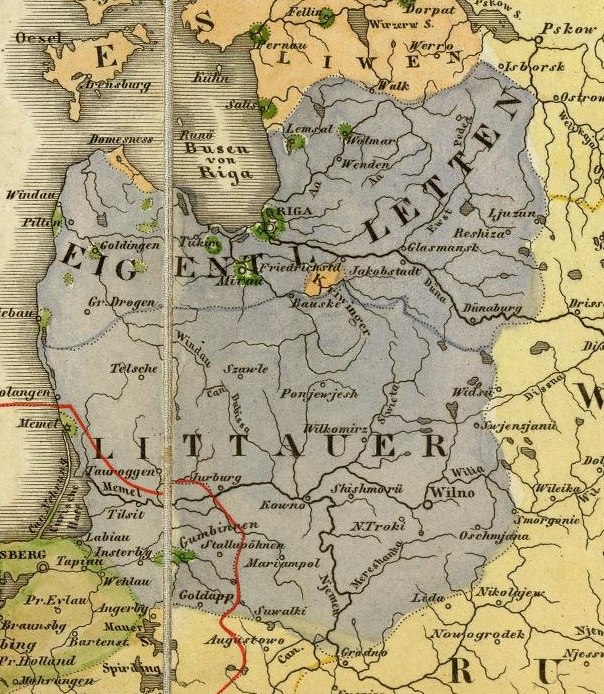
Ethnographic map of Lithuanians (Littauer) and Latvians (Letten) in 1847 by Heinrich Berghaus. The red line marks the border between Germany and Russia.

During the Livonian War (1558–1583), the territory of present-day Latvia north of the Daugava was transferred to Lithuania, it became the Duchy of Livonia (1561–1677), which was an autonomous province of the GDL in 1561–1569, later it belonged to the Polish–Lithuanian Commonwealth, and was administered by the Lithuanian and Polish dignitaries. To the south of the Daugava, the Duchy of Courland and Semigallia (1561–1795) under the Commonwealth was created. In 1581–1621 Riga also belonged to the Commonwealth. Riga and Liepāja were two of the three main ports for the foreign maritime trade of Lithuania.

After the Polish–Swedish War (1600–1629) according to the Truce of Altmark (1629), the Commonwealth retained only southern and eastern parts of present-day Latvia, as the Inflanty Voivodeship and the Duchy of Courland and Semigallia. 16th–18th-century Lithuanian settlements near Daugavpils reached Daugava (Lithuanian was spoken here until the beginning of the 19th century) and crossed it; the territory inhabited by Lithuanians is shown by the surviving names of settlements with the suffix -išk. From the late 18th century until 1915, all of Latvia and most of Lithuania were ruled by the Russian Empire. In 1819, the Russian authorities assigned the Palanga counties (which originally belonged to Lithuania) were given to the Curonian Governorate since they wanted the entire Baltic coast to be in one governorate, and the Aknīste counties (formerly belonged to the Curonian Governorate) to the Kaunas governorate.

=== Interwar period ===
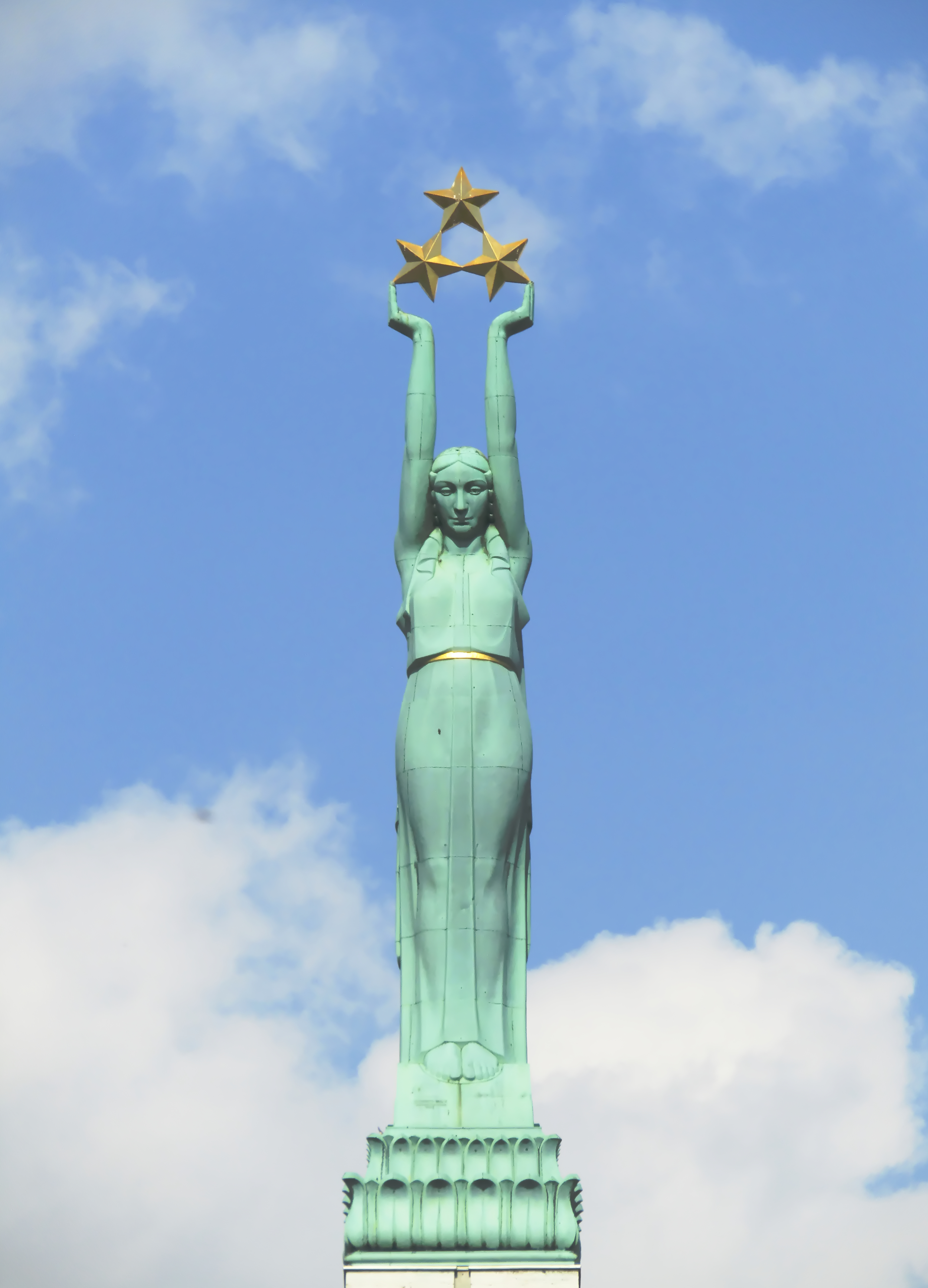
The female figure at the top of the Freedom Monument is modeled after a Lithuanian woman Milda Jasikienė, who lived in Riga. Latvians simply and affectionately refer to the statue as "Milda".

After the First World War, when the Baltic countries were creating independent states, on 1919 March 1, the Lithuanian and Latvian governments signed an agreement in Kaunas, and Lithuania granted Latvia a 5 million mark loan, acquired the right to use the port of Liepāja duty-free for the transport of military and commercial cargo for a while, and agreed to fight the Bolsheviks together.

On September 8, 1919, Latvia recognized Lithuania's de facto independence, and on February 23, 1921, recognized their independence de jure. Since 1919, there have been embassies of Lithuania in Riga and Latvian embassies in Kaunas. In 1923–1929, the "Lithuanian vice-consulate" operated in Daugavpils, had consulates in Riga, Liepāja, and until 1924 in Bauska. In 1919–1920 there were disputes about the border of both states. It was established by the agreement of both parties in March 1921 by the arbitration commission (established in 1920, with James Young Simpson as chairman). The border is essentially the northern border of the former Kaunas Governorate. According to the agreement, Lithuania received majority-Lithuanian Palanga county and the Šventoji–Palanga coastal stretch (183 km^{2}), and Latvia received part of the northernmost Lithuanian settlements (Šķirāni and Ukrai) and disputed territories such as Aknīste, a total of 290 km^{2} (Latvia received a larger area, because the coastal territory was considered more valuable than the mainland). A popular among Lithuanians saying of the event at the time was "we exchanged our land with out land".

In the 1930s and 1940s, under a special agreement, the so-called Baltic Clause, the Baltic countries granted each other trade preferences that were greater than those of other most-favoured nations. On January 12, 1933, The Latvian–Lithuanian Small Border Communication and Cooperation Agreement was signed in Riga. On September 12, 1934, in Geneva, Estonia, Latvia and Lithuania signed the Treaty of Harmony and Cooperation between the States; the political diplomatic union Baltic Entente was formed.

=== During the Soviet occupation ===
Map showing territorial changes of the Baltic states in 1939-1945 after their integration into the Soviet Union

After the occupation of the Baltic countries by the USSR in June 1940, diplomatic missions and consulates of both nations countries continued to operate in the United States of America and other countries that did not recognize the Soviet annexation of the Baltic countries. After the end of the funds deposited by Lithuania in the United States of America, the diplomatic representatives of Latvia and Lithuania, with the mediation of officials of the State Department of the United States of America, agreed in 1980 on a loan to maintain Lithuanian embassies; to repay this loan in 2005 Lithuania and Latvia signed an Agreement on the repayment of the debt to the Republic of Latvia in connection with the maintenance of the Embassy of the Republic of Lithuania in Washington, D.C. The legal sovereignty of Latvia, Lithuania and Estonia was reminded to the world public by the remaining embassies and the communities of emigrants and war refugees who went to Western countries and fought for the restoration of the independence of the Baltic States. Joint white organizations were founded (Baltic Committee, Council of White Women), joint publications were published (Baltic Review, Baltic News and others). The struggle for the restoration of the independence of the three republics occupied by the USSR became more organized when the young generation of war refugees grew up. Due to the efforts of the organizations founded by it (American White Freedom League, United American White National Committee, World White Union and others) in 1982–1991 in the United States of America and other countries, the Day of White Freedom was celebrated on a national scale, the Baltic Peace and Freedom Cruise was organized in 1985, the 1985 Copenhagen organized Baltic Tribunal; these and many other innovative actions reminded the society of Western countries and international organizations of the case of the freedom of the Baltic countries, and encouraged resistance to the Soviet occupation regime.

From the 20th century In the Soviet Union of the 1960s, demonstrative cooperation of neighboring so-called "unionized republics", so-called "socialist racing", was encouraged (Latvian and Lithuanian cities, districts, companies, farms competed); meetings and connections of intellectuals (e.g. scientists, primarily Latvian and Lithuanian linguists, artists, actors, encyclopedists) contributed to the enrichment of the cultures of both nations. Joint folklore festivals, students and other celebrations, Baltic painting triennials were held. Lithuania and Latvia helped each other to train specialists in narrower specialties (in 1985, about 40 students from Lithuania studied at the Riga Polytechnic Institute, more than 100 from Latvia at the Kaunas Polytechnic Institute and Vilnius University). Relations between the fighters against the Soviet regime were also forged (in 1975 a joint memorandum of the Forty-Five Baltic States was signed, other statements).

=== Restoration of independence ===
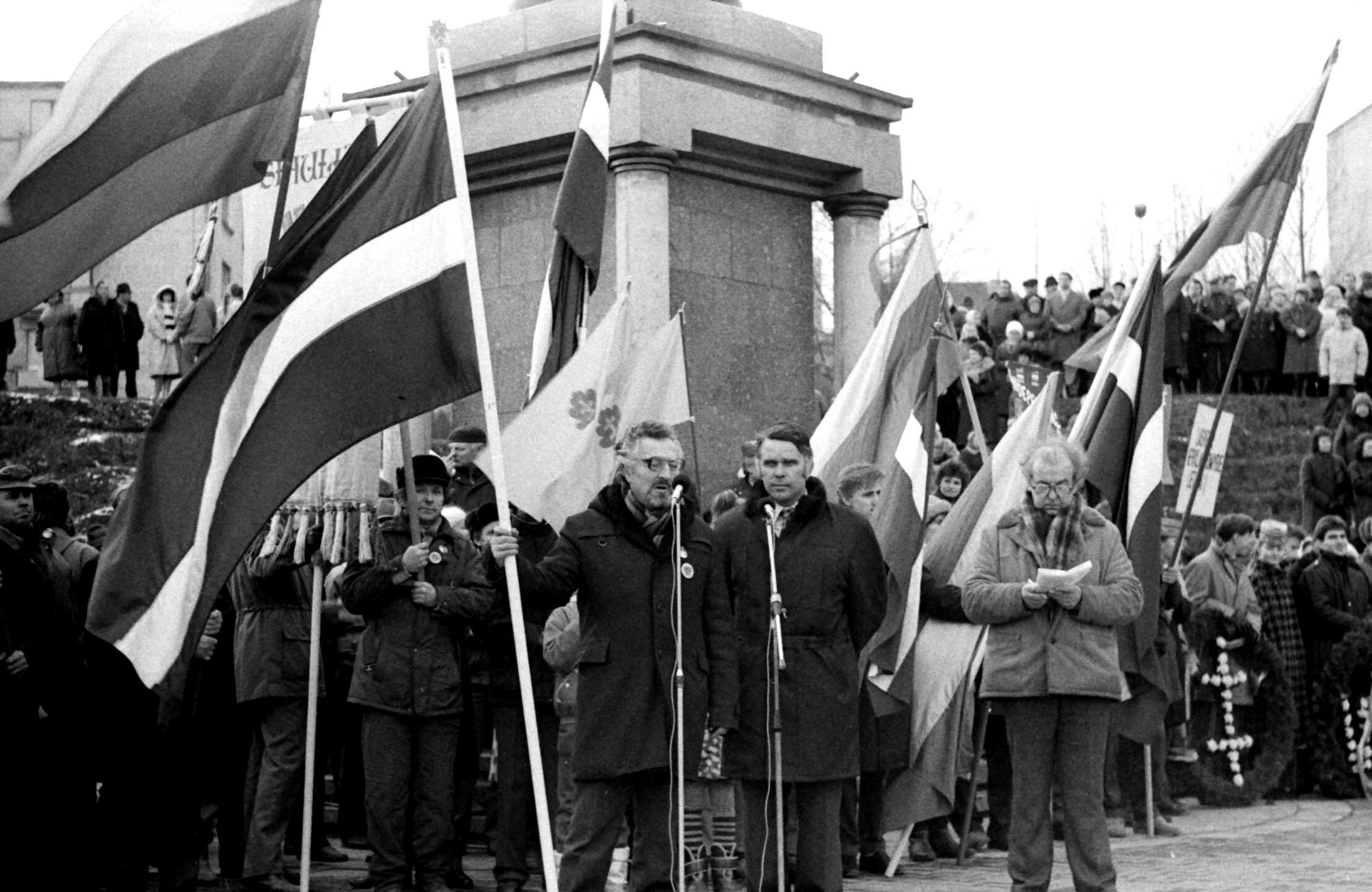
Day of Lithuanian independence in Šiauliai, Lithuania. The event is attended by the Latvian political party For Fatherland and Freedom/LNNK

In the late 20th century, the struggle against the Soviet occupation brought the nations of the Baltic countries closer together. In 1988–1990, the society and numerous organizations led the struggle for the restoration of the independence of Latvia, Lithuania and Estonia. The Baltic Way (1989) and the Flaming Baltic Road (1991) are notable among their joint actions. The Baltic Assembly was established as institution for cooperation.

Based on the principles of the 1934 Geneva Conference, Estonia, Latvia and Lithuania founded the Council of Baltic States on 12 May 1990 and the council operated until the end of 1992. On 22 August 1991, Lithuania recognized the independence of Latvia which was declared on 21 August 1991. The countries are represented by ambassadors residing in Riga and Vilnius. The Baltic countries are developing regional cooperation. According to the 1994 agreement, its main forms are: the Baltic Assembly, a cooperation organization of the parliaments of Estonia, Latvia and Lithuania, the cooperation of governments is coordinated by the Baltic Council of Ministers, and joint sessions of these organizations (Baltic Council) are held. The Forum of the Heads of State of the Three Baltic States is active (since 1990), now it is also called the Council of Baltic Presidents. The Baltic countries cooperate in the field of defense (Baltic Battalion, Baltic Air Surveillance Network, Baltic Naval Squadron, Baltic Defence College). Since the late 20th century countries cooperated in order to becomethe members of NATO and the European Union. Their efforts were supported by the joint organizations of Baltic diaspora in the Western countries. Baltic Unity Day is celebrated every year on September 22.

== Economic relations ==
Lithuania–Latvia Interconnection

In 2020, the trade turnover between Latvia and Lithuania amounted to €4.9 billion. Lithuania exported 2.65 billion worth of goods to Latvia. Latvia mainly imported mineral fuel (15%), electrical machines and equipment and parts (10%) from Lithuania, Lithuania from Latvia - electrical machines and devices (17%). Latvia's direct investments in the Lithuanian economy in 2017 amounted to 493.5 million. euro while Lithuanian to Latvian economy - 1.057 billion. euros.

Lithuania is the main economic partner of Latvia. In 2022, Lithuania was the primary source of Latvia's imports, constituting 24.3% of the total. Additionally, Lithuania was the main destination for Latvian exports, with exports worth approximately 3.9 billion euros in 2022.

Lithuania's growing economy, especially in industries like retail, manufacturing, and technology, has begun offering attractive job prospects which has led to an increasing number of Latvian citizens moving to work in Lithuania due to Lithuanian employers offering higher salaries and better benefits compared to similar jobs in Latvia.

== European Union ==
Both countries became members of the European Union in 2004.

== NATO ==
Both countries became members of NATO in 2004.

== Resident diplomatic missions ==
- Latvia has an embassy in Vilnius.
- Lithuania has an embassy in Riga.

== See also ==
- Foreign relations of Latvia
- Foreign relations of Lithuania
- 2004 enlargement of the European Union
- Lithuanians in Latvia
- Latvians in Lithuania
