= Lielmēmele Manor =

Manor house in Latvia

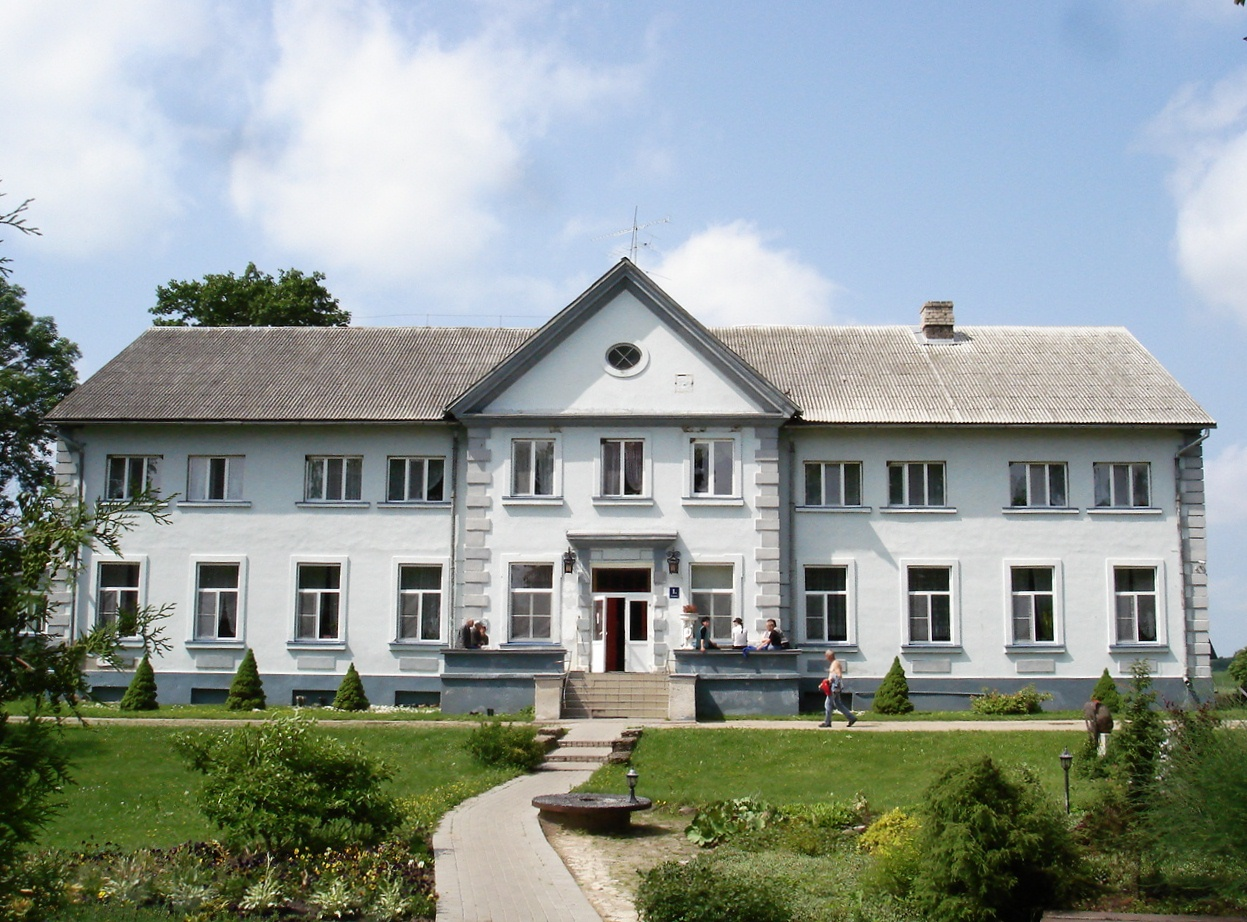
- Interactive map of the Lielmēmele Manor area

General information
- Architectural style: Classicism
- Location: Mazzalve parish, Nereta municipality, Latvia
- Completed: Second half of 19th. century.
- Client: von Schlippenbach family

Lielmēmele Manor (Latvian: Lielmēmeles muižas pils, German: Groß-Memelhof), also called Mēmele, is a manor house in the Mazzalve Parish of Aizkraukle Municipality in the Selonia region of Latvia.

Former name of the estate is Memelhof and from 1515 until 1760 it belonged to von Ropp family. In 1860 property was bought by von Schlippenbach family. Current manor house was built during this time. Last owner of the Manor who owned it until 1920 was Metta von der Osten Sacken. During Latvian agrarian reform of 1920 manor lands were nationalized and partitioned. Since 1930 manor house was used as a residential building for Latvian border guards. During Second World War in 1944 a German military HQ and hospital was located in the manor house. In 1946 a nursing home was located in the manor house. In 1974 it was transformed as a nursing home for people with mental disorders.

Originally manor house had one floor. Second floor was added after the Second World War.

== See also ==
- List of palaces and manor houses in Latvia
