= Ērberģe Manor =

Manor house in Latvia

- Selonia, Latvia
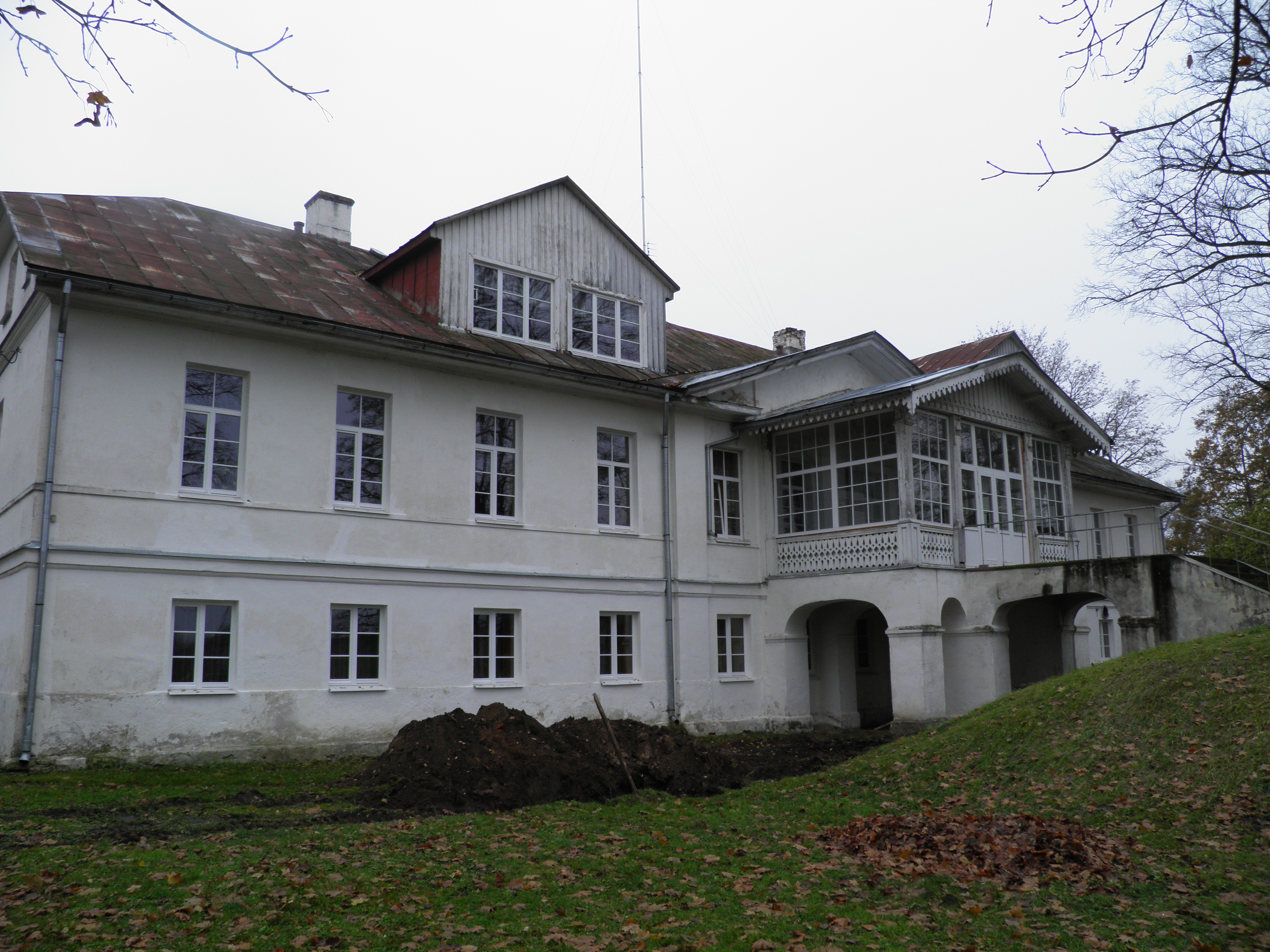

Site information
- Type: Manor

Location
- Location within Latvia
- Coordinates: 56°21′52.8″N 25°01′01.6″E

Ērberģe Manor is a manor in Ērberģe, in the Mazzalve Parish of Aizkraukle Municipality in the Selonia region of Latvia.

== History ==
The manor was owned by Heinrich Zellem ( Selle ) and his descendants from 1465 until the end of the Livonian War. In 1582 manor was acquired by Liddinghausen-Wolff by inheritance. In 1686 the manor was bought by Gothard Wilhelm von Fittinghof, whose daughter married a freelance Alexander von Taube. Until the annexation of the Duchy of Courland in 1795, the manor belonged to their heirs. Before 1806, the Ērberģe Manor was purchased by the von Hahn family, who built the manor house in Classicism style in 1868, at the same time when they built the Holmhof Manor. After the expropriation of the manor house in the 1920s, the family of Baron von Hahn moved to the Ērberģe mill premises. At the time of the transfer, the manor had 1862 hectares and was divided between 158 farms. In the former manor house from 1922 to 1927 there was a Latvian post office and from 1930 an elementary school.

At the end of World War II, the Red Army military hospital was housed in the school building in 1944. The school was attached to electrical grid in 1962, with a central heating, water pipe, and a new electrical installation in 1983.

== English Park ==
The English Park of the Manor is located by the Dienvidsusēja River. The park covers an area of 7.8 hectares. The Marija Bridge across the Dienvidsusēja River is also part of the manor complex. There is a stage in the park that is not part of the manor complex.

== See also ==
- List of palaces and manor houses in Latvia
- The Last Motor Race of The Empire Page 56
