= Žemoji Gervė =

Location
- Country: Lithuania
- Region: Biržai district municipality, Panevėžys County

Physical characteristics
- Source
  - location: Biržai Forest
- Mouth: Apaščia
  - coordinates: 56.35816°N 24.75546°E
- Length: 21 km (13 mi)

Basin features
- Progression: Apaščia→ Nemunėlis→ Lielupe→ Baltic Sea

The Žemoji Gervė is a river of Biržai district municipality, Panevėžys County, in northern Lithuania. It is a right tributary of the Apaščia.
