= Gervė =

Location
- Country: Lithuania
- Region: Biržai district municipality, Panevėžys County

Physical characteristics
- Mouth: Aukštoji Gervė
  - coordinates: 56°17′24″N 24°51′42″E
- Length: 20 km (12 mi)
- Basin size: 109 km^{2} (42 sq mi)

Basin features
- Progression: Aukštoji Gervė→ Apaščia→ Nemunėlis→ Lielupe→ Baltic Sea

The Gervė is a river of Biržai district municipality, Panevėžys County, northern Lithuania. It flows for 20 kilometres (12 mi) and has a basin area of 109 km^{2} (42 sq mi). It is a right tributary of the Aukštoji Gervė.
