= Nereta (river) =

River in Latvia and Lithuania

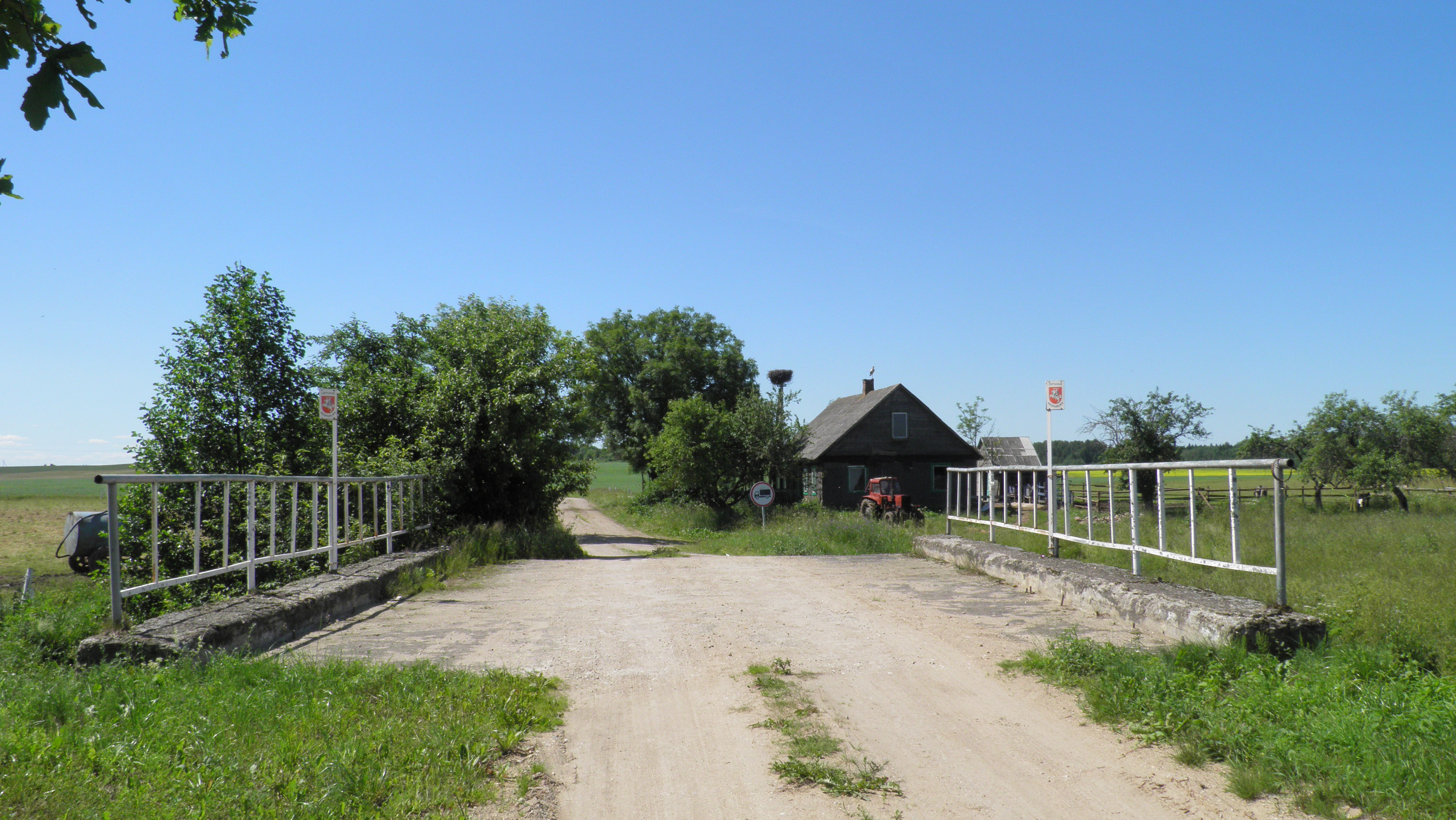

Location
- Countries: Lithuania, Latvia
- Region: Biržai district municipality, Panevėžys County, Nereta Municipality

Physical characteristics
- Source
  - location: Sargūni swamp
- Mouth: Nemunėlis
  - coordinates: 56.18519°N 25.09271°E
  - elevation: 69.2 m (227 ft)
- Length: 25 km (16 mi)
- Basin size: 108 km²

Basin features
- Progression: Nemunėlis→ Lielupe→ Baltic Sea

Nereta (Latvian: Neretiņa) is a river of Biržai district municipality, Panevėžys County, northern Lithuania and Southern Latvia. It flows for 25 kilometres (16 mi). For 18 km (11 mi), the river forms the border between Latvia and Lithuania. It is a right tributary of the Nemunėlis.
