= Bėnupė (village) =

- Village
- Location within Lithuania
- Coordinates: 56.402°N 24.857°E
- Country: Lithuania
- County: Panevėžys County

Population
  - Total: 2
- Time zone: Eastern European Time (UTC+2)
  - Summer (DST): Eastern European Summer Time (UTC+3)

Bėnupė is a village in Biržai District Municipality, Panevėžys County, Lithuania, on the Bėnupė river. The population was 2 in 2011. It is located near the border with Latvia.
