= Aukštoji Gervė =

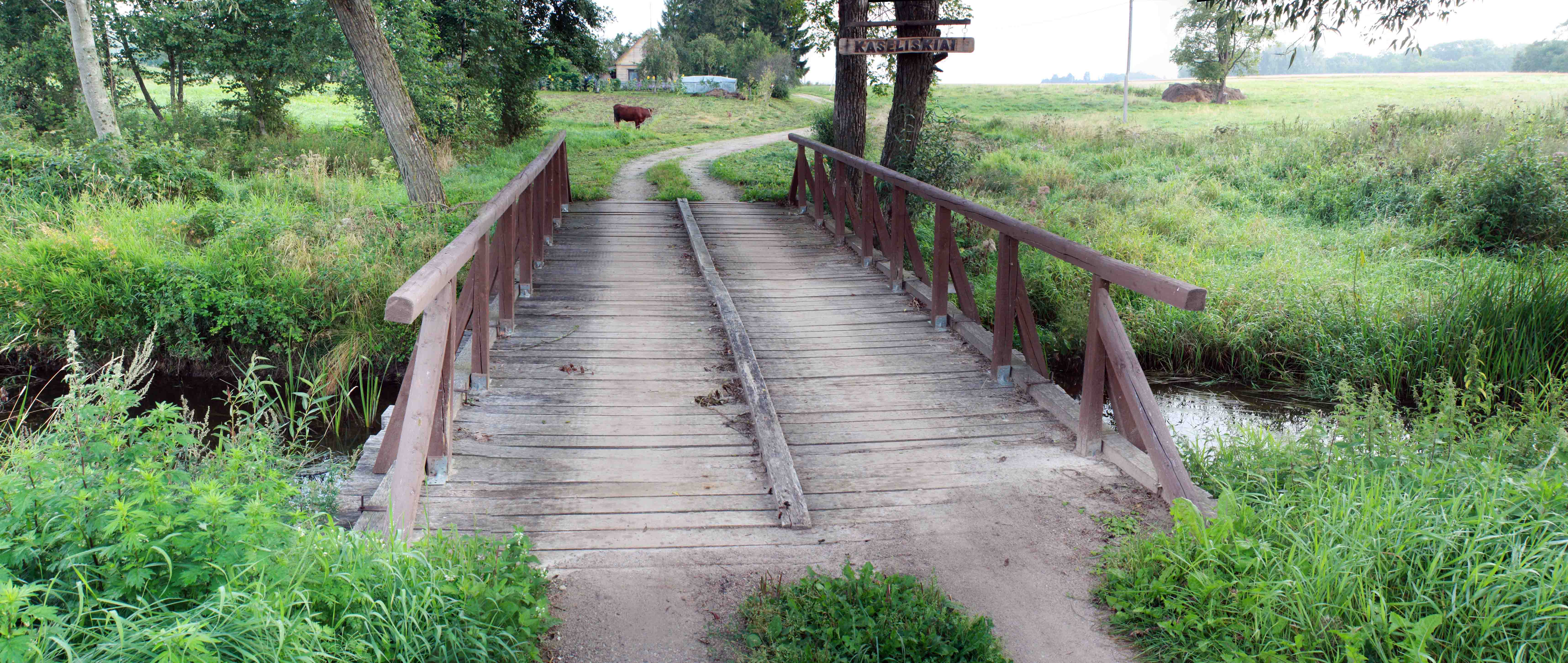

Location
- Country: Lithuania
- Location: Biržai district municipality, Panevėžys County

Physical characteristics
- Mouth: Apaščia
  - coordinates: 56.3280°N 24.7509°E

Basin features
- Progression: Apaščia→ Nemunėlis→ Lielupe→ Baltic Sea
- Tributaries
  - right: Gervė

The Aukštoji Gervė is a river of Biržai district municipality, Panevėžys County, in northern Lithuania. It flows for 26 kilometres and has a basin area of 109 km^{2}. It is a right tributary of the Apaščia.
