= Rovėja =

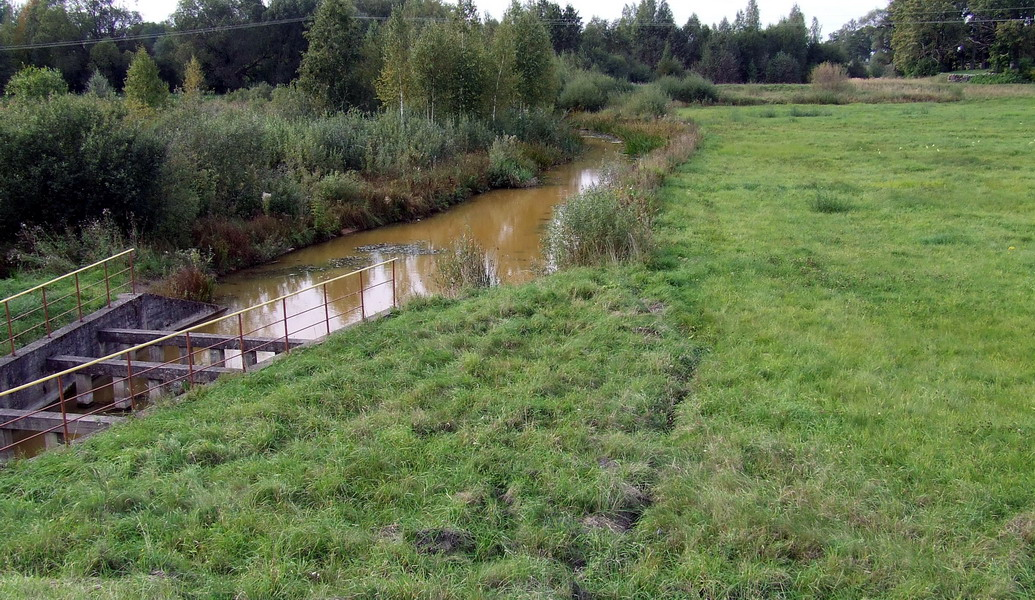

Location
- Countries: Lithuania
- Region: Biržai district municipality, Panevėžys County

Physical characteristics
- Mouth: Apaščia
  - coordinates: 56°15′18″N 24°43′59″E
- Length: 35 km (22 mi)
- Basin size: 216 km^{2} (83 sq mi)

Basin features
- Progression: Apaščia→ Nemunėlis→ Lielupe→ Baltic Sea
- Tributaries
  - right: Serbenta

The Rovėja is a river of Biržai district municipality, Panevėžys County, northern Lithuania. It flows for 35 kilometres (22 mi) and has a basin area of 216 km^{2} (83 sq mi).

It is a right tributary of the Apaščia.
