= Latvians in Lithuania =

Latvians in Lithuania Latvieši Lietuvā
- (Latvia) (Lithuania)
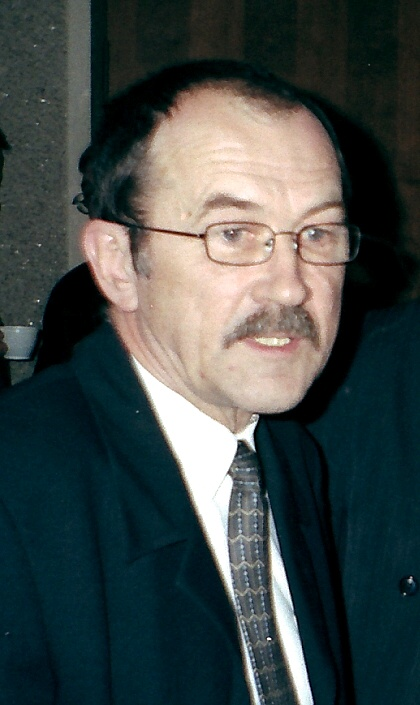
Romualdas Ozolas

Total population
- 2,025; 0.07% of the Lithuanian Population

Regions with significant populations
- Palanga, tiny population in Vilnius and Klaipėda

Languages
- Latvian, Lithuanian, Russian

Religion
- Protestantism, Roman Catholicism

Related ethnic groups
- Other Latvians

The Latvian minority in Lithuania (Latvian: latvieši, Lithuanian: latviai) numbered 2,025 persons at the 2011 census, and at 0.07% of the total population of Lithuania, being the 9th biggest national minority. The Latvian national minority in Lithuania has a long history.

According to the 2011 census, 46.2% of Latvians speak Latvian as their mother tongue, while Lithuanian is native for 27.8%, Russian - 14.6% of Latvians. 3.95% of Latvians are bilingual in terms that they have 2 mother tongues.

Cities with a relatively significant Latvian proportion:

- Palanga – 0.97%
- Naujoji Akmenė – 0.55%

== Famous Lithuanians of Latvian descent ==
- Romualdas Ozolas, a nationalist thinker
- Baiba Skurstene, a Lithuanian-Latvian singer

== See also ==
- Kursenieki
- Ethnic minorities in Lithuania
- Latvia–Lithuania relations
