= Biržai Regional Park =

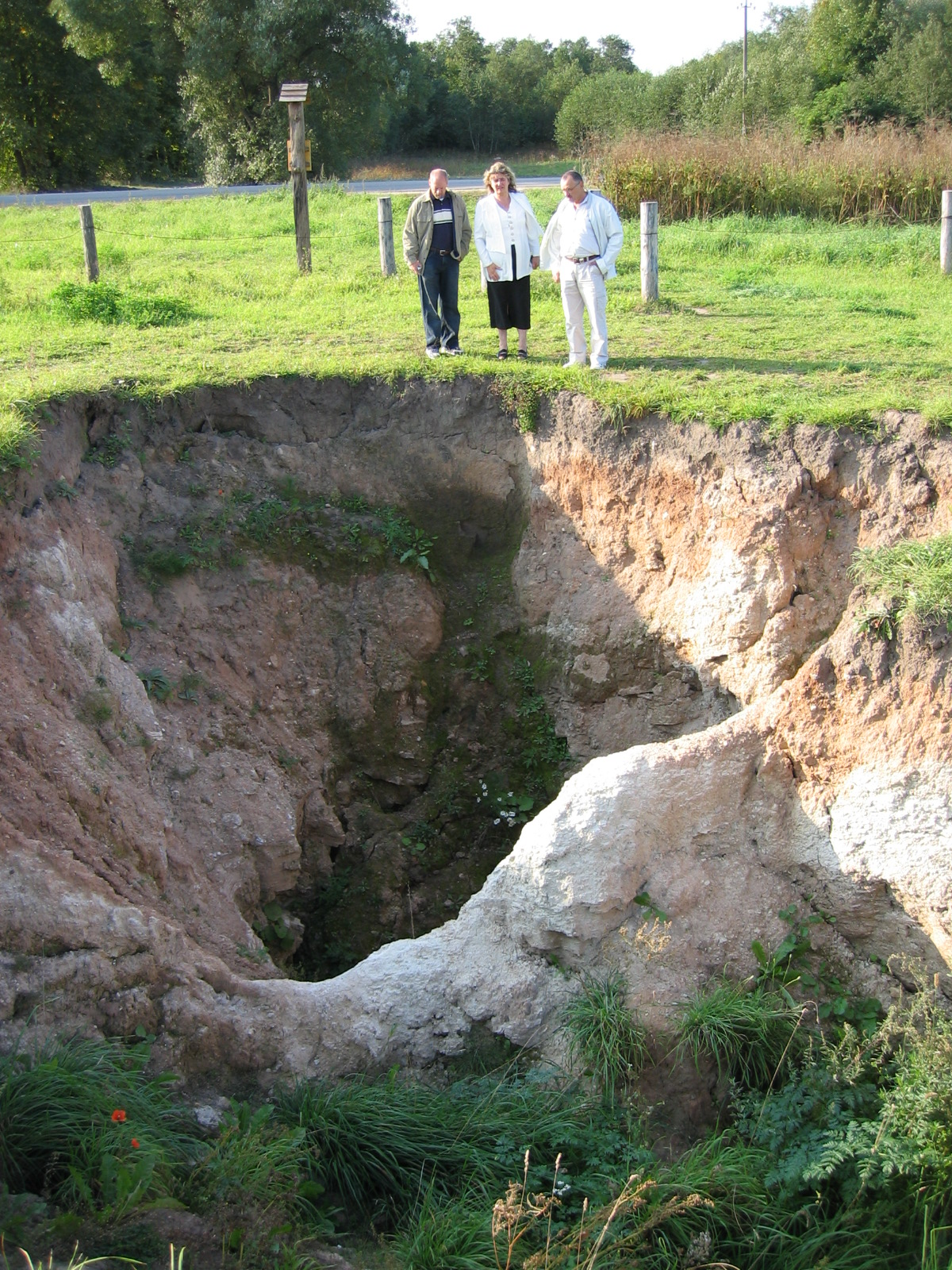
- Sinkhole formed in 2004

- Location within Lithuania
- Location: Panevėžys County, Lithuania
- Nearest city: Biržai
- Coordinates: 56.201°N 24.659°E
- Area: 14,659 hectares (36,220 acres)
- Established: 1992

Biržai Regional Park covers 14,659 hectares (36,220 acres) in northern Lithuania near its border with Latvia. It was established in 1992 to preserve a distinctive karst landscape. About 20% of its area is covered by forest.

The park is notable for its sinkholes, created by the dissolution of the gypsum underlying its soil. About 9,000 sinkholes have been identified; the most notable is the Karvės ola (Cow's Cave), which is about 20 meters deep. In 1998 the use of pesticides and fertilizers in the area was restricted.

== See also ==
- Biržai Forest
