= Nereta Parish =

Parish of Latvia

- parish of Latvia
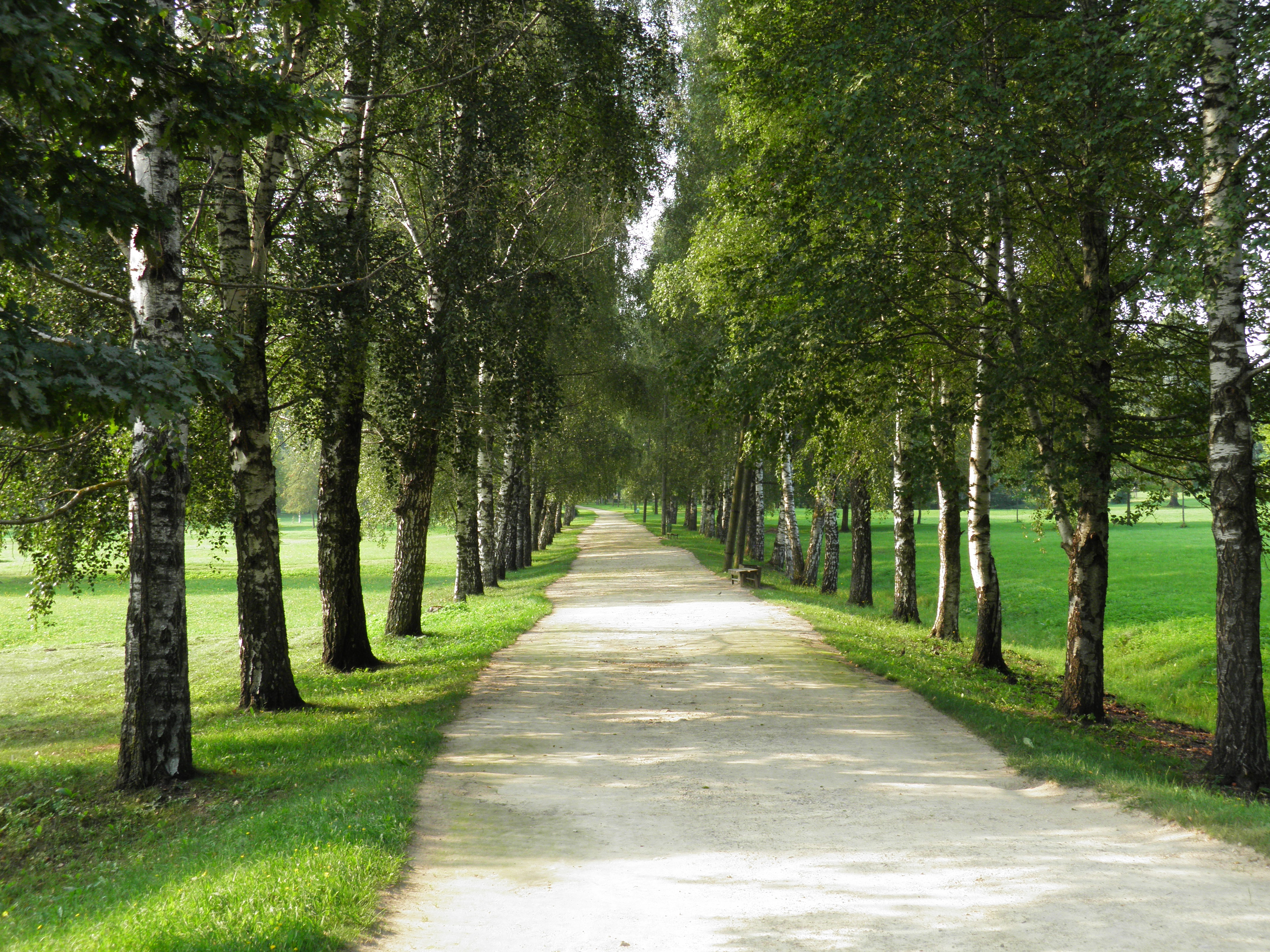

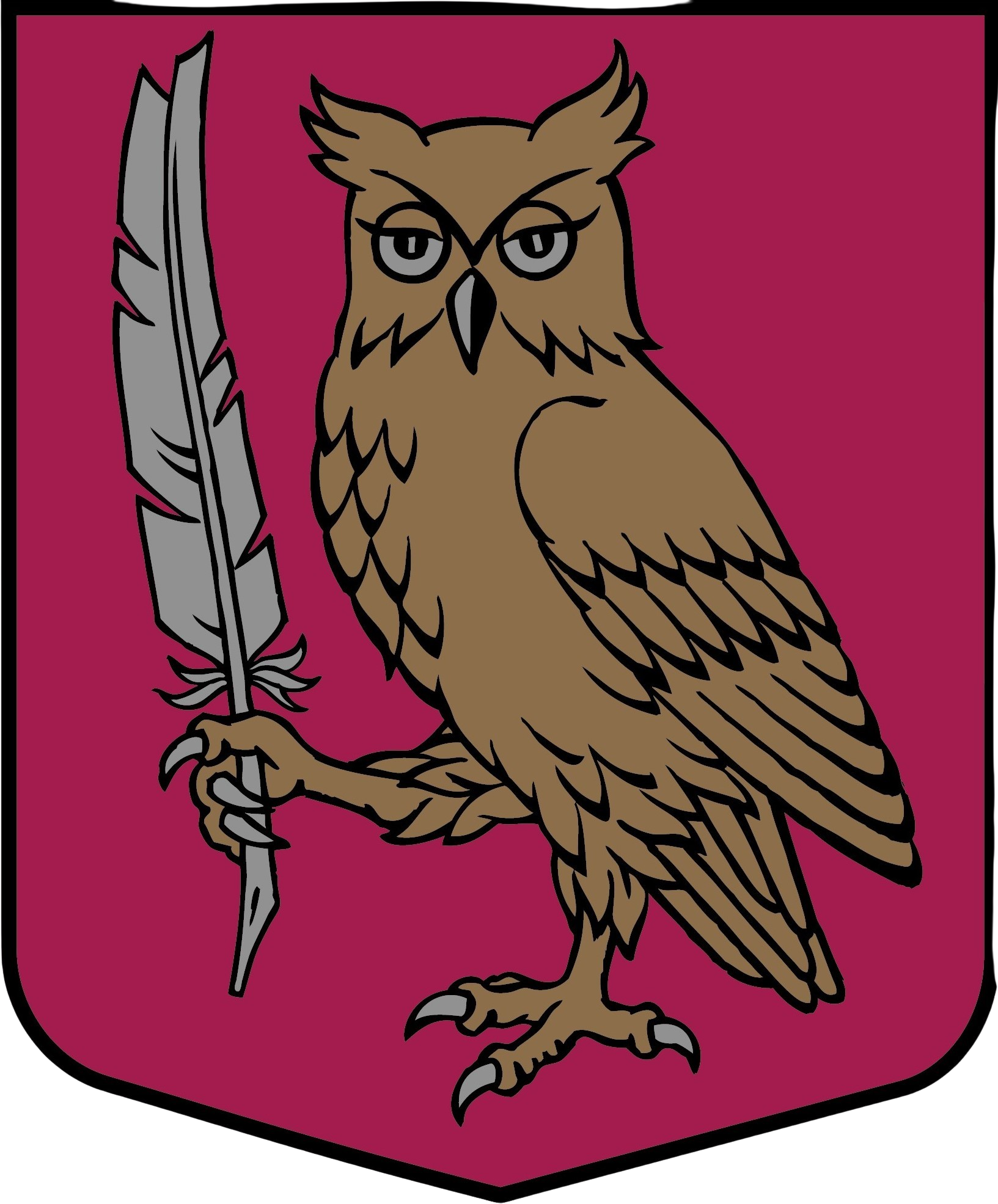
- Coat of arms

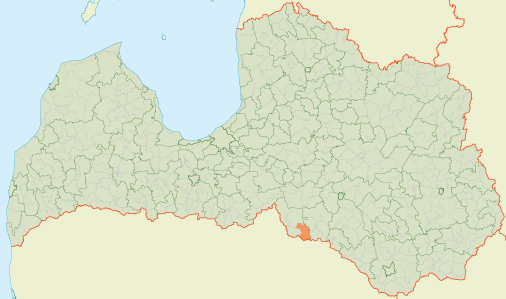
- 56°13′15″N 25°18′58″E

- Location within Latvia
- Country: Latvia

Area
  - Total: 125.69 km^{2} (48.53 sq mi)
  - Land: 121.35 km^{2} (46.85 sq mi)
  - Water: 4.34 km^{2} (1.68 sq mi)

Population (1 January 2026)
  - Total: 1,272
  - Density: 10.48/km^{2} (27.15/sq mi)

Nereta Parish (Latvian: Neretas pagasts) is an administrative unit of Aizkraukle Municipality in the Selonia region of Latvia. From 2009 to 2021 it was a part of Nereta Municipality.

== Towns, villages and settlements of Nereta Parish ==
- Nereta
- Neretaslauki
- Svajāni
