= Nereta =

Village in Latvia

- Village
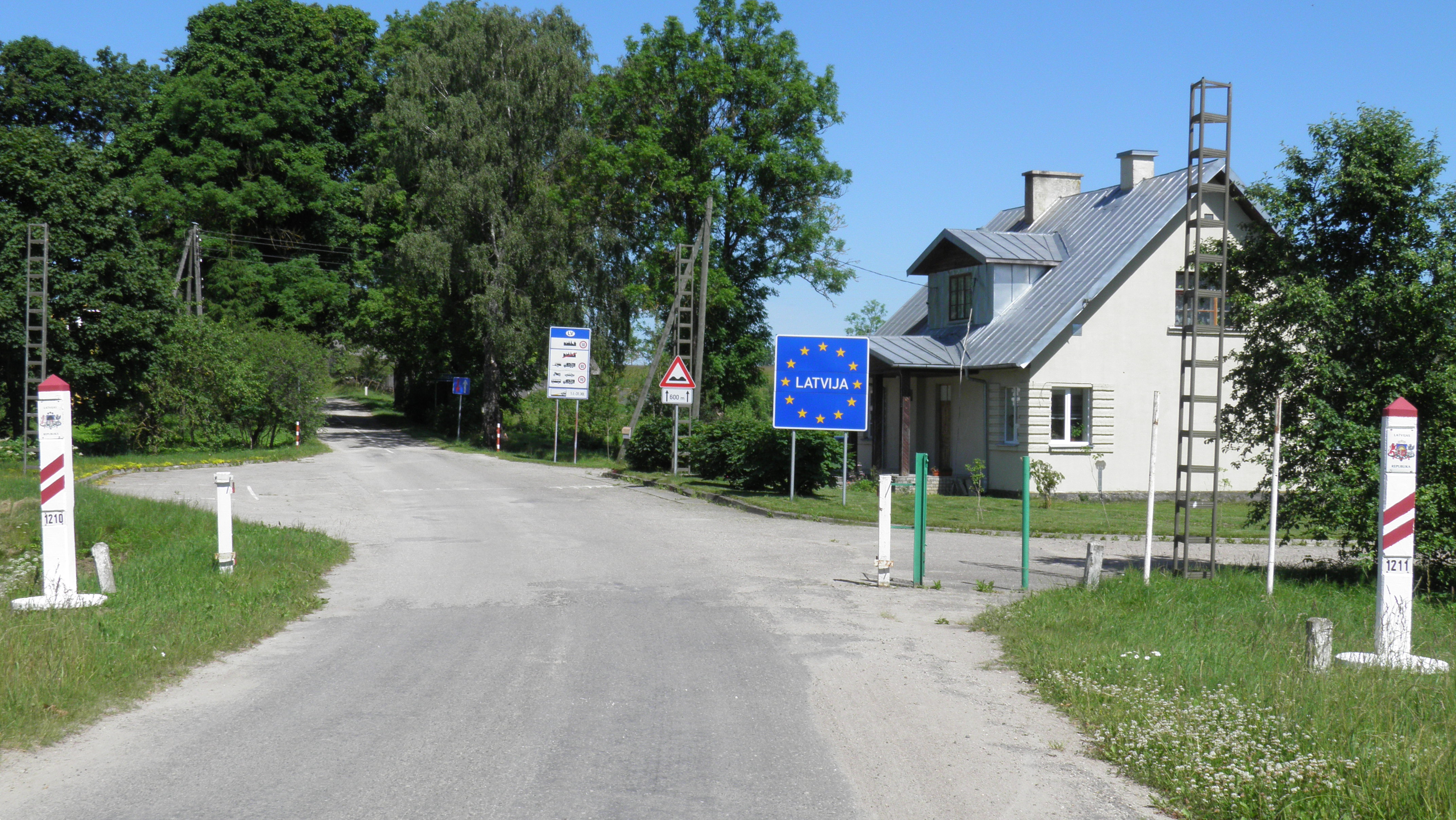
- The Latvian-Lithuanian border at Nereta

- Coat of arms

- Nereta's location in Latvia
- Coordinates: 56°12′16″N 25°18′28″E
- Country: Latvia
- Municipality: Aizkraukle
- Parish: Nereta
- First time mentioned: 1298

Population (2006)
  - Total: 1,282
- Postal code: LV-5118

Nereta (Lithuanian: Neretos; German: Nerft) is a village in Aizkraukle Municipality in the Selonia region of Latvia. The village is located 4 km from the border with Lithuania, on the Dienvidsusēja river (a right tributary of the Nemunėlis). Nereta has hosted the annual 3x3 Latvian heritage summer camp. Nereta had 1,282 residents as of 2006. Nereta the village is surrounded by numerous peat bogs.

== History ==
Nereta is located in the part of Selonia that was subjugated in the 13th century by the Livonian Order. Nereta was first mentioned in historical sources (as Nirica) in 1298. At the southern border of the Livonian Order Aizkraukle Command with the Grand Duchy of Lithuania lands, a fortified Nereta Manor, which belonged to the former Commander of the Order Wilhelm of Eferna after the collapse of the Order, von Effern. During times of Duchy of Courland and Semigallia, the ruined wooden building of the Nereta church was restored in 1570, but in 1584–1593. The current Nereta Lutheran Church stone building was built in 1564. In the year Nereta was called "Narite" by the river Dienvidsusēja. 1596. At the request of Duke Gotthard Kettler, the first Latin school for the children of servants of the manor and rectory was founded in Nereta. 1607. A nursery manor was awarded 300 years a year for the maintenance and hiring of a teacher.

Documents from 1672 mention Nereta town, which disappeared in 1709-1711 due to Great Northern War plague outbreak. Four years after the epidemic, only a few people lived in Nereta Manor (German: Hof zu Narten now Neretaslauki). In 1868 the parish house was built.

During World War I, German troops built a Viesīte narrow-gauge railway to supply the front, connecting Nereta with Jēkabpils and Suvainiškis in Lithuania. In 1927, Nereta was granted the status of densely populated (village), and from 1950 to 1990, Nereta had the status of workers' village (later an urban village). After that, it was the center of the parish Aizkraukle district, but after administrative-territorial reform in 2009 it became the center of Nereta Municipality.
