= Lūšna =

- Location within Lithuania
- Location: Rokiškis District Municipality, Lithuania
- Coordinates: 55°54′39″N 25°36′08″E
- Type: lake

Lūšna is a lake in Northwest Lithuania, Rokiškis District Municipality, about 5 kilometres (3.1 mi) south-east of Rokiškis. It is the origin of Nemunėlis River.
