= Biržai Forest =

Forest in Lithuania

Coordinates: 56°18′N 24°55′E

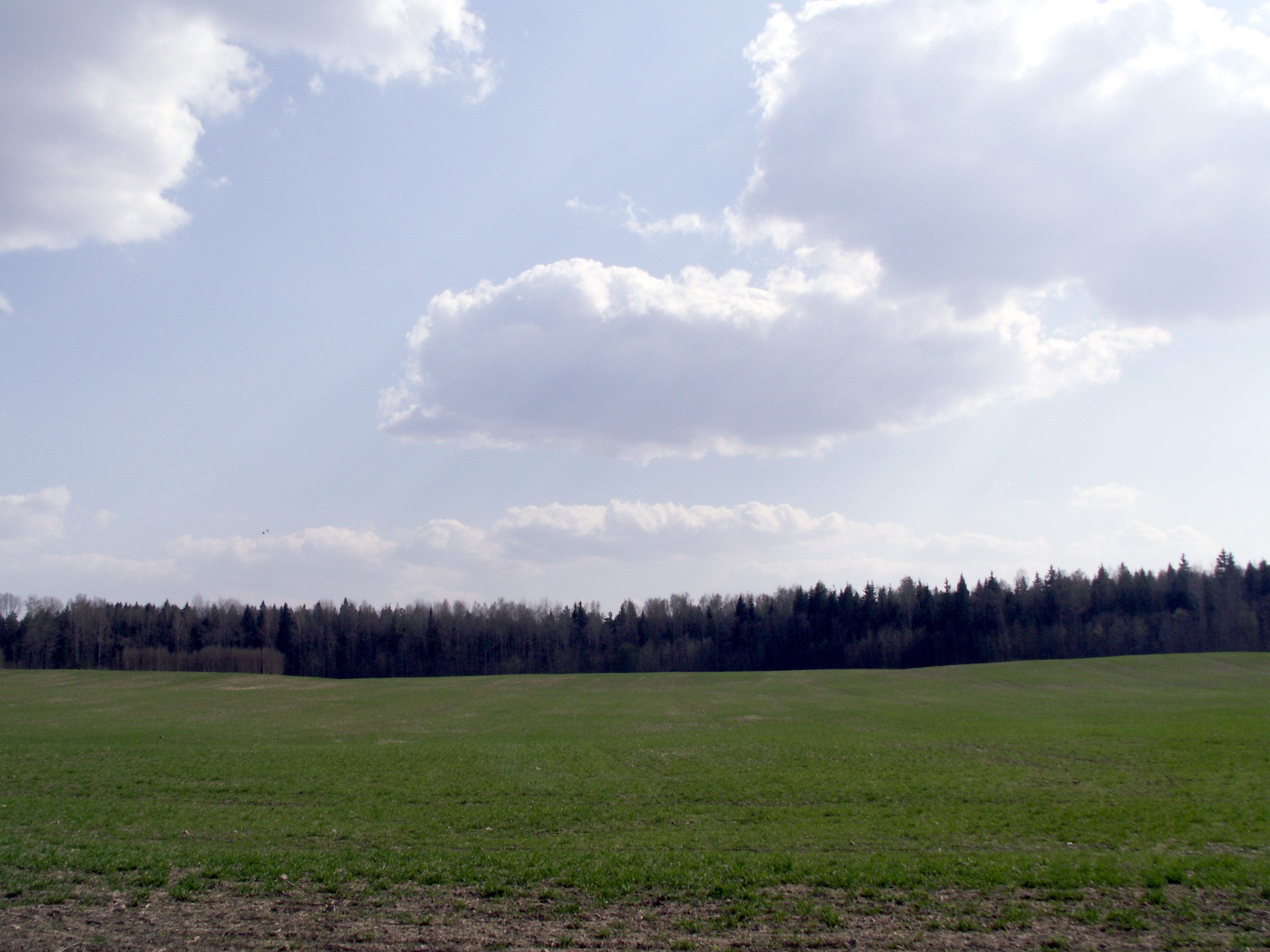
Biržai Forest near Tabokinė village

The Biržai Forest is an old-growth forest in Biržai District Municipality, Lithuania. The forest is recognised as a Key Biodiversity Area of international significance, with about 99.96% of its area under protection. It is managed, with some other smaller forests, by the Biržai Forestry Authority (Biržų miškų urėdija).

== Ecology ==
The Biržai Forest ecosystem consists predominantly of forest habitat (98 % of the total area), with a small portion (2%) classified as artificial terrestrial habitat.The forest lies at an elevation of roughly 60 to 70 metres above sea level and covers an area of about 170.5 square kilometres (17,050 ha).

The Biržai Botanical Reserve was established to preserve the characteristic plant communities of the Biržai forest, which is dominated by pine, oak, birch, and aspen species. The forest includes areas characterised as Fennoscandian hemiboreal natural old broad-leaved deciduous forests rich in epiphytes and Fennoscandian herb-rich forests with Picea abies, with an average stand age of about 123 years.

== Paleoenvironmental history ==
Scientific research has revealed that the Biržai region has a rich ecological history dating back tens of thousands of years. A 1992 study reported the discovery of 13-meter thick lacustrine sediments beneath a Late Valdaian moraine complex in a paleokarst depression near Biržai. Radiocarbon dating of wood fragments found in these sediments yielded dates of approximately 34,440 ± 1500 and 33,460 ± 1060 years BP (Before Present), placing them in the Middle Valdaian period.

Pollen analysis of these sediments indicated that during this period, the Biržai area supported taiga landscapes similar to those found today in the Pechora basin and eastern Ural Mountains. The dominant vegetation consisted of conifer forests with pine (Pinus), spruce (Picea), and larch (Larix), with some birch (Betula) and alder (Alnus) present during certain stages. The herbaceous layer included grasses (Poaceae), sedges (Cyperaceae), and various other plants including Artemisia and ferns. The research concluded that no ice sheet was present in the Baltic Region during this Middle Valdaian interval, confirming that the Biržai area has experienced significant ecological changes throughout the Quaternary period.

== Biodiversity ==
Biržai Forest hosts diverse beetle communities associated with dead wood. Research has shown that the forest's protected status and abundance of dead wood provide important habitats for saproxylic beetles (beetles dependent on dead and decaying wood). The Biržai Botanical Reserve was one of four protected areas in Lithuania studied for beetle diversity, with research confirming the importance of dead wood from different tree species in maintaining beetle diversity. The forest contains old-growth stands where natural processes, including windfall and natural tree decay, create ideal conditions for these specialised beetle communities.

== Conservation status ==
The Biržai Forest was formally assessed and confirmed as a Key Biodiversity Area in 2004. It is classified as a Regional KBA and was originally designated as an Important Bird and Biodiversity Area. The site's international significance is based on previously established criteria and thresholds for the identification of Important Bird and Biodiversity Areas, though available data indicate that it does not meet global KBA criteria and thresholds set out in the Global Standard.

== See also ==
- Biržai Regional Park
