= Pilskalne Parish, Aizkraukle Municipality =

Parish of Latvia

Coordinates: 56°12′2.13″N 25°15′59.38″E

Pilskalne Parish (Latvian: Pilskalnes pagasts) is an administrative unit of Aizkraukle Municipality in the Selonia region of Latvia. From 2009 until 2021, it was part of the former Nereta Municipality and before 2009 of the Aizkraukle district.

== Villages and settlements of Pilskalne Parish ==
- Gricgale
- Pilkalne
- Pilskalne

== Changes in population size ==
Within current borders, according to CSP data.

Changes in population size

Year	Pop.	±% p.a.
1935	1,168	—
1959	1,050	−0.44%
1967	1,025	−0.30%
1979	781	−2.24%

Year	Pop.	±% p.a.
1989	675	−1.45%
2000	689	+0.19%
2011	443	−3.94%
2021	331	−2.87%
