= Apaščia =

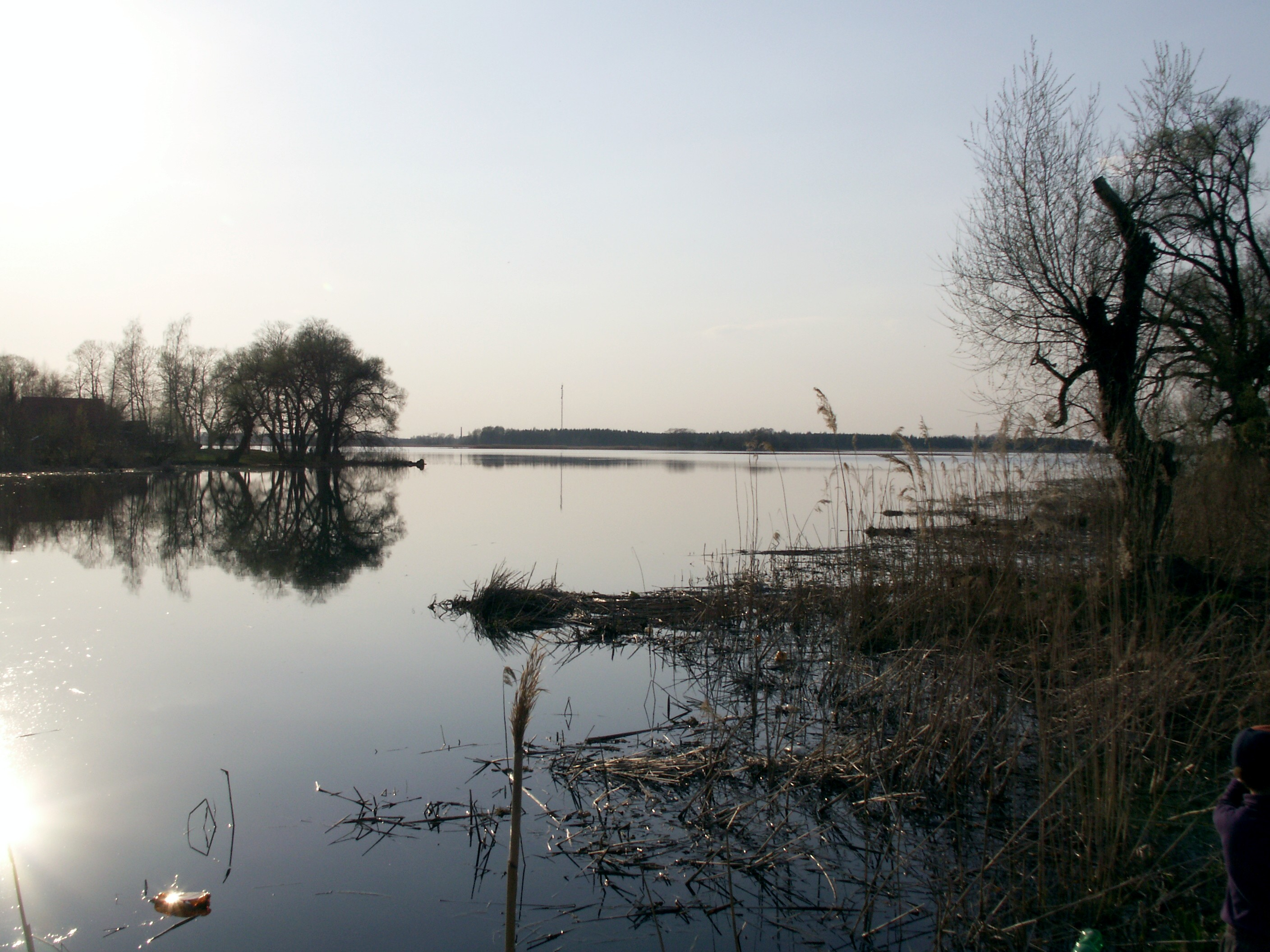

Location
- Country: Lithuania
- Location: Biržai district municipality, Panevėžys County

Physical characteristics
- Mouth: Nemunėlis
  - coordinates: 56°24′2″N 24°46′9″E

Basin features
- Progression: Nemunėlis→ Lielupe→ Baltic Sea
- Tributaries
  - right: Rovėja, Aukštoji Gervė, Žemoji Gervė

The Apaščia is a river of Biržai district municipality, Panevėžys County, northern Lithuania. It flows for 88 kilometres and has a basin area of 893 km².

It is a left tributary of the Nemunėlis.
