= Nereta Municipality =

Municipality of Latvia

Coordinates: 56°12′16″N 25°18′28″E

Nereta Municipality Neretas novads
- Municipality
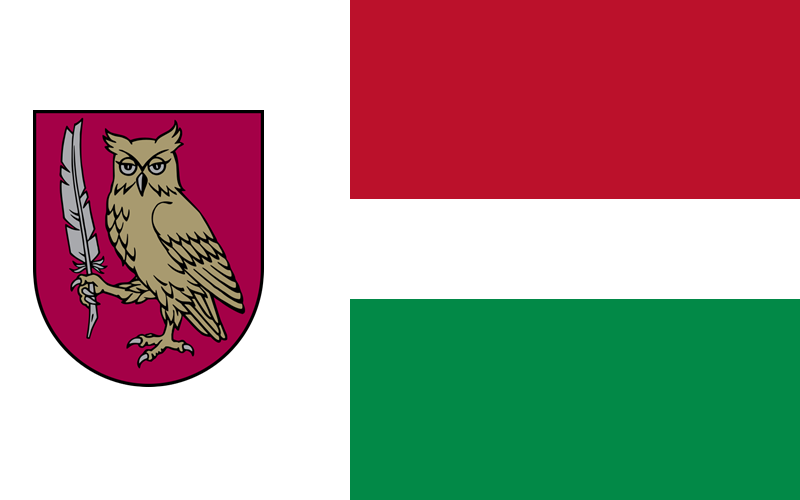
- Flag Coat of arms

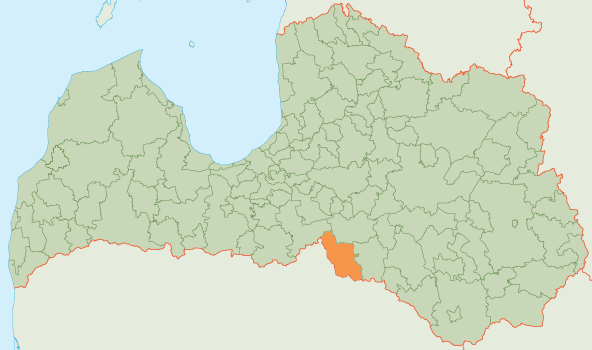
- Country: Latvia
- Formed: 2009
- Centre: Nereta

Government
  - Council Chair: Arvīds Kviesis (V)

Area
  - Total: 645.12 km^{2} (249.08 sq mi)
  - Land: 632.90 km^{2} (244.36 sq mi)
  - Water: 12.22 km^{2} (4.72 sq mi)

Population (2021)
  - Total: 3,278
  - Density: 5.179/km^{2} (13.41/sq mi)
- Website: www.neretasnovads.lv

Nereta Municipality (Latvian: Neretas novads) is a former municipality in Selonia, Latvia. The municipality was formed in 2009 by merging Mazzalve Parish, Nereta Parish, Pilskalne Parish and Zalve Parish, with the administrative center being Nereta. As of 2020, the population was 3,284.

On 1 July 2021, Nereta Municipality ceased to exist and its territory was merged into Aizkraukle Municipality.

== See also ==
- Administrative divisions of Latvia (2009)
