= Dienvidsusēja =

River in Latvia

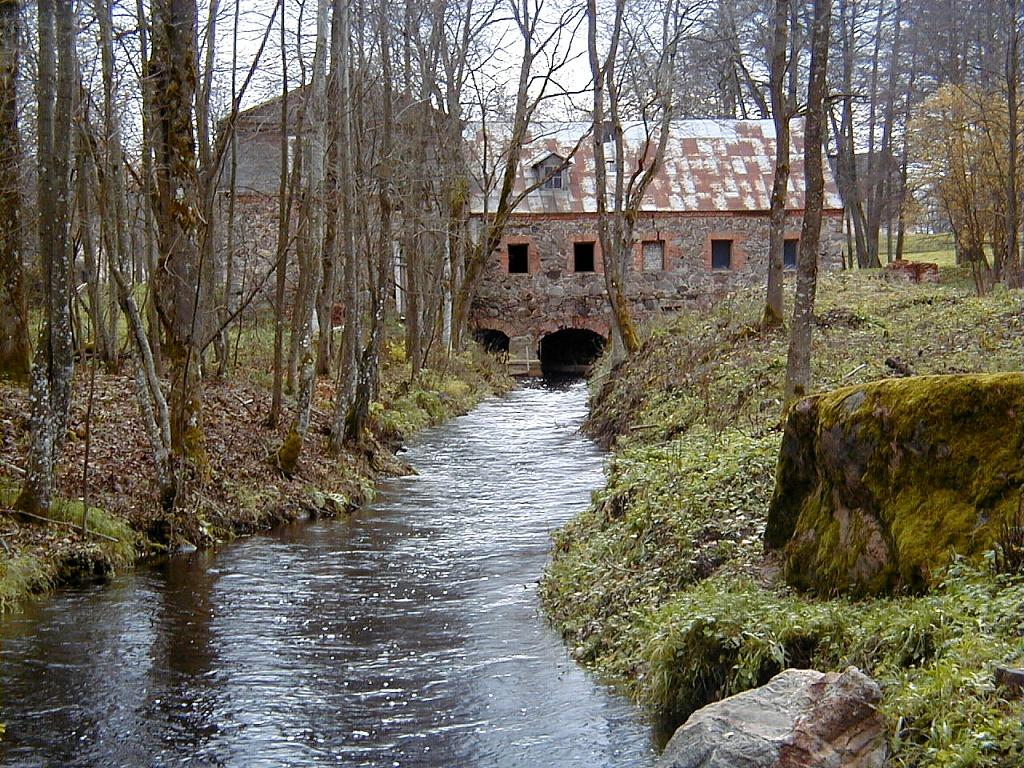
- Dienvidsusēja near Gārsene

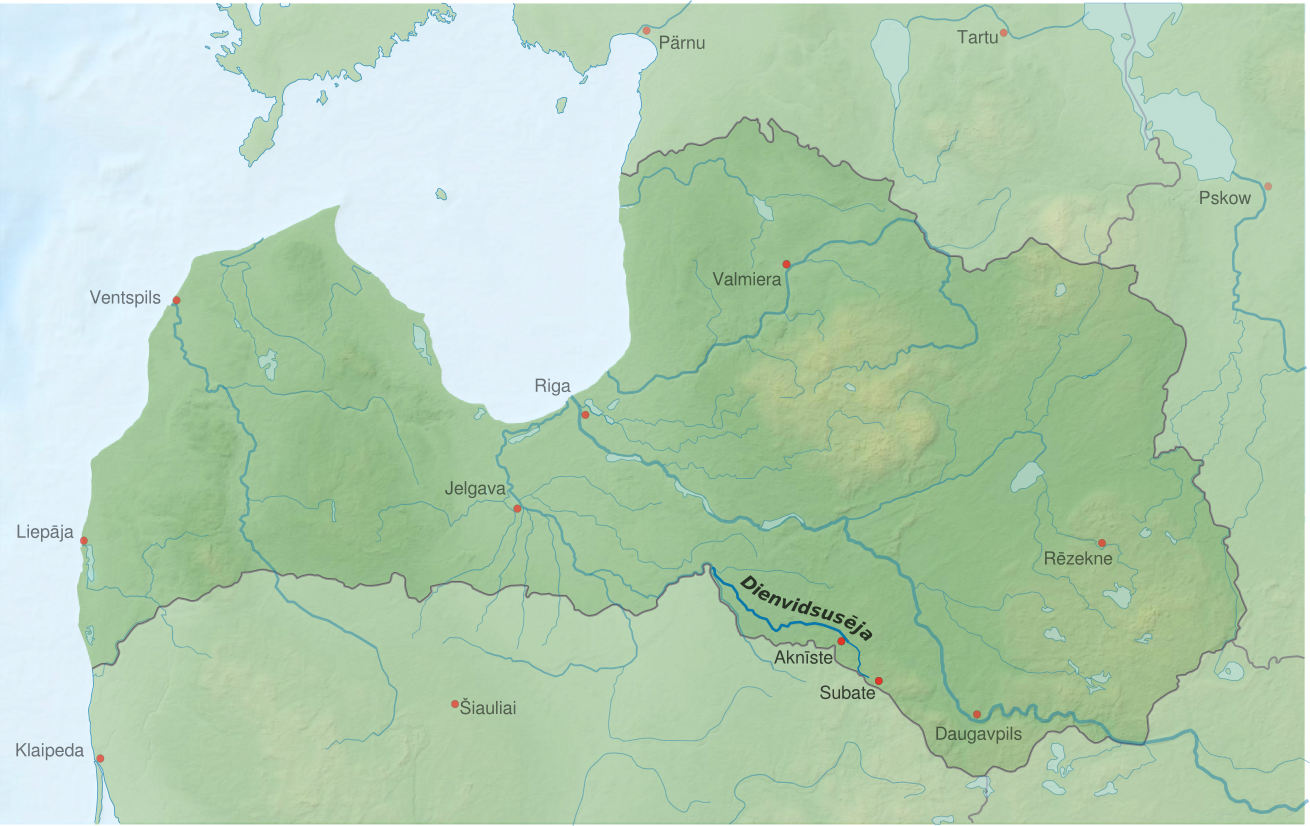

Location
- Country: Latvia, Lithuania

Physical characteristics
- Source
  - location: near Subate, Augšdaugava Municipality
  - elevation: 81 m (266 ft)
- Mouth: Nemunėlis (Mēmele)
  - location: Sandariškai
  - coordinates: 56.4030°N 24.9241°E
- Length: 114 km (71 mi)
- Basin size: 1,220.9 km^{2} (471.4 sq mi) (1,192.5 km^{2} (460.4 sq mi) within Latvia)
- Discharge
  - average: 246 L/s (8.7 cu ft/s)

Basin features
- Progression: Nemunėlis→ Lielupe→ Baltic Sea
- Tributaries
  - right: Zalvīte

The Dienvidsusēja (also known as Susēja or Suseja; Lithuanian: Susėja) is a river of Latvia and a right tributary of the river Mēmele. It flows for 114 kilometres. For 4.2 km, the river forms the border between Latvia and Lithuania. The river flows through Aknīste town, Nereta village and several smaller settlements.

== Tributaries ==
- Zalvīte (36 km),
- Radžupe (21 km),
- Arālīte (21 km).

== See also ==
- List of rivers of Latvia
