= Mazzalve Parish =

Parish of Latvia

- parish of Latvia
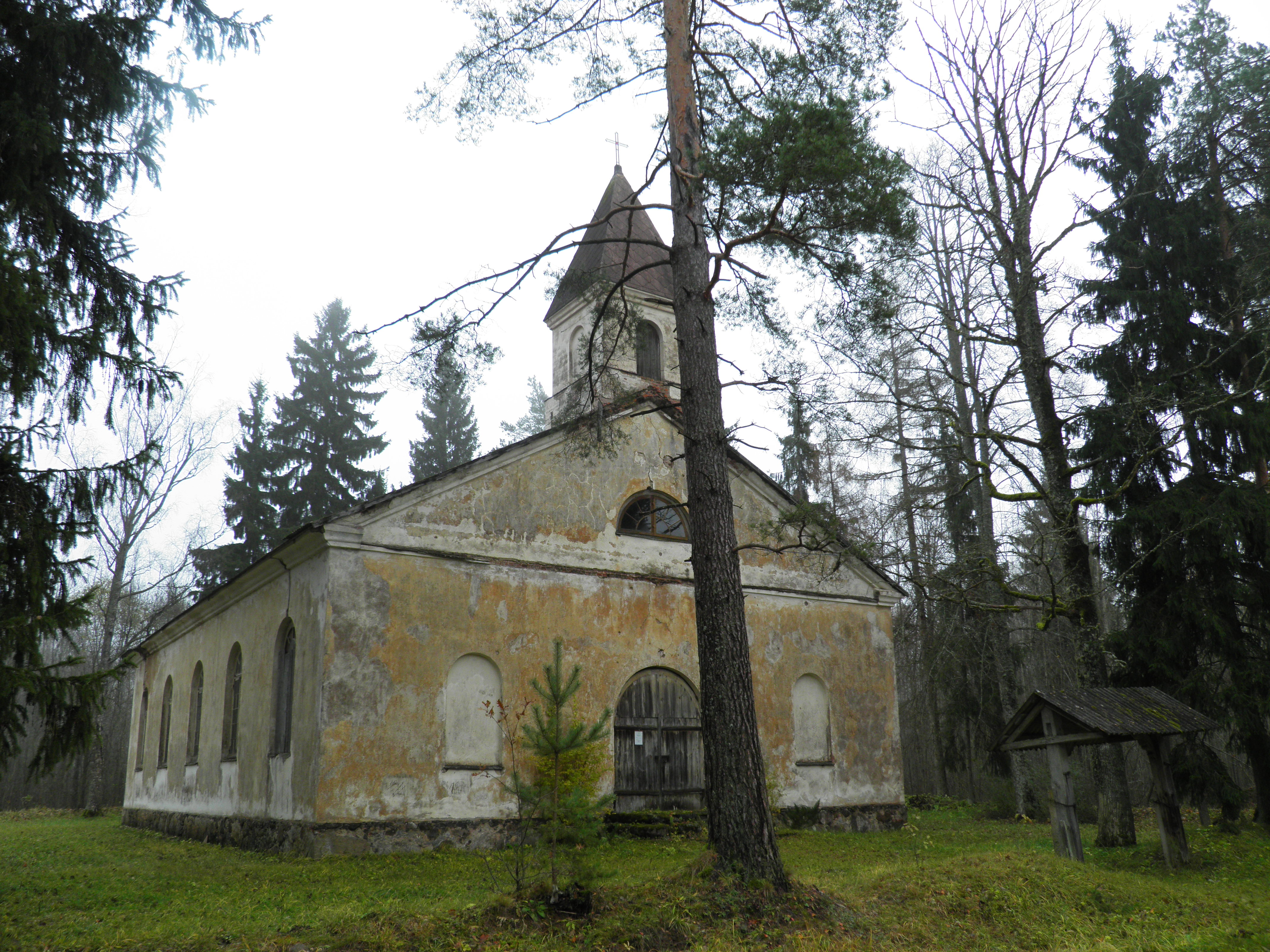

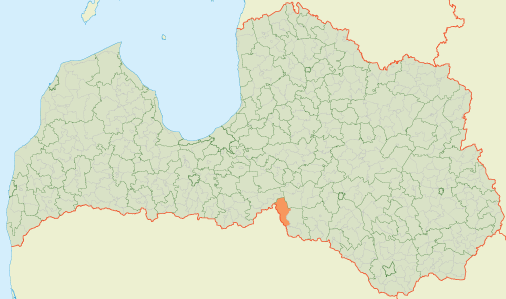
- 56°23′37″N 25°00′53″E

- Location within Latvia
- Country: Latvia

Area
  - Total: 209.38 km^{2} (80.84 sq mi)
  - Land: 201.86 km^{2} (77.94 sq mi)
  - Water: 7.52 km^{2} (2.90 sq mi)

Population (1 January 2026)
  - Total: 861
  - Density: 4.27/km^{2} (11.0/sq mi)

Mazzalve Parish (Latvian: Mazzalves pagasts) is an administrative unit of Aizkraukle Municipality in the Selonia region of Latvia.

== Towns, villages and settlements of Mazzalve Parish ==
- Ērberģe
- Lielmēmele
