= Nemunėlis =

River in Lithuania and Latvia

Nemunėlis, Mēmele
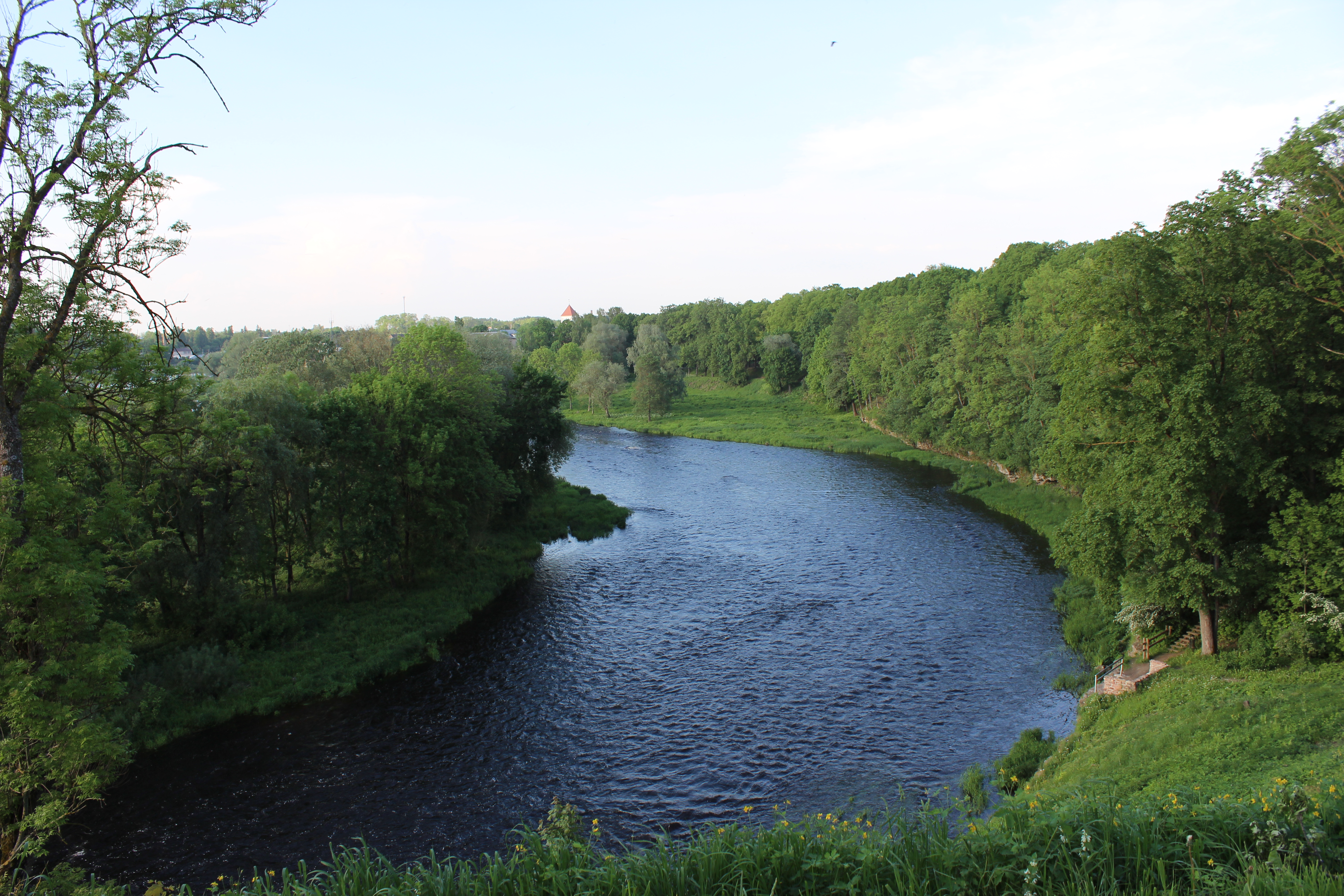
- The Mēmele in Bauska city

Location
- Country: Lithuania and Latvia

Physical characteristics
- Source
  - location: Lūšna lake in Rokiškis district
  - elevation: 73 m (240 ft)
- Mouth: Lielupe
  - location: Bauska
  - coordinates: 56°24′09″N 24°09′25″E
- Length: 191 km (119 mi)
- Basin size: 4,048 km^{2} (1,563 sq mi)
- Discharge
  - average: 95 m^{3}/s (3,400 cu ft/s)

Basin features
- Progression: Lielupe→ Baltic Sea
- Tributaries
  - left: Bėnupė, Apaščia
  - right: Nereta, Dienvidsusēja, Viesīte

Nemunėlis (Latvian: Mēmele) is a river in northern Lithuania and southern Latvia. It originates 6 km south of Rokiškis. It is 191 kilometres long (75 km in Lithuania, 76 km on the Latvia–Lithuania border and 40 km in Latvia) before its confluence with the Mūša, near Bauska, forming the Lielupe.

== Names ==
This river does not belong to the basin of the larger river Neman, but the two rivers' names are related in several languages:

- in Lithuanian, "Nemunėlis" is a diminutive form of "Nemunas" (Neman)
- in German, "Memel" is used for both the Neman River and the city of Klaipėda, and "Memele" is its diminutive form
- in Latvian, the river is called "Mēmele", possibly derived from German, or directly from Old Prussian in which it is thought to mean "surrounded by water"
- in Estonian, it is called "Memele jõgi"

== Tourist development ==
The European Union gave 100,000 euros to establish tourist routes along the Nemunėlis. It is expected that the Latvian and Lithuanian initiative will be completed in 2007, as new kayak and boat rental businesses open and new campsites, tourist guides, and information signs are prepared.
